= Genova Sampierdarena railway station =

Railway station in Genoa, Italy

Genova Sampierdarena
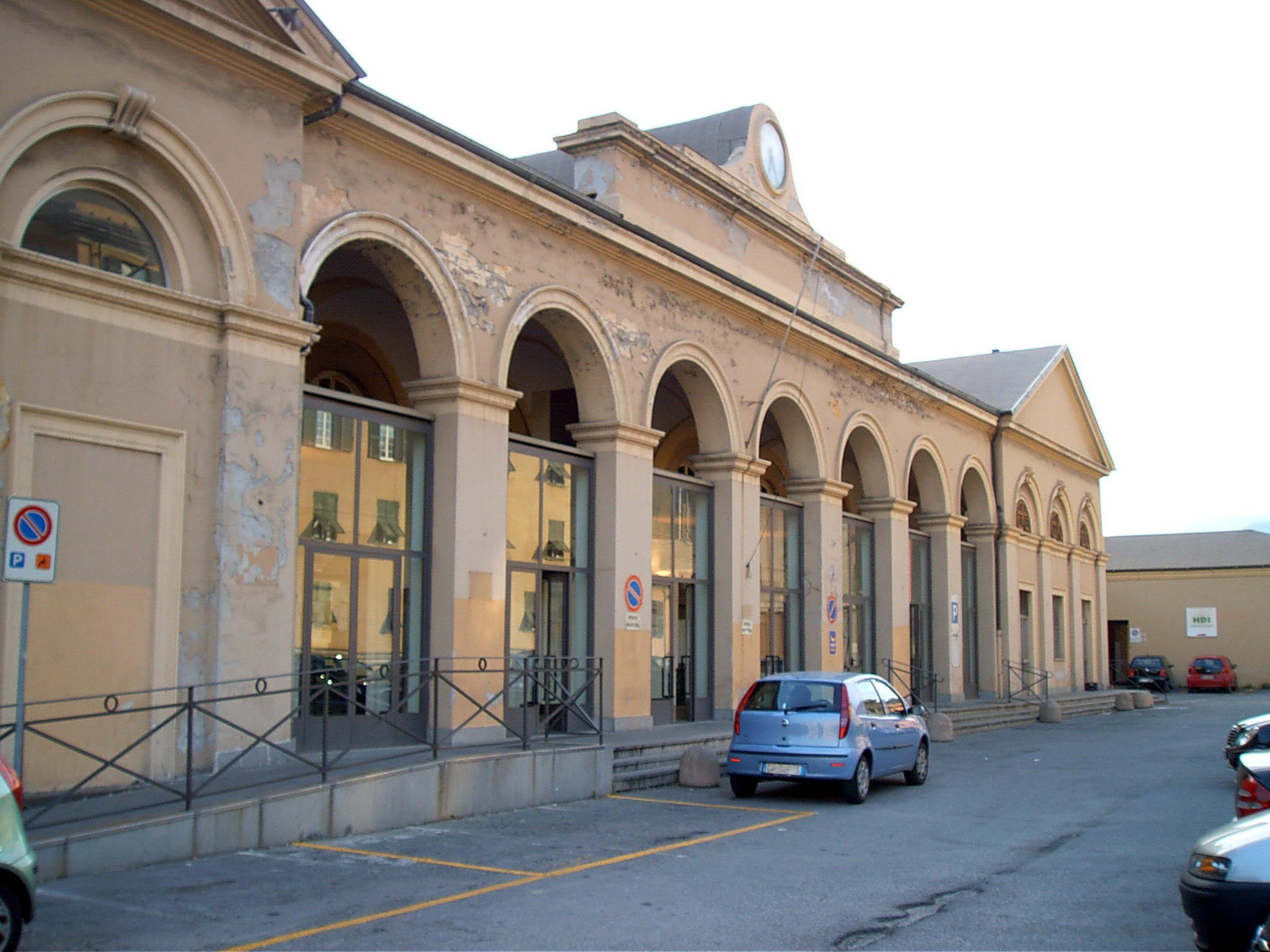
- The station entrance facing Piazza Montano.

General information
- Location: Piazza Montano; 16151 Genova; Genoa, Genoa, Liguria; Italy
- Coordinates: 44°24′47″N 08°53′15″E
- Owner: Rete Ferroviaria Italiana
- Operator: Centostazioni
- Lines: Turin-Genoa; Genoa-Ventimiglia (-France); Asti-Genoa
- Platforms: 6
- Train operators: Trenitalia
- Connections: Urban and suburban buses

History
- Opened: 1853
Location
- Location within Liguria Location within Northern Italy Location within Italy

Genova Sampierdarena railway station (Italian: Stazione di Genova Sampierdarena) is located in Piazza Montano, in the Sampierdarena district of Genoa, Italy. It is Genoa's third most important railway station, after Genova Piazza Principe and Genova Brignole.

The station is owned by Rete Ferroviaria Italiana (RFI), a subsidiary of the Ferrovie dello Stato (FS) group. The commercial area of the station building is managed by Centostazioni. RFI internally classifies the facility in its gold category.

About 7,000,000 passengers use the station each year.

== History ==
The original nucleus of the station was built in 1853 at the completion of Genoa-Busalla section of the Turin–Genoa railway.

The station was then enlarged with the construction of the Genoa–Ventimiglia railway and the Asti–Genoa railway, for which it is also a junction station.

== Features ==
Genova Sampierdarena has six tracks for passenger traffic. The first four, located on the north side of the station, are for the three lines passing through the station, while tracks 5 and 6, parallel to the coast, serve the line to Ventimiglia via Savona.

Alongside tracks 5 and 6 are two entrances that connect directly with the new Fiumara park area. The other entrances are in Piazza Nicolò Montano (interchange with numerous bus lines), Via Paolo Reti and Via Stefano Dondero.

The station is used mainly for metropolitan, regional and interregional traffic.

In the near future, work will begin on renovations involving most of the station. Initially, two new terminating tracks will be created to accommodate trains on the line from Giovi, and the underpass will be restructured with the addition of elevators and the likely construction of a new underpass. The platforms will then be rebuilt and fitted with wind barriers.

== Interchange ==
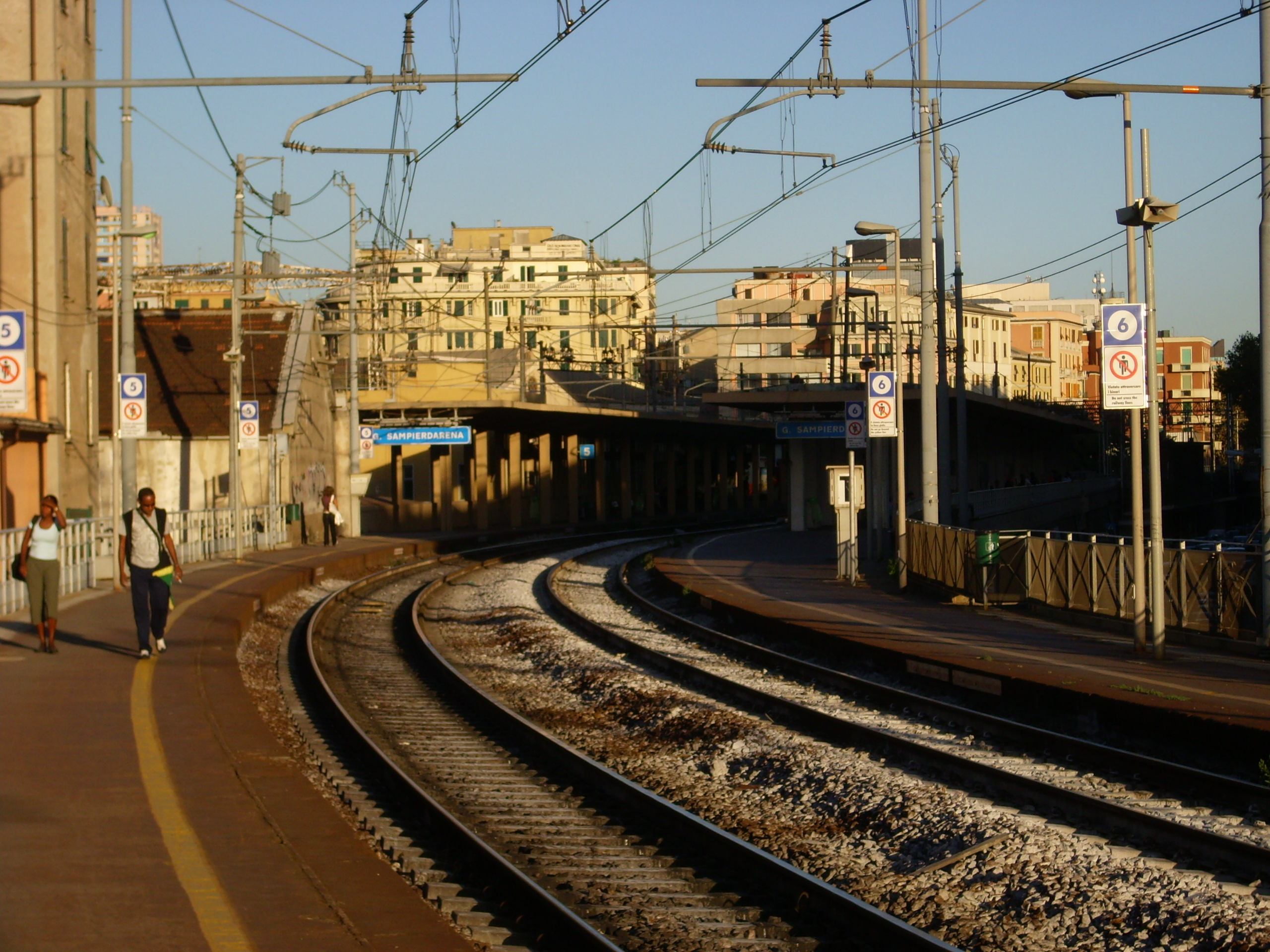
Tracks 5 and 6, photographed from the footpath to the Fiumara area.

Near the station are the termini of several lines of the local suburban public transport network, AMT (Genoa). These join together to head into the city centre: lines 18 and 18/ (direct to Ospedale San Martino), and 20 (trolley-bus line towards the neighborhood of Foce, where the last stop is a few hundred meters (or yards) from Fiera di Genova).

Additionally, there are the coach lines 62 (direct to the Coronata area, in the district of Cornigliano), 63 (from the station to the Gallino hospital in Pontedecimo), 66 (which has its other terminus in the Dinegro area, not far from the homonymous Metro station) and 165 (a circular line that connects the station with the Villa Scassi hospital, passing through the central Via Cantore). In the Via Paolo Rieti area, a few tens of meters (or yards) from the station, there is an AMT terminus served by buses showing Sampierdarena Rimessa on their destination boards.

For the bus lines passing through and around the station, there are several bus stops in each direction served by buses connecting the city centre with the western districts, and Val Polcevera (lines 1, 2, 3, 7, 8, 9 respectively, the latter operating only in the very early morning and evening).

Within walking distance of the station are the stops served by the Volabus, the AMT fast bus link between the Genova Piazza Principe railway station and Genoa Cristoforo Colombo Airport.

== Train services ==
The station is served by the following service(s):

== Sampierdarena Smistamento ==
The nearby Sampierdarena Smistamento yard is Genoa's main freight marshalling yard.

Directly connected with the cargo port and the Genova Marittima Bacino railway station by a submarine tunnel, Sampierdarena Smistamento is composed of three separate yards:

- Forni;
- Polcevera;
- Piazza d'armi (now abandoned).

Sampierdarena Smistamento is also used as an exit for the Cargo Division locomotive depot located just to the north, in the district of Rivarolo.

== See also ==
- Railway stations in Genoa
- List of railway stations in Liguria
- Railway stations in Italy
