= List of railway stations in Liguria =

This is the list of the railway stations in Liguria owned by:

- Rete Ferroviaria Italiana (RFI), a branch of the Italian state company Ferrovie dello Stato;
- Azienda Mobilità e Trasporti (AMT).

== RFI stations ==
Station	Locality	Province	Category
Airole	Airole	Imperia	Bronze
Alassio	Alassio	Savona	Silver
Albenga	Albenga	Savona	Silver
Albisola	Albisola Superiore	Savona	Silver
Altare	Altare	Savona	Bronze
Andora	Andora	Savona	Silver
Arcola	Arcola	La Spezia	Bronze
Arenzano	Arenzano	Genoa (Genova)	Silver
Bevera	Bevera	Imperia	Bronze
Bogliasco	Bogliasco	Genoa (Genova)	Silver
Bonassola	Bonassola	La Spezia	Silver
Bordighera	Bordighera	Imperia	Silver
Borghetto Santo Spirito	Borghetto Santo Spirito	Savona	Bronze
Borgio Verezzi	Borgio Verezzi	Savona	Bronze
Borgo Fornari per Voltaggio	Borgo Fornari	Genoa (Genova)	Silver
Bragno	Cairo Montenotte	Savona	Bronze
Busalla	Busalla	Genoa (Genova)	Silver
Ca' di Boschetti	La Spezia	Liguria	Bronze
Cairo Montenotte	Cairo Montenotte	Savona	Bronze
Camogli-San Fruttuoso	Camogli	Genoa (Genova)	Silver
Campo Ligure-Masone	Campo Ligure	Genoa (Genova)	Silver
Cavi	Cavi	Genoa (Genova)	Bronze
Celle Ligure	Celle Ligure	Savona	Silver
Cengio	Cengio	Savona	Bronze
Ceriale	Ceriale	Savona	Bronze
Cervo-San Bartolomeo	Cervo	Imperia	Bronze
Chiavari	Chiavari	Genoa (Genova)	Silver
Cogoleto	Cogoleto	Genoa (Genova)	Silver
Corniglia	Corniglia	La Spezia	Silver
Dego	Dego	Savona	Bronze
Deiva Marina	Deiva Marina	La Spezia	Silver
Diano	Diano San Pietro	Imperia	Silver
Ferrania	Cairo Montenotte	Savona	Bronze
Finale Ligure Marina	Finale Ligure	Savona	Silver
Framura	Framura	La Spezia	Silver
Genova Acquasanta	Genova	Genoa (Genova)	Bronze
Genova Bolzaneto	Genova	Genoa (Genova)	Silver
Genova Borzoli	Genova	Genoa (Genova)	Bronze
Genova Brignole	Genova	Genoa (Genova)	Gold
Genova Cornigliano	Genova	Genoa (Genova)	Silver
Genova Costa	Genova	Genoa (Genova)	Bronze
Genova Granara	Genova	Genoa (Genova)	Bronze
Genova Nervi	Genova	Genoa (Genova)	Silver
Genova Pegli	Genova	Genoa (Genova)	Silver
Genova Piazza Principe	Genova	Genoa (Genova)	Platinum
Genova Pontedecimo	Genova	Genoa (Genova)	Silver
Genova Pra	Genova	Genoa (Genova)	Silver
Genova Quarto dei Mille	Genova	Genoa (Genova)	Silver
Genova Quinto al Mare	Genova	Genoa (Genova)	Silver
Genova Rivarolo	Genova	Genoa (Genova)	Silver
Genova Sampierdarena	Genova	Genoa (Genova)	Gold
Genova San Biagio	Genova	Genoa (Genova)	Bronze
Genova Sestri Ponente	Genova	Genoa (Genova)	Silver
Genova Sturla	Genova	Genoa (Genova)	Silver
Genova Vesima	Genova	Genoa (Genova)	Bronze
Genova Via di Francia	Genova	Genoa (Genova)	Bronze
Genova Voltri	Genova	Genoa (Genova)	Silver
Imperia Oneglia	Imperia	Imperia	Silver
Imperia Porto Maurizio	Imperia	Imperia	Silver
Isola del Cantone	Isola del Cantone	Genoa (Genova)	Bronze
La Spezia Centrale	La Spezia	La Spezia	Gold
La Spezia Migliarina	La Spezia	La Spezia	Silver
Laigueglia	Laigueglia	Savona	Bronze
Lavagna	Lavagna	Genoa (Genova)	Silver
Levanto	Levanto	La Spezia	Silver
Loano	Loano	Savona	Silver
Luni	Luni	La Spezia	Bronze
Manarola	Manarola	La Spezia	Silver
Mele	Mele	Genoa (Genova)	Bronze
Mignanego	Mignanego	Genoa (Genova)	Bronze
Moneglia	Moneglia	Genoa (Genova)	Silver
Monterosso	Monterosso al Mare	La Spezia	Silver
Mulinetti	Mulinetti	Genoa (Genova)	Bronze
Olivetta-S.Michele	Olivetta	Imperia	Bronze
Piana	Piana Crixia	Savona	Bronze
Piano Orizzontale dei Giovi	Serra Riccò	Genoa (Genova)	Silver
Pietra Ligure	Pietra Ligure	Savona	Silver
Pietrabissara	Pietrabissara	Genoa (Genova)	Bronze
Pieve Ligure	Pieve Ligure	Genoa (Genova)	Bronze
Pontetto	Pontetto	Genoa (Genova)	Bronze
Quiliano-Vado Ligure	Vado Ligure	Savona	Bronze
Rapallo	Rapallo	Genoa (Genova)	Gold
Recco	Recco	Genoa (Genova)	Silver
Riomaggiore	Riomaggiore	La Spezia	Silver
Riva Trigoso	Riva Trigoso	Genoa (Genova)	Bronze
Rocchetta Cairo	Cairo Montenotte	Savona	Bronze
Ronco Scrivia	Ronco Scrivia	Genoa (Genova)	Silver
Rossiglione	Rossiglione	Genoa (Genova)	Silver
San Giuseppe di Cairo	Cairo Montenotte	Savona	Silver
Santa Margherita Ligure-Portofino	Santa Margherita Ligure	Genoa (Genova)	Silver
Santo Stefano di Magra	Santo Stefano di Magra	La Spezia	Silver
Sanremo	Sanremo	Imperia	Silver
Santuario	Savona	Savona	Bronze
Sarzana	Sarzana	La Spezia	Silver
Savona	Savona	Savona	Gold
Sestri Levante	Sestri Levante	Genoa (Genova)	Silver
Sori	Sori	Genoa (Genova)	Silver
Spotorno-Noli	Spotorno	Savona	Silver
Taggia-Arma	Taggia	Imperia	Silver
Vallecrosia	Vallecrosia	Imperia	Bronze
Varazze	Varazze	Savona	Silver
Ventimiglia	Ventimiglia	Imperia	Gold
Vernazza	Vernazza	La Spezia	Silver
Vezzano Ligure	Vezzano Ligure	La Spezia	Silver
Zoagli	Zoagli	Genoa (Genova)	Bronze

== AMT stations ==
Station	Locality	Province
Bari	Genoa	Genoa (Genova)
Busalletta	Sant'Olcese	Genoa (Genova)
Cambiaso	Genoa	Genoa (Genova)
Campi	Sant'Olcese	Genoa (Genova)
Canova Crocetta	Casella	Genoa (Genova)
Cappuccio	Genoa	Genoa (Genova)
Casella Deposito	Casella	Genoa (Genova)
Casella Paese	Casella	Genoa (Genova)
Centurione	Genoa	Genoa (Genova)
Chiassaiuola	Genoa	Genoa (Genova)
Genova Piazza Manin	Genoa	Genoa (Genova)
Granarolo	Genoa	Genoa (Genova)
Molinetti	Sant'Olcese	Genoa (Genova)
Niusci	Serra Riccò	Genoa (Genova)
Pino	Sant'Olcese	Genoa (Genova)
Principe	Genoa	Genoa (Genova)
Salita Granarolo	Genoa	Genoa (Genova)
Salita San Rocco	Genoa	Genoa (Genova)
San Pantaleo	Genoa	Genoa (Genova)
Sant'Antonino	Genoa	Genoa (Genova)
Sant'Olcese Chiesa	Sant'Olcese	Genoa (Genova)
Sant'Olcese Tullo	Sant'Olcese	Genoa (Genova)
Sardorella	Sant'Olcese	Genoa (Genova)
Torrazza	Sant'Olcese	Genoa (Genova)
Trensasco	Sant'Olcese	Genoa (Genova)
Vallombrosa	Sant'Olcese	Genoa (Genova)
Via Bianco	Genoa	Genoa (Genova)
Vicomorasso	Sant'Olcese	Genoa (Genova)

== See also ==
- Railway stations in Italy
- Ferrovie dello Stato
- Rail transport in Italy
- High-speed rail in Italy
- Transport in Italy
