= Cervo–San Bartolomeo railway station =

Railway station in Italy

Cervo–S.Bartolomeo
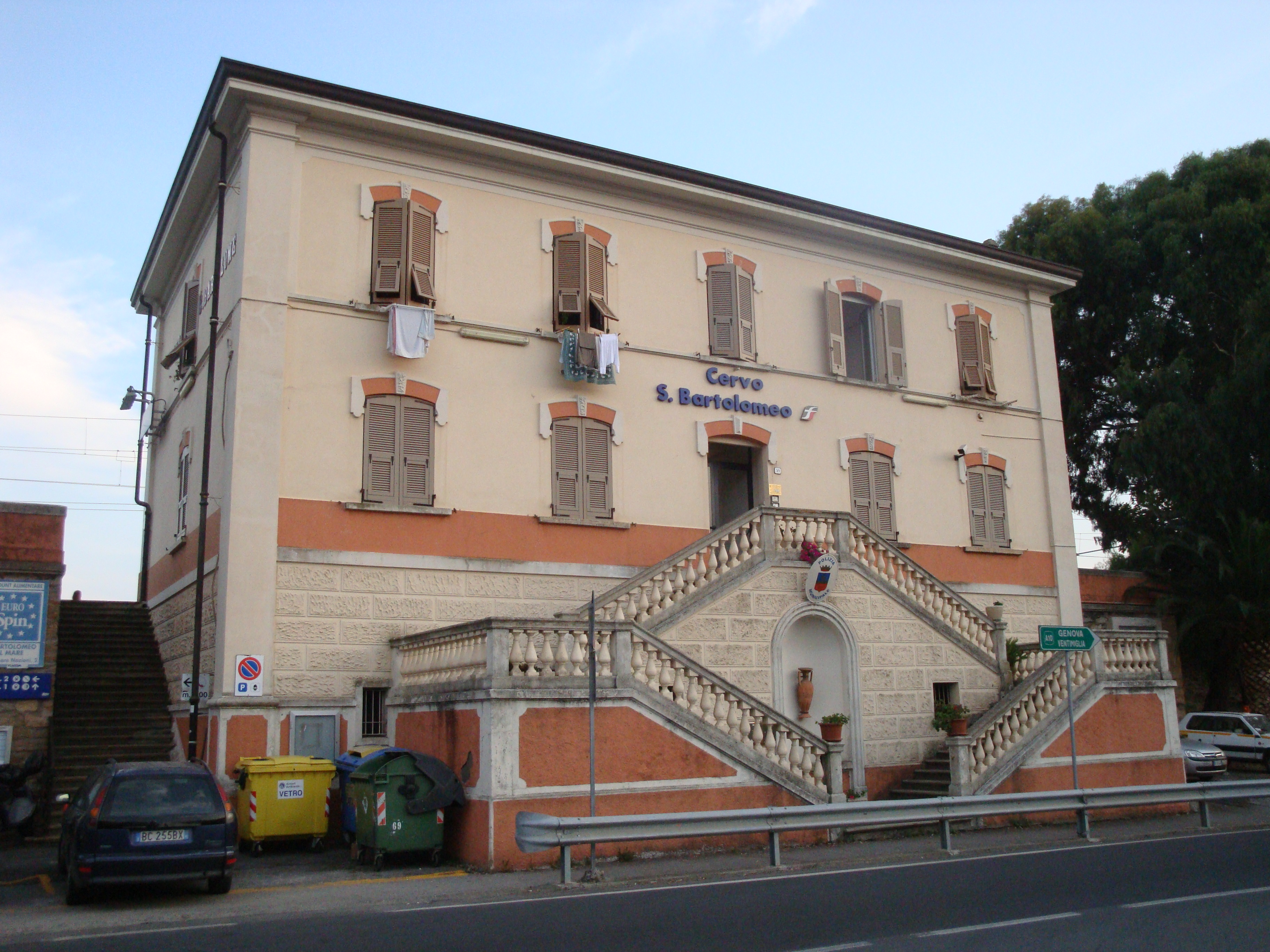
- Cervo-San Bartolomeo railway station.

General information
- Location: Via Aurelia 59; 18010 Cervo; Cervo, Imperia, Liguria; Italy
- Coordinates: 43°55′27″N 08°06′34″E
- Operator: Rete Ferroviaria Italiana
- Line: Genoa–Ventimiglia railway
- Distance: 98.673 km (61.313 mi) from Genova Piazza Principe
- Platforms: 2
- Tracks: 2
- Train operators: Trenitalia

History
- Opened: 1872; 154 years ago
- Closed: December 11, 2016; 9 years ago
Location
- Location within Liguria Location within Northern Italy Location within Italy

Cervo–San Bartolomeo railway station (Italian: Stazione di Cervo–San Bartolomeo) served the towns of Cervo and San Bartolomeo al Mare, in the Liguria region, northwestern Italy. Opened in 1872, it formed part of the Genoa–Ventimiglia railway, and was situated about two thirds along the way from Genoa towards Ventimiglia. It was replaced on December 11, 2016, by a new station in Diano Castello, Diano, situated on a new double-track line replacing the old coastal route.

The station's reception building featured a waiting room and ticket machine. The trains were operated by Trenitalia.

== Train services ==
The station was last served by the following service(s):

- Regional services (Treno regionale) Ventimiglia - Savona - Genoa - Sestri Levante - La Spezia - San Stefano di Magra

== See also ==
- History of rail transport in Italy
- List of railway stations in Liguria
- Rail transport in Italy
- Railway stations in Italy
