= Finale Ligure Marina railway station =

Railway station in Italy

Finale Ligure Marina
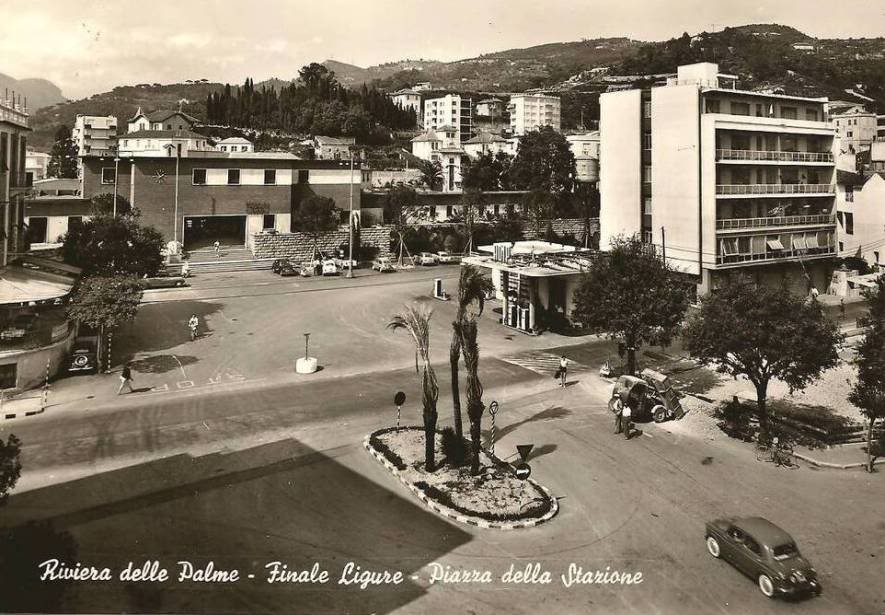
- Finale Ligure Marina railway station.

General information
- Location: Piazzale Vittorio Veneto; 17100 Savona SV; Finale Ligure, Savona, Liguria; Italy
- Coordinates: 44°10′11″N 08°20′30″E
- Operator: Rete Ferroviaria Italiana
- Line: Genoa–Ventimiglia railway
- Distance: 58.42 km (36.30 mi) from Genova Piazza Principe
- Train operators: Trenitalia

Construction
- Architect: Roberto Narducci

Other information
- Classification: Silver

History
- Opened: 1872; 154 years ago
- Former names: Finalmarina (until 1927)
Location
- Location within Liguria Location within Northern Italy Location within Italy

Finale Ligure Marina railway station (Italian: Stazione di Finale Ligure Marina) serves the town of Finale Ligure, in the Liguria region, northwestern Italy. Opened in 1872, it forms part of the Genoa–Ventimiglia railway. The train services are operated by Trenitalia.

== History ==
The station was called Finalmarina until 1927 when its name was changed to Finale Ligure Marina. The station building was designed by Roberto Narducci and was built in 1938.

== Train services ==
The station is served by the following train service(s):

- Intercity services Ventimiglia - Savona - Genoa - La Spezia - Pisa - Livorno - Rome
- Intercity services Ventimiglia - Savona - Genoa - Milan
- Regional services (Treno regionale) Ventimiglia - Savona - Genoa - Sestri Levante - La Spezia - San Stefano di Magra.

In addition, there is connections to Bus services from Savona, about half an hour, and to Finalborgo, about 15 minutes; a youth hostel is also close by. The Museo Archeologico del Finale is also reached by bus connection to Finalborgo, or a 1.4 km or 1 mile walk from the Station.

== See also ==
- History of rail transport in Italy
- List of railway stations in Liguria
- Rail transport in Italy
- Railway stations in Italy
