= Andora railway station =

Railway station in Italy

Andora

General information
- Location: Andora, Savona, Liguria; Italy
- Coordinates: 43°57′36″N 08°08′20″E
- Operator: Rete Ferroviaria Italiana; Centostazioni
- Line: Genoa–Ventimiglia railway
- Distance: 94.18 km (58.52 mi) from Genova Piazza Principe
- Platforms: 2
- Tracks: 2
- Train operators: Trenitalia
- Connections: Urban and suburban buses

Other information
- Classification: Silver

History
- Opened: 11 December 2016; 9 years ago
Location
- Location within Liguria Location within Northern Italy Location within Italy

Andora railway station (Italian: Stazione di Andora) is a railway station serving the town of Andora, in Liguria, northwestern Italy. It is located on the Genoa–Ventimiglia railway and was opened on 11 December 2016. Train services are operated by Trenitalia.

The station was built to replace the original Andora station, which dated back to 1872. It was opened as part of an 18.8 km (11.7 mi) new double-track railway between Andora and San Lorenzo, which runs largely through tunnels, rather than winding along the coast.

== Train services ==
The station is served by the following service(s):

- Regional services (Treno regionale) Ventimiglia – Savona – Genoa – Sestri Levante – La Spezia – San Stefano di Magra

== See also ==
- History of rail transport in Italy
- List of railway stations in Liguria
- Rail transport in Italy
- Railway stations in Italy
