= Railway stations in Genoa =

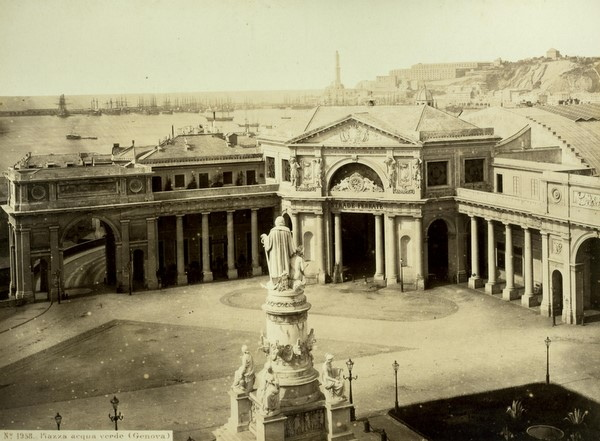
Genova Piazza Principe

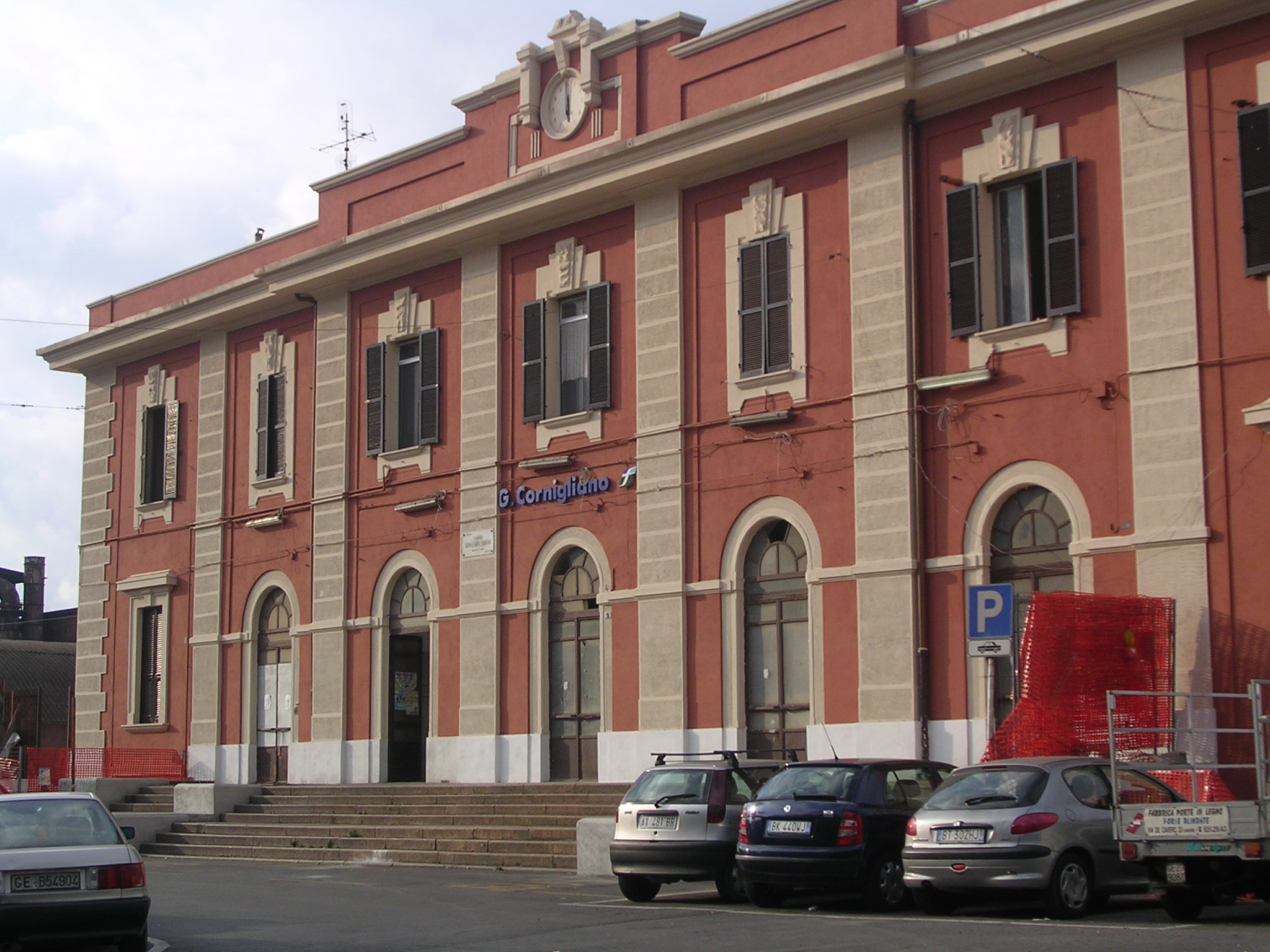
Genova Cornigliano

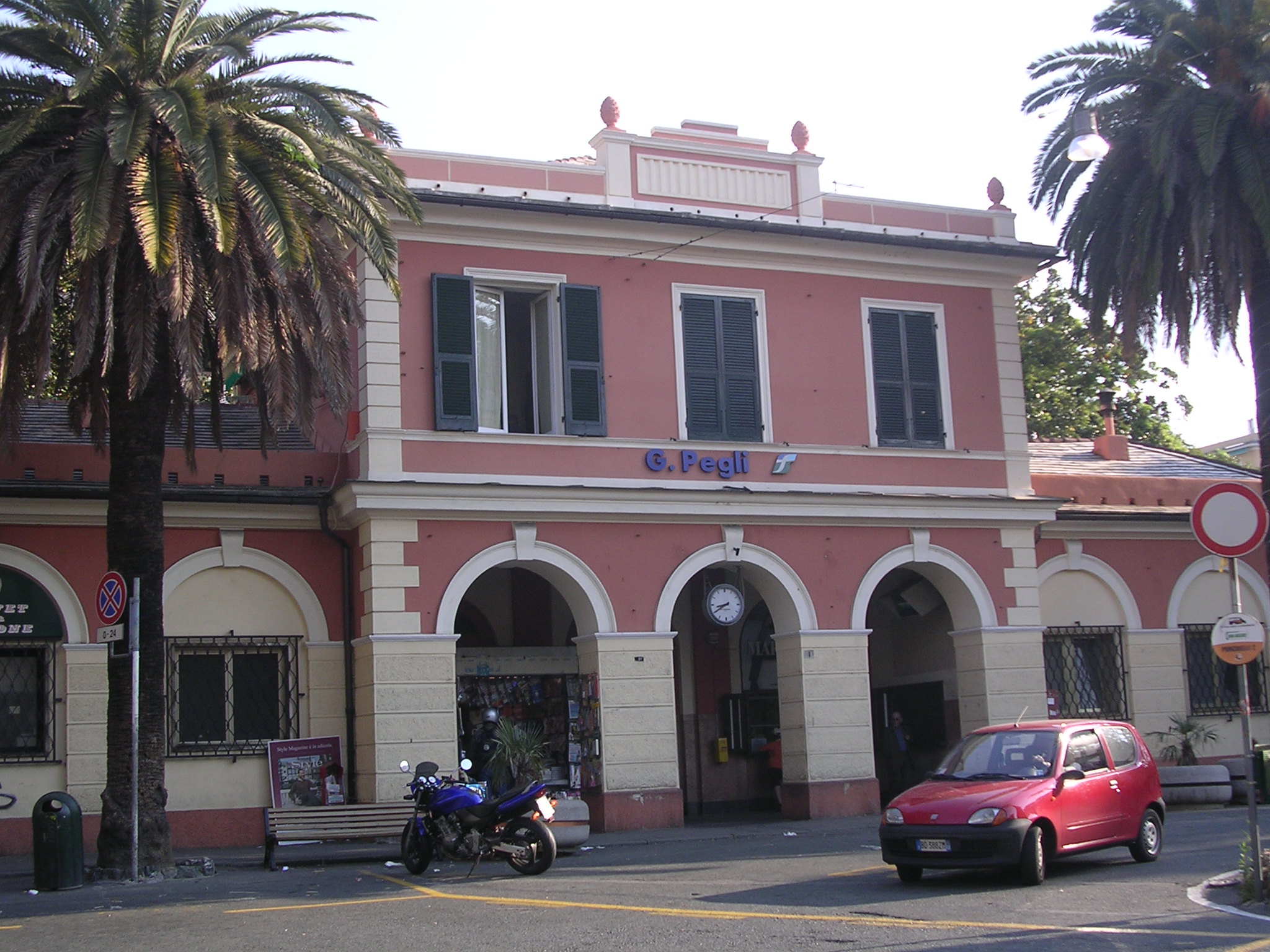
Genova Pegli

The city and comune of Genoa, capital of the region of Liguria, northwestern Italy, has twenty-six railway stations and stops in use today.

The majority of these stations is managed by RFI. Four remaining stations, Genova Piazza Manin and others, are operated by AMT.

The only station in Genoa that has been completely closed without being replaced is Sant'Ilario, in the Genoa district of that name.

== Chronological list of stations ==
Name	Inauguration	Current state	Type	Manager
Bolzaneto	1853	In use	Through station, surface	RFI
Pontedecimo	1853	In use	Through station, surface	RFI
Rivarolo	1853	In use	Through station, surface	RFI
Sampierdarena	1853	In use	Through station, surface	RFI/Centostazioni
Pegli	1856	In use	Through station, surface	RFI
Sestri Ponente	1856	In use	Through station, surface	RFI
Piazza Principe	1860	In use	Terminal/through station, surface	RFI/Grandi Stazioni
Brignole (v1)	1868	Not in use	Terminal station, surface	RFI
Nervi	1868	In use	Through station, surface	RFI
Quarto dei Mille	1868	In use	Through station, surface	RFI
Sant'Ilario	1868	Sold	Through station, surface	N/A
Vesima	1868	In use	Through station, surface	RFI
Voltri	1868	In use	Through station, surface	RFI
Acquasanta	1894	In use	Through station, surface	RFI
Borzoli	1894	In use	Through station, surface	RFI
Granara	1894	In use	Through station, surface	RFI
Brignole (v2)	1905	In use	Terminal station, surface	RFI/Grandi Stazioni
Sturla	1915	In use	Through station, surface	RFI
Quinto al Mare	1922	In use	Through station, surface	RFI
Piazza Manin	1929	In use	Terminal station, surface	AMT (Genoa)
San Pantaleo	1929	In use	Through station, surface	AMT (Genoa)
Sant'Antonino	1929	In use	Through station, surface	AMT (Genoa)
Cappuccio	1929	In use	Through station, surface	AMT (Genoa)
Cornigliano	1930s	In use	Through station, surface	RFI
Costa	1994	In use	Through station, surface	RFI
San Biagio	2005	In use	Through station, surface	RFI
Via di Francia	2005	In use	Through station, surface	RFI
Pra	2006	In use	Through station, surface	RFI

== See also ==
- History of rail transport in Italy
- List of railway stations in Liguria
- Rail transport in Italy
- Railway stations in Italy
