= Diano railway station =

Railway station in Italy

Diano
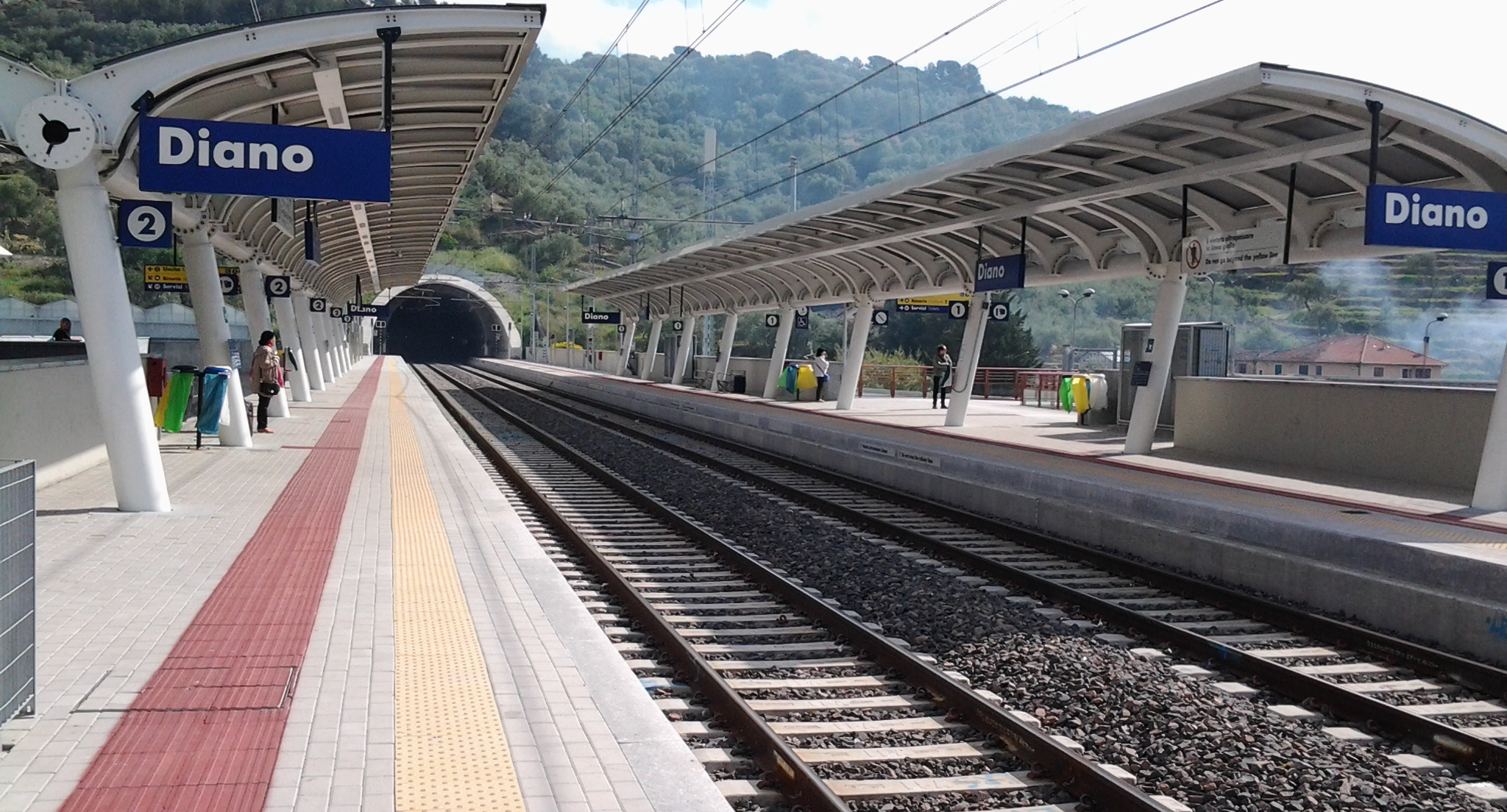

General information
- Location: Diano Castello, Imperia, Liguria; Italy
- Coordinates: 43°55′29″N 08°04′21″E
- Operator: Rete Ferroviaria Italiana; Centostazioni
- Line: Genoa–Ventimiglia railway
- Distance: 104.096 km (64.682 mi) from Genova Piazza Principe
- Platforms: 2
- Tracks: 2
- Train operators: Trenitalia
- Connections: Urban and suburban buses

Other information
- Classification: Silver

History
- Opened: 11 December 2016; 9 years ago
Location
- Location within Liguria Location within Northern Italy Location within Italy

Diano railway station (Italian: Stazione di Diano) is a railway station serving the town of Diano Castello, in Liguria, northwestern Italy. The station is located on the Genoa–Ventimiglia railway and was opened on 11 December 2016. The train services are operated by Trenitalia.

The station was built to replace the former station Diano Marina. The station was opened as part of an 18.8 km new double-track railway between Andora and San Lorenzo which operates largely through tunnels, rather than winding along the coast.

== Train services ==
The station is served by the following service(s):

- EuroCity services (Thello) Marseille - Cannes - Nice - Monaco - Ventimiglia - Genoa - Milan
- Intercity services Ventimiglia - Savona - Genoa - La Spezia - Pisa - Livorno - Rome
- Intercity services Ventimiglia - Savona - Genoa - Milan
- Regional services (Treno regionale) Ventimiglia - Savona - Genoa - Sestri Levante - La Spezia - San Stefano di Magra

== See also ==
- History of rail transport in Italy
- List of railway stations in Liguria
- Rail transport in Italy
- Railway stations in Italy
