= Rapallo railway station =

Railway station in Italy

Rapallo
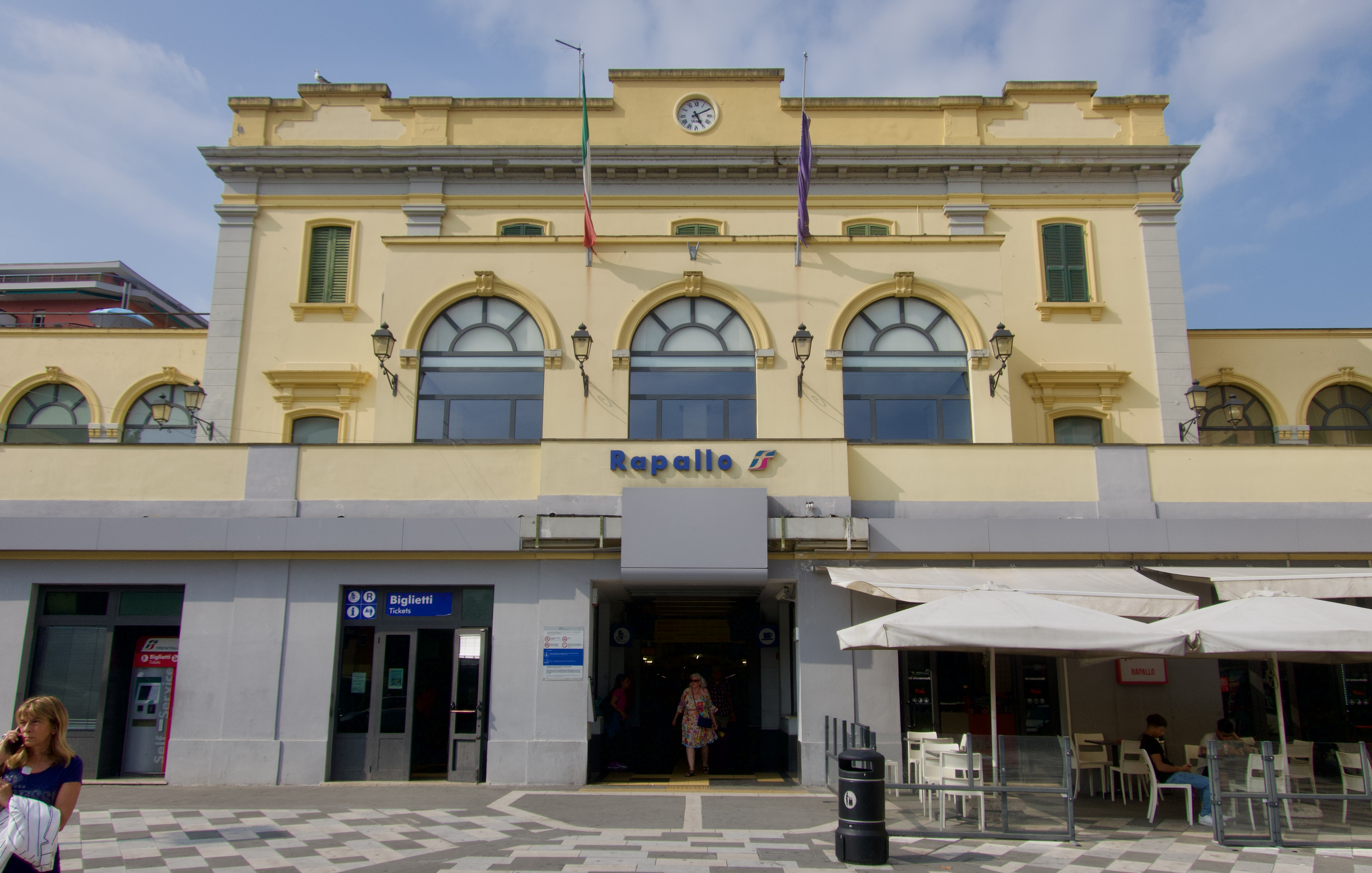
- Front entrance

General information
- Location: Piazza dei Molfino; 16035 Rapallo GE; Rapallo, Genoa, Liguria; Italy
- Coordinates: 44°21′04″N 09°13′52″E
- Operator: Rete Ferroviaria Italiana; Centostazioni
- Line: Pisa–La Spezia–Genoa
- Distance: 29.193 km (18.140 mi) from Genova Piazza Principe
- Train operators: Trenitalia
- Connections: Urban and suburban buses

Other information
- Classification: Gold

History
- Opened: 31 October 1868; 157 years ago
Location
- Location within Liguria Location within Northern Italy Location within Italy

Rapallo railway station (Italian: Stazione di Rapallo) serves the town and comune of Rapallo, in the Liguria region, northwestern Italy. Opened in 1868, it forms part of the Pisa–La Spezia–Genoa railway, and is situated between La Spezia and Genoa.

The station is currently managed by Rete Ferroviaria Italiana (RFI). However, the commercial area of the passenger building is managed by Centostazioni. Train services to and from the station are operated by Trenitalia. All of these companies are subsidiaries of Ferrovie dello Stato (FS), Italy's state-owned rail company.

== Location ==
The station is located at Piazza dei Molfino, right in the centre of the town.

== History ==
On 7 November 1859, at the request of the Kingdom of Sardinia (soon to become part of the Kingdom of Italy), a resolution was proposed in the Rapallo city council for a railway linking the Italian Riviera with La Spezia, and ultimately with Rome. On 27 October 1860, the resolution was approved, and the necessary significant construction work authorised.

In relation to the railway line, or more specifically to its routing, significant conflict broke out between neighboring towns in the Golfo Paradiso and Tigullio Occidentale districts. As the construction of the railway proceeded very slowly, mainly due to the structure of the terrain, the two comuni of Recco and Rapallo decided to make a combined request to the Ministry of Public Works for a change to the routing. The two comuni proposed a design for a direct connection between themselves, and then passing under the Mount of Portofino, in place of the proposed "on paper" stations at Camogli and Santa Margherita Ligure.

The two latter comuni did not wait long to respond. They also appealed to the Ministry, in opposition to the new proposed project. In 1862, the Ministry decided definitively to reject the Rapallo–Recco proposal, prompting congratulations from the other two coastal municipalities. Thus, the railway ultimately followed the route previously chosen in 1859.

In 1867, there was once again an appeal by the town of Rapallo to divert the route slightly, and this ended up causing the demolition of the chapel of St. Augustine, which was in the way.

On the morning of 31 October 1868, after years of hard work, a steam locomotive embarked on its maiden voyage from San Michele di Pagana railway station to Rapallo. Regular passenger services commenced on 5 December 1868.

Further changes occurred to the railway in 1909, at the request of the municipalities of Recco and Rapallo, and prompted by the first train crash in the resort of Santa Margherita Ligure on 23 August of that year. The changes included a significant expansion of the Rapallo station, making the passenger building larger than its predecessor.

== Features ==
The passenger building has recently undergone a sympathetic restoration. This included the repainting of the facade in a new yellow-red colour scheme (replacing the former pink and white colours) and a move of the ticket office from the first floor to the ground floor. The old goods yard, used mostly only for the unloading of goods, is now no longer used, except for the stabling of rolling stock owned by private railways. The former perimeter of the goods yard is now part of a new parking garage owned and operated by Trenitalia.

Despite the importance of the station, its track layout has recently been transformed, under operation "rete snella" (streamlined network), into a mere halting point, with no secondary tracks or points. Similar changes have also been made to several other stations on the line.

== Passenger and train movements ==
The station has about 2.3 million passenger movements each year. It is served by all regional trains, and also some InterCity and Eurostar Italia trains.

== Interchange ==
In the square in front of the station, there are bus stops for bus services to San Michele, Santa Maria, Savagna, Ruta and Pianello.

== See also ==
- History of rail transport in Italy
- List of railway stations in Liguria
- Rail transport in Italy
- Railway stations in Italy
