= Santuario railway station =

Railway station in Italy

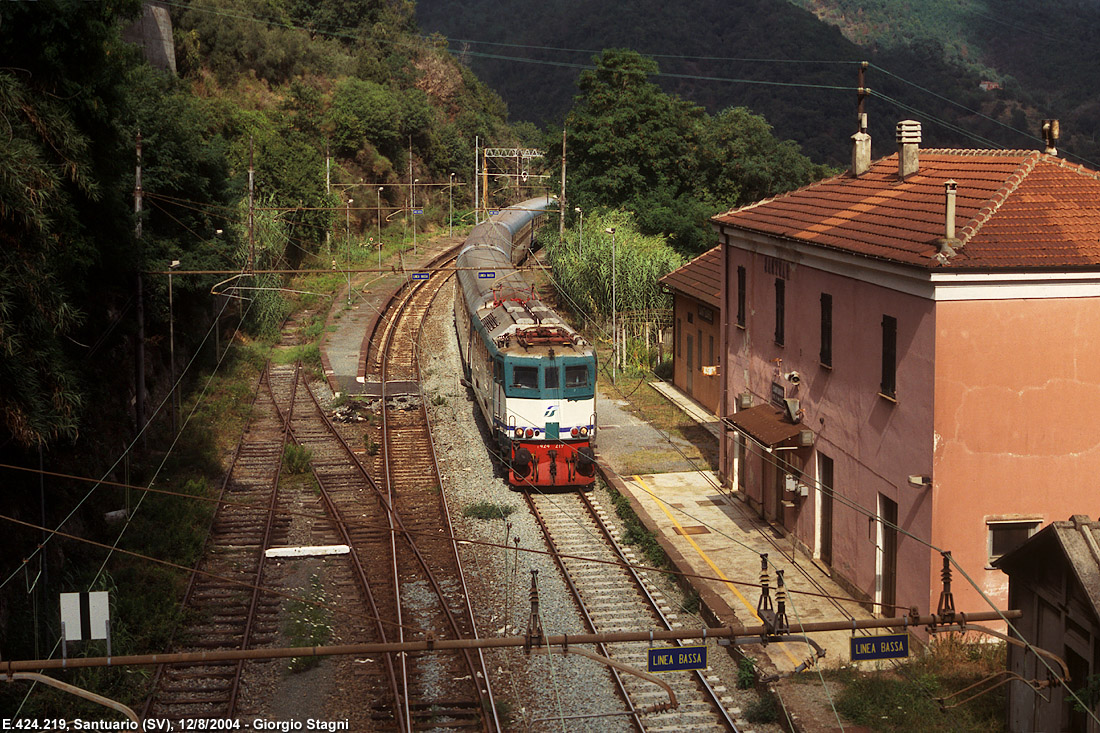
- A train hauled by locomotive E.424.219 entering the station.

General information
- Location: Savona; Italy
- Coordinates: 44°20′45.96″N 8°26′8.63″E
- Manager: Rete Ferroviaria Italiana
- Line: Turin–Fossano–Savona railway
- Distance: kilometric point 5.664
- Platforms: 1 side platform
- Tracks: 3

Construction
- Structure type: at-grade

History
- Opened: 28 September 1874
Location

Santuario railway station is a railway station located along the Turin–Fossano–Savona railway, serving the Santuario neighbourhood, in Savona, Italy. It takes its name from the Sanctuary of Our Lady of Mercy, some 300 metres (980 ft) from the station.

== History ==
Santuario station was opened in 1874, when the line was extended from Ceva to Savona.

== Operations ==
The station is served, on average, by seven daily regional trains operated by Trenitalia of the Alessandria-Savona relationship as part of the service contract with the Regional Government of Liguria.
