= Montoggio =

Montoggio Monteuggio
- Comune
- Comune di Montoggio
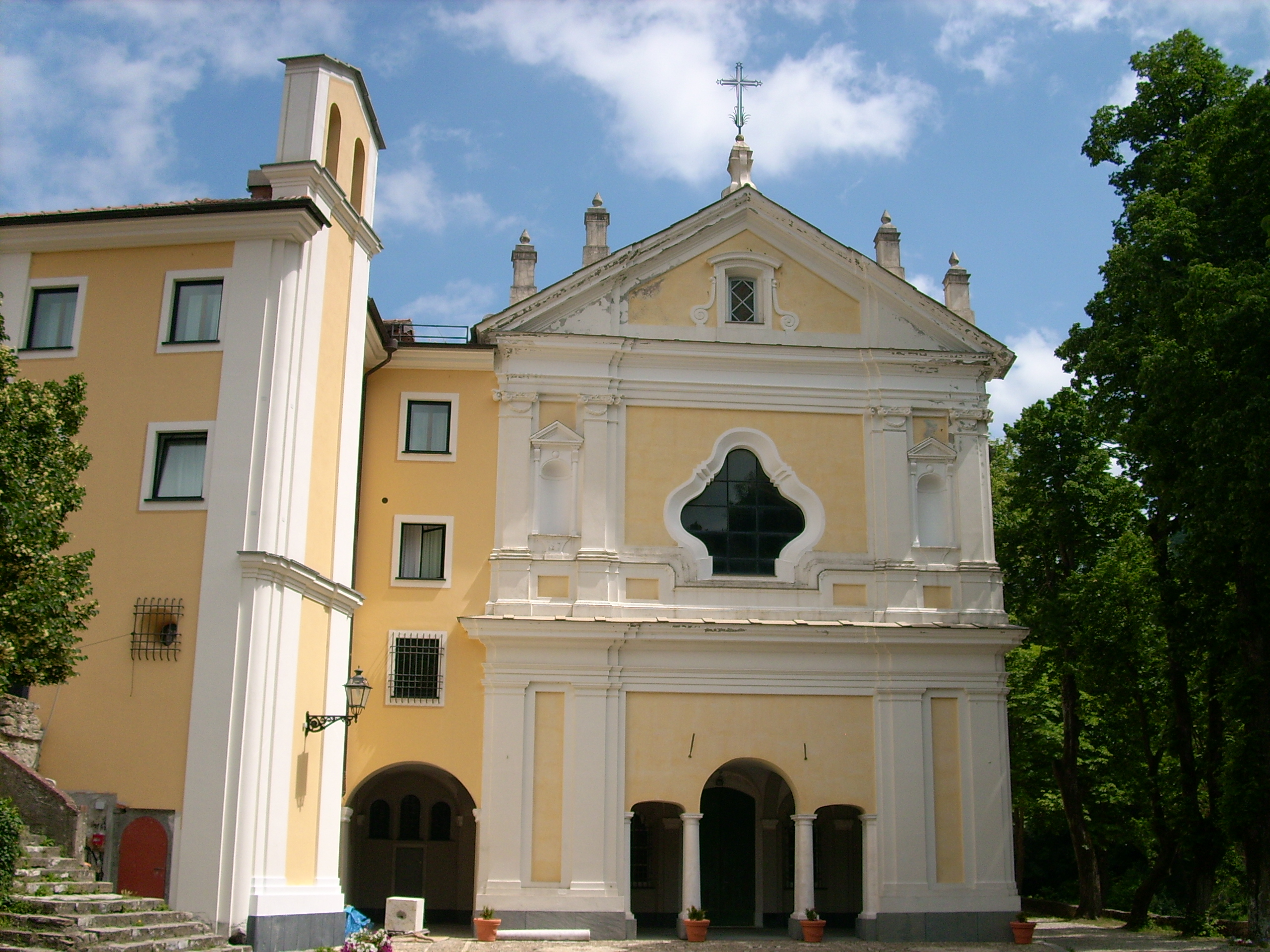
- Church

- Location within Italy Location within Liguria
- Coordinates: 44°31′N 9°3′E
- Country: Italy
- Region: Liguria
- Metropolitan city: Genoa (GE)
- Frazioni: Acquafredda inferiore, Acquafredda superiore, Barche, Bargagliotti, Bromia, Brugosecco, Ca’, Ca’ Giacomini, Cagliardo, Campelo, Camponevoso, Campovecchio, Casà, Casalino, Carpi inferiore, Carpi superiore, Cascinette, Case vecchie di Carsegli, Cagliasca, Castello, Castiglione, Chiappa, Chiappari, Cravasco, Creto, Colletta, Ciana dei Ponti, Costa inferiore, Costa superiore, Cognole di Carsegli, Cognole dei Ponti, Cornaggiana, Corneto, Cuneo dei Corsi, Dego, Fascioli, Feglietto, Fontana Chiappa, Fontanasse, Fregagliasse, Gazzolo, Gorretta, Granara, Luega, Maglioni, Matallo, Montemoro, Morasco, Noci, Piandeiso, Prele, Pratolungo, Ponti, Pratogrande, Pianoguani, Rivè, Sanguineto inferiore, Sanguineto superiore, Sella, Serrato, Soriva inferiore, Soriva superiore, Terme, Tre Fontane, Vallecalde, Veixe, Rione, Poggio, Montebano

Area
  - Total: 46.4 km^{2} (17.9 sq mi)
- Elevation: 438 m (1,437 ft)

Population (Oct. 2006)
  - Total: 2,018
  - Density: 43.5/km^{2} (113/sq mi)
- Demonym: Montoggini
- Time zone: UTC+1 (CET)
  - Summer (DST): UTC+2 (CEST)
- Postal code: 16026
- Dialing code: 010
- Website: Official website

Montoggio (Ligurian: Monteuggio) is a comune (municipality) in the Metropolitan City of Genoa in the Italian region Liguria, located about 14 kilometres (9 mi) northeast of Genoa. As of October 2006, it had a population of 2,018 and an area of 46.4 square kilometres (17.9 mi^{2}).

== Antropic geography ==
The municipality of Montoggio contains the frazioni (subdivisions, mainly villages and hamlets):

- Acquafredda inferiore
- Acquafredda superiore
- Barche
- Bargagliotti
- Bromia
- Brugosecco
- Ca’
- Ca’ Giacomini
- Cagliardo
- Campelo
- Camponevoso
- Campovecchio
- Casà
- Casalino
- Carpi inferiore
- Carpi superiore
- Cascinette
- Case vecchie di Carsegli
- Cagliasca
- Castello
- Castiglione
- Chiappa
- Chiappari
- Cravasco
- Creto
- Colletta
- Ciana dei Ponti
- Costa inferiore
- Costa superiore
- Cognole di Carsegli
- Cognole dei Ponti
- Cornaggiana
- Corneto
- Cuneo dei Corsi
- Dego
- Fascioli
- Feglietto
- Fontana Chiappa
- Fontanasse
- Fregagliasse
- Gazzolo
- Gorretta
- Granara
- Luega
- Maglioni
- Matallo
- Montemoro
- Morasco
- Noci
- Piandeiso
- Prele
- Pratolungo
- Ponti
- Pratogrande
- Pianoguani
- Rivè
- Sanguineto inferiore
- Sanguineto superiore
- Sella
- Serrato
- Soriva inferiore
- Soriva superiore
- Terme
- Tre Fontane
- Vallecalde
- Veixe
- Rione
- Poggio
- Montebano

Montoggio borders the following municipalities: Casella, Davagna, Genoa, Sant'Olcese, Serra Riccò, Torriglia, Valbrevenna.

== Demographic evolution ==
Historical population

Year	Pop.	±%
1861	3,573	—
1871	3,824	+7.0%
1881	3,987	+4.3%
1901	3,629	−9.0%
1911	3,368	−7.2%

Year	Pop.	±%
1921	3,286	−2.4%
1931	3,366	+2.4%
1936	3,164	−6.0%
1951	2,814	−11.1%
1961	2,267	−19.4%

Year	Pop.	±%
1971	1,824	−19.5%
1981	1,906	+4.5%
1991	1,934	+1.5%
2001	1,988	+2.8%

Source: Data from ISTAT

== Twin towns ==
Montoggio is twinned with:

- Radomyšl, Czech Republic (2006)
- Zonza, France (2006)

== See also ==
- Monte Alpesisa

== Gallery ==
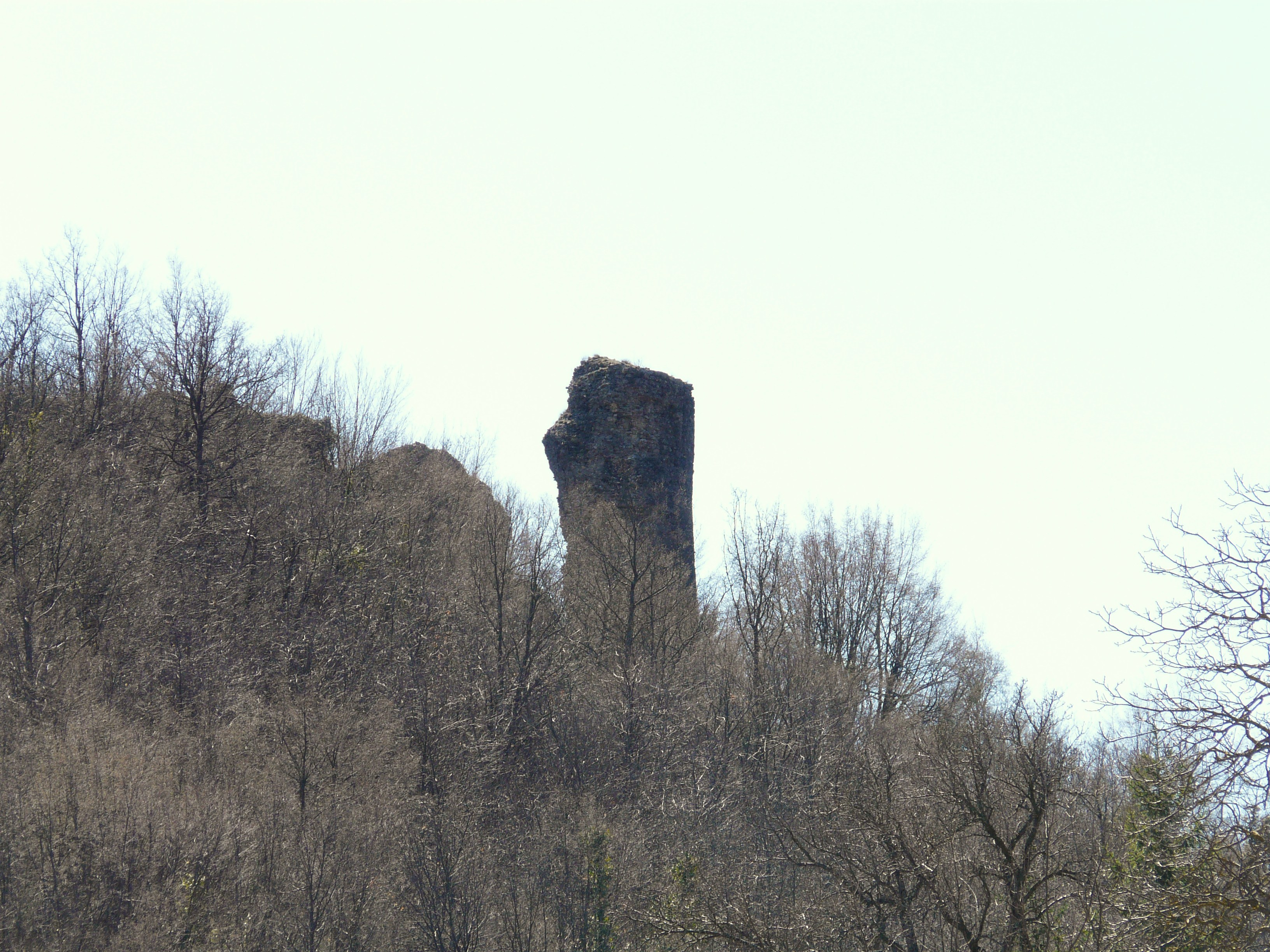
Ruins of Montoggio Castle

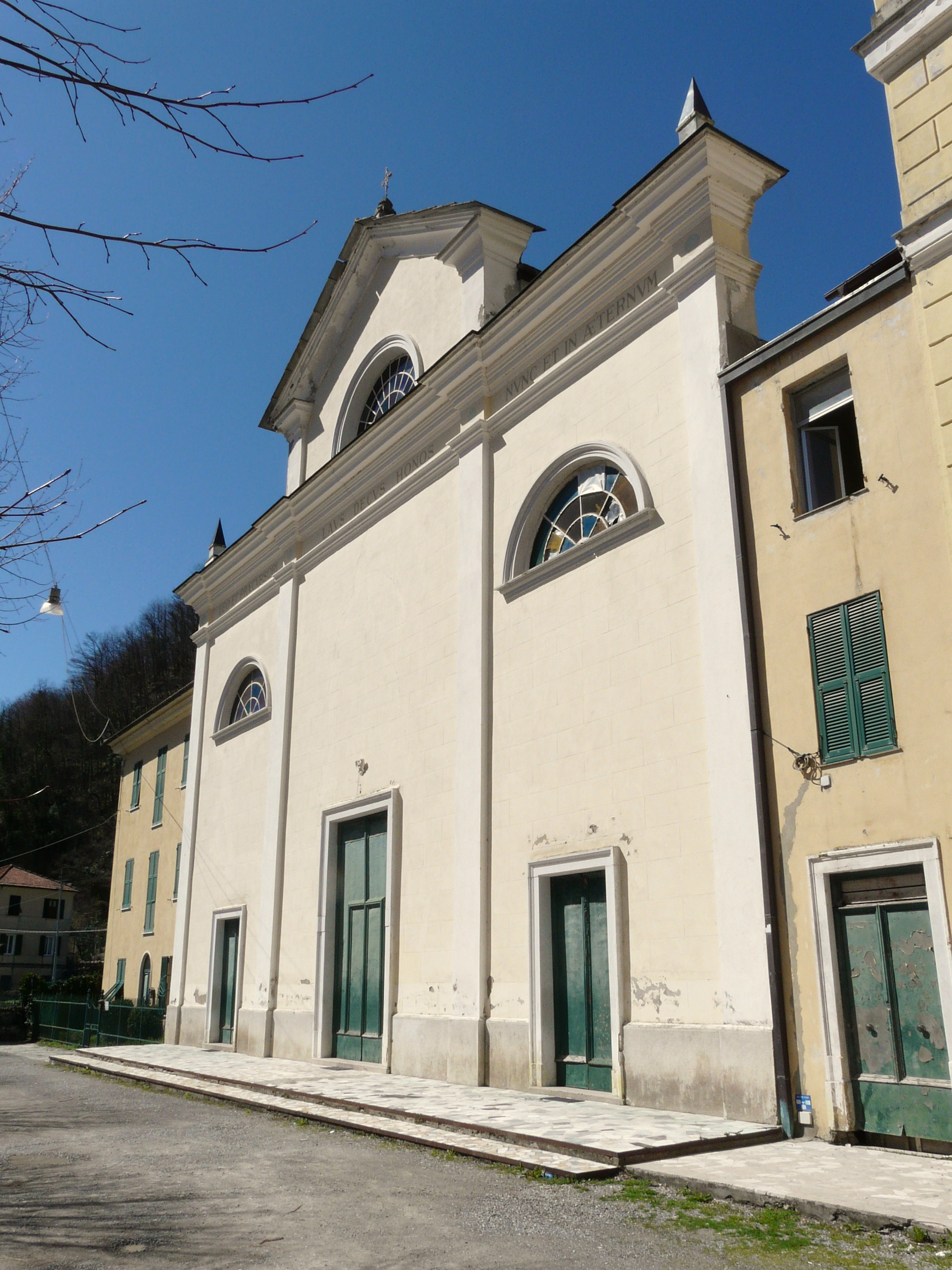
San Giovanni Decollato church

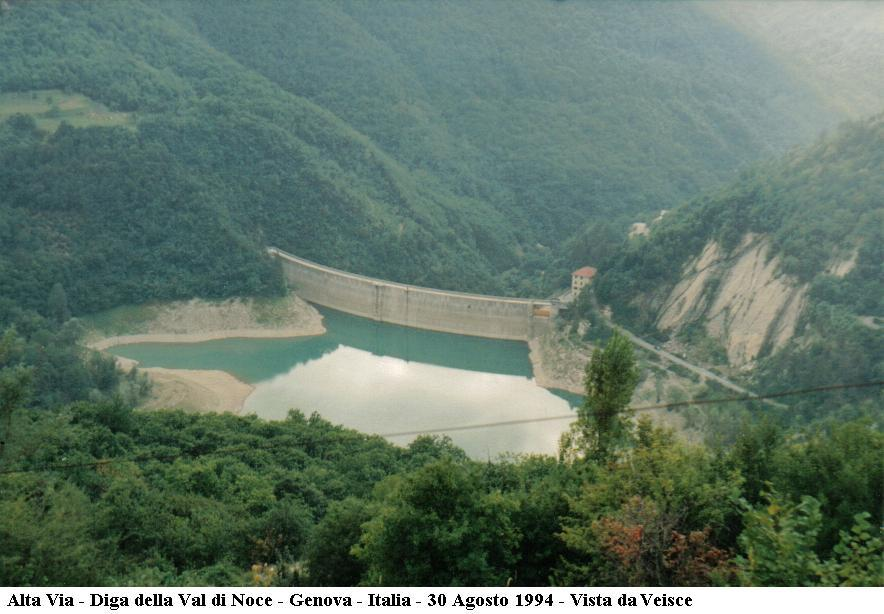
Val di Noce dam - 1994 - View from Veisce

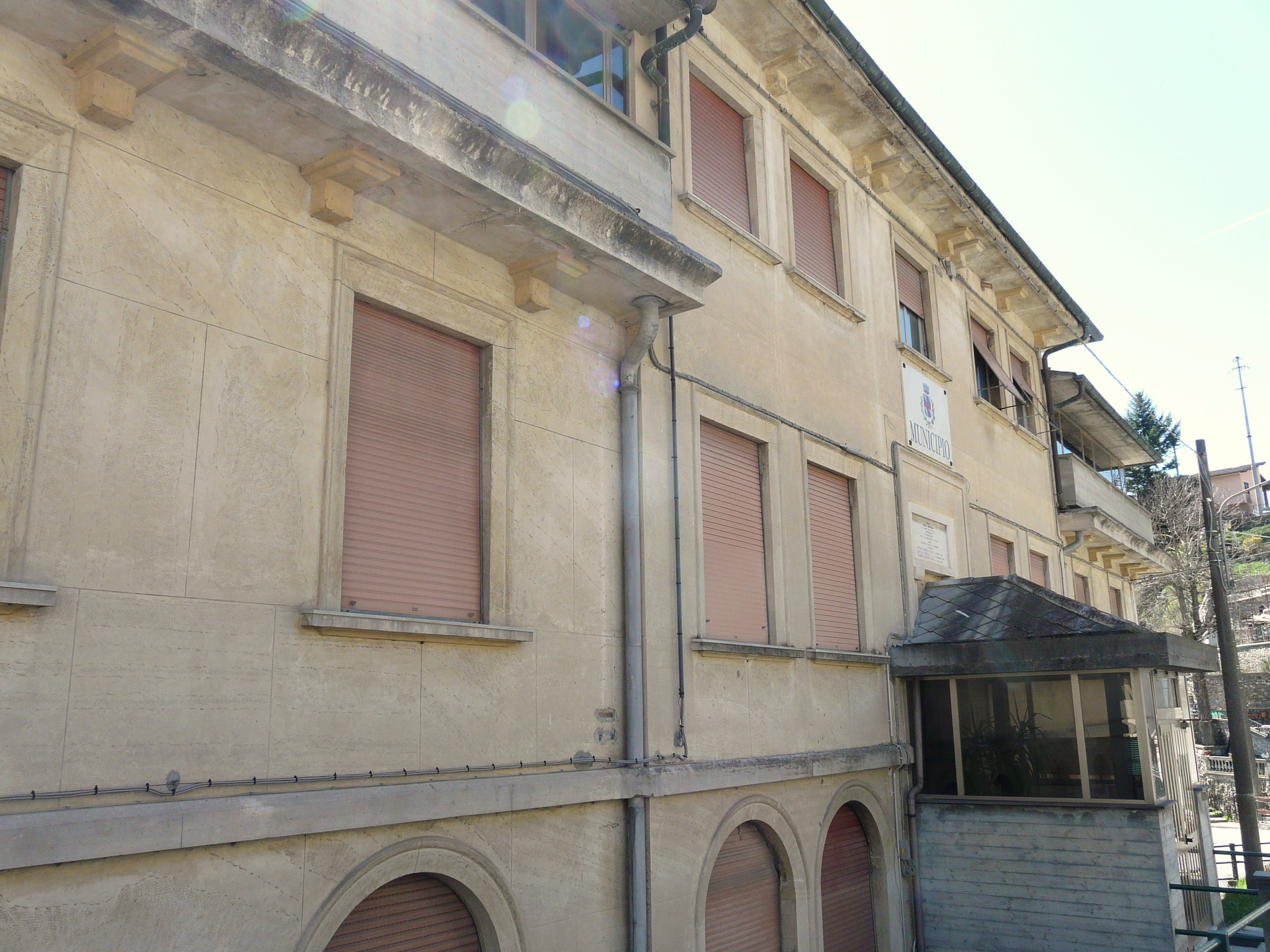
Town hall

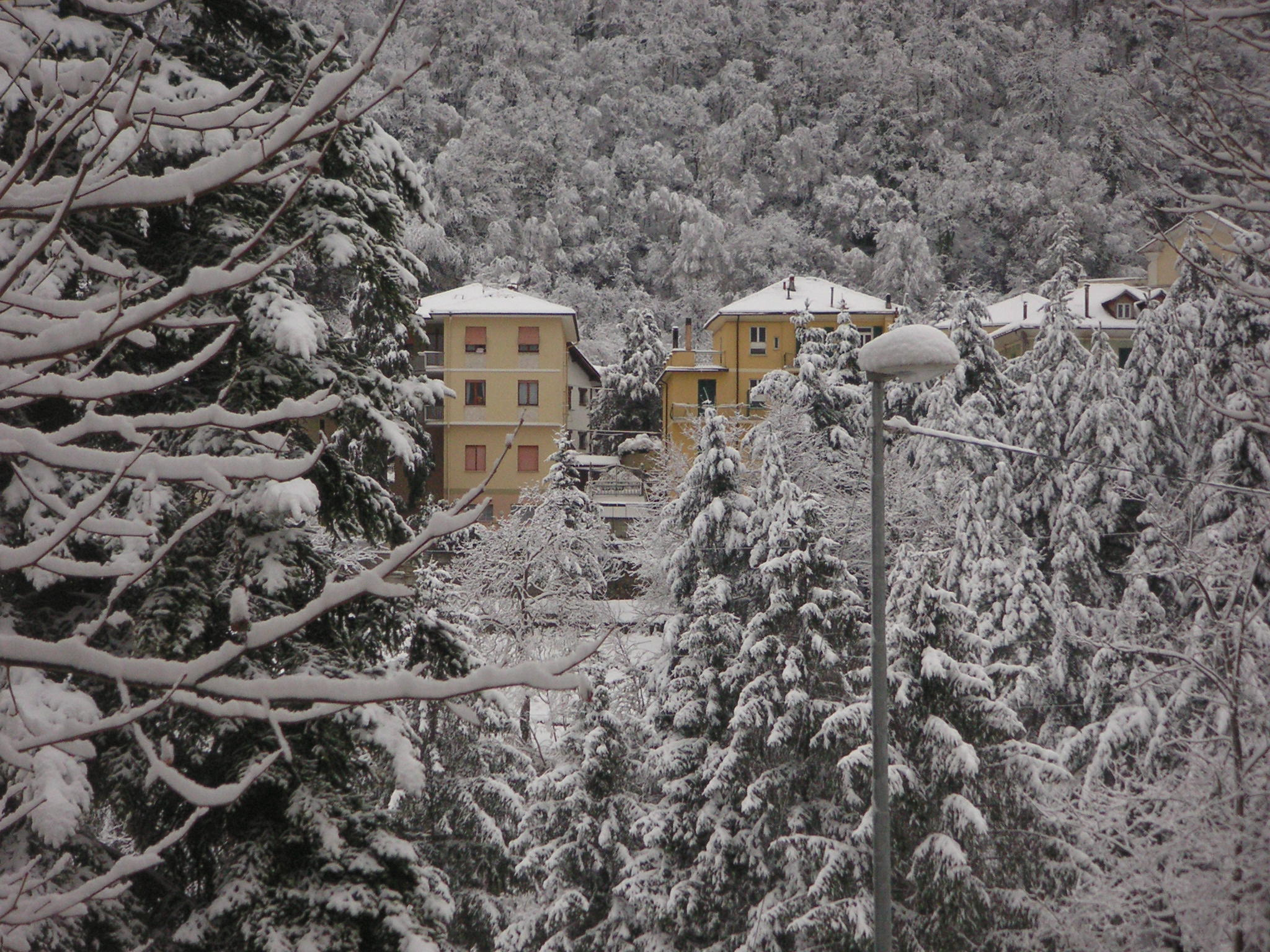
Snow

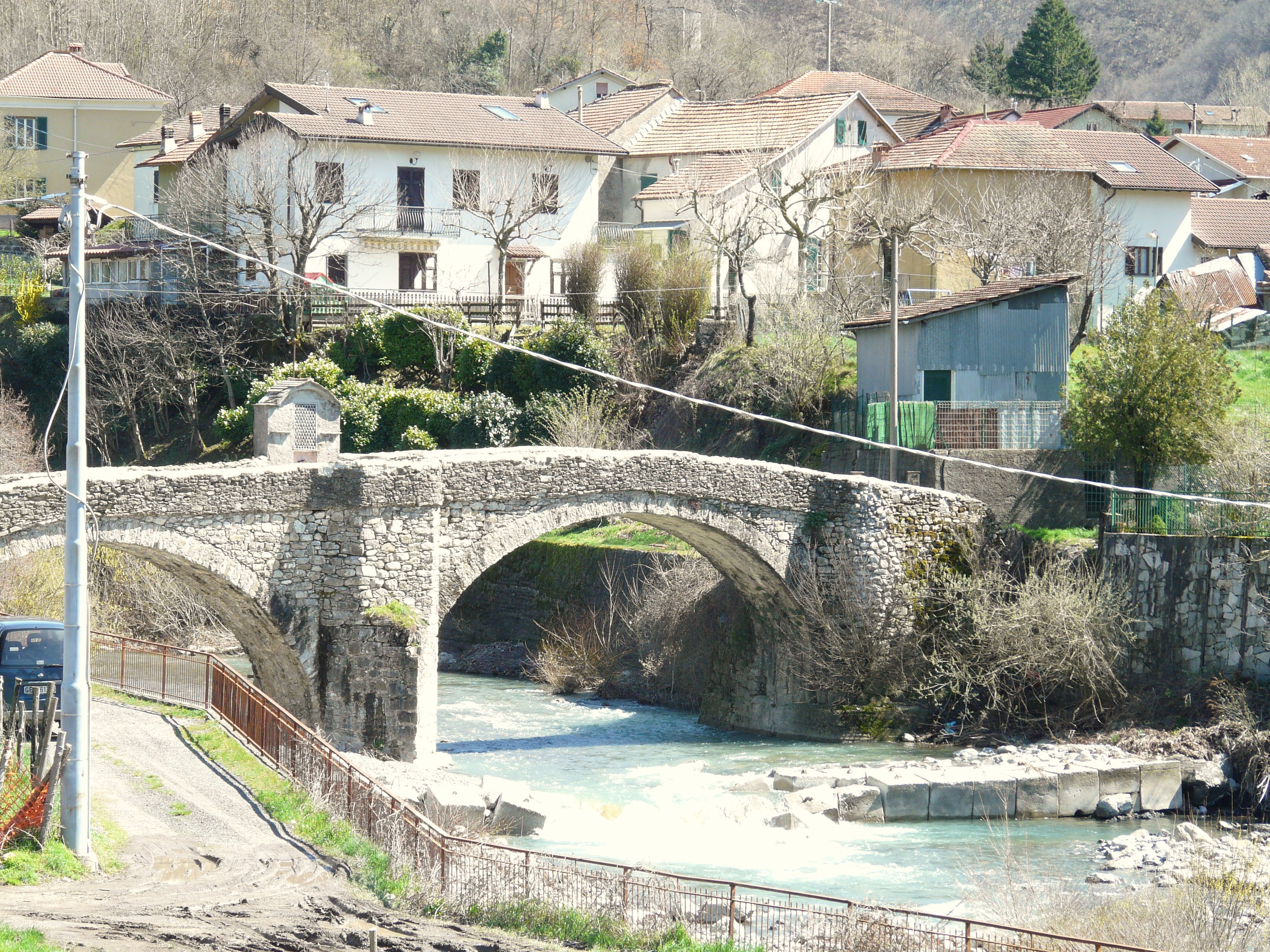
Medieval bridge
