= Savona railway station =

Railway station in Savona, Italy

Savona
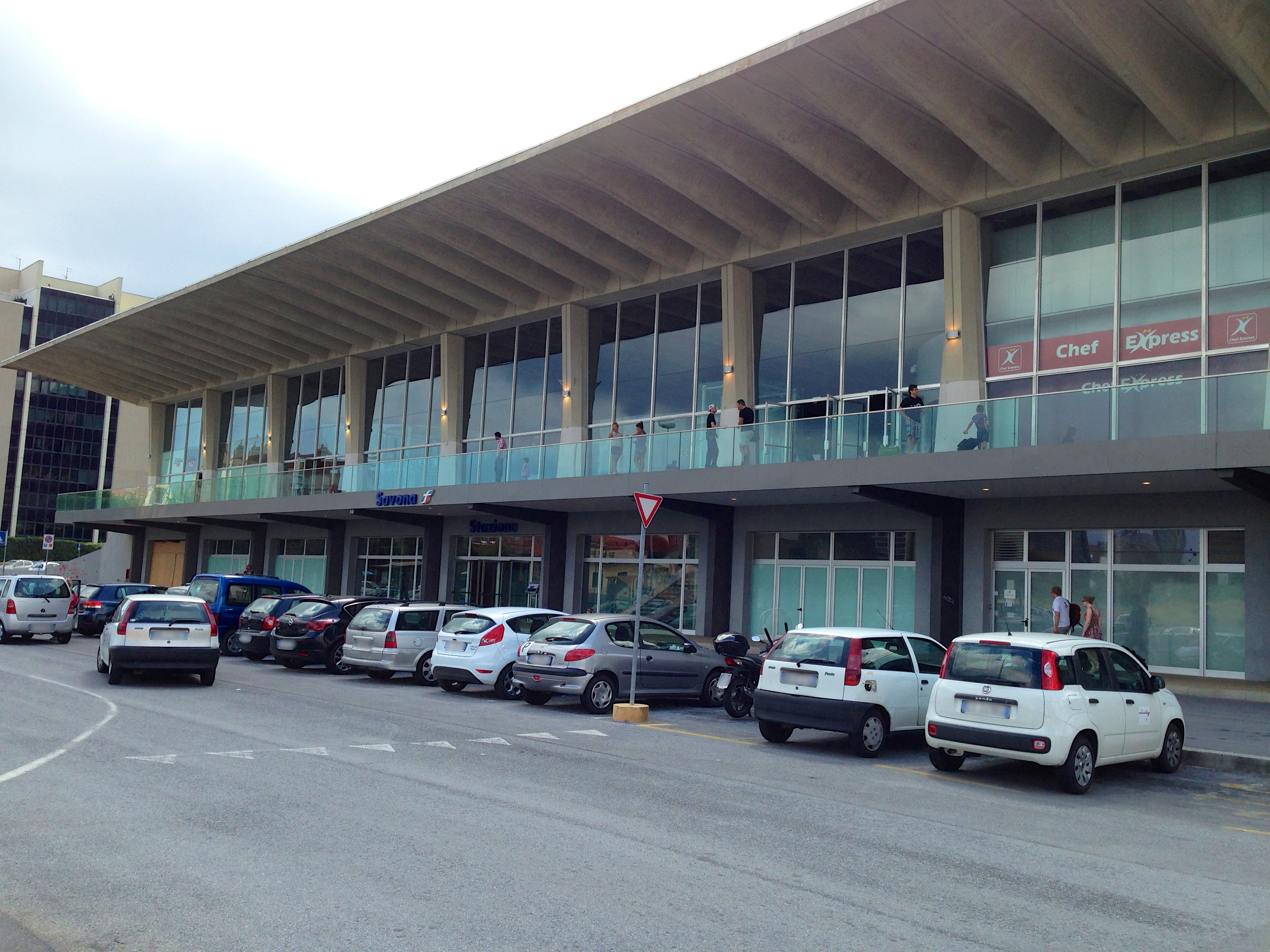
- Savona railway station.

General information
- Location: Piazza Aldo Moro; 17100 Savona SV; Savona, Savona, Liguria
- Coordinates: 44°18′25″N 08°28′13″E
- Operator: Rete Ferroviaria Italiana; Centostazioni
- Lines: Genoa–Ventimiglia; Turin–Fossano–Savona
- Distance: 39.10 km (24.30 mi) from Genova Piazza Principe
- Train operators: Trenitalia

Construction
- Architect: Pier Luigi Nervi

Other information
- Classification: Gold

History
- Opened: 1977; 49 years ago
Location
- Location within Liguria Location within Northern Italy Location within Italy

Savona railway station (Italian: Stazione di Savona) serves the seaport and comune of Savona, in the Liguria region, northwestern Italy. Opened in 1977, it forms part of the Genoa–Ventimiglia railway, and is situated just over one quarter of the way from Genoa towards Ventimiglia. It is also the western terminus of the Turin–Fossano–Savona railway.

The station is currently managed by Rete Ferroviaria Italiana (RFI). However, the commercial area of the passenger building is managed by Centostazioni. Train services to and from the station are operated by Trenitalia. Each of these companies is a subsidiary of Ferrovie dello Stato (FS), Italy's state-owned rail company.

== Location ==
The station is located in the Mongrifone district of Savona, at Piazza Aldo Moro.

== History ==
The present Savona railway station was built between 1959 and 1962 by architect Pier Luigi Nervi, to replace the older and more centrally located Savona Letimbro railway station. Its construction anticipated the then future doubling of the Genoa-Ventimiglia railway, which at that time followed a single-track path located mainly near the sea. The new double track line was planned to be further inland.

The completed station was officially opened in 1962, in the presence of President Antonio Segni. However, due to major construction delays the new double track line between Savona and Finale Ligure was not completed until 1977. Thus, for fifteen years the new station was a white elephant, used only occasionally by test trains operated to stabilize the embankment. Meanwhile, scheduled passenger trains continued to stop at the nineteenth century Letimbro station.

== Features ==
In 2009, the passenger building underwent a radical redesign, involving the remodelling of the interior without damage to the existing structures. As at 2010, it had a modern and streamlined appearance, with a new ticket office, a shopping mall and a new entrance facing Piazza Aldo Moro.

The station yard has nine tracks and two passing loops. The station is connected by a double-track line with the Savona Parco Doria goods yard, workshops (OMR), a locomotive depot, and Savona Marittima railway station, the latter being situated within the port area.

== Passenger movements ==
The station has about 6.2 million passenger movements each year.

== Train services ==
The station is served by the following service(s):

- Intercity services Ventimiglia - Savona - Genoa - La Spezia - Pisa - Livorno - Rome
- Intercity services Ventimiglia - Savona - Genoa - Milan
- Regional services (Treno regionale) Ventimiglia - Savona - Genoa - Sestri Levante - La Spezia - San Stefano di Magra

== See also ==
- History of rail transport in Italy
- List of railway stations in Liguria
- Rail transport in Italy
- Railway stations in Italy
