= Sant'Olcese =

Sant'Olcese Sant'Orçeise
- Comune
- Comune di Sant'Olcese
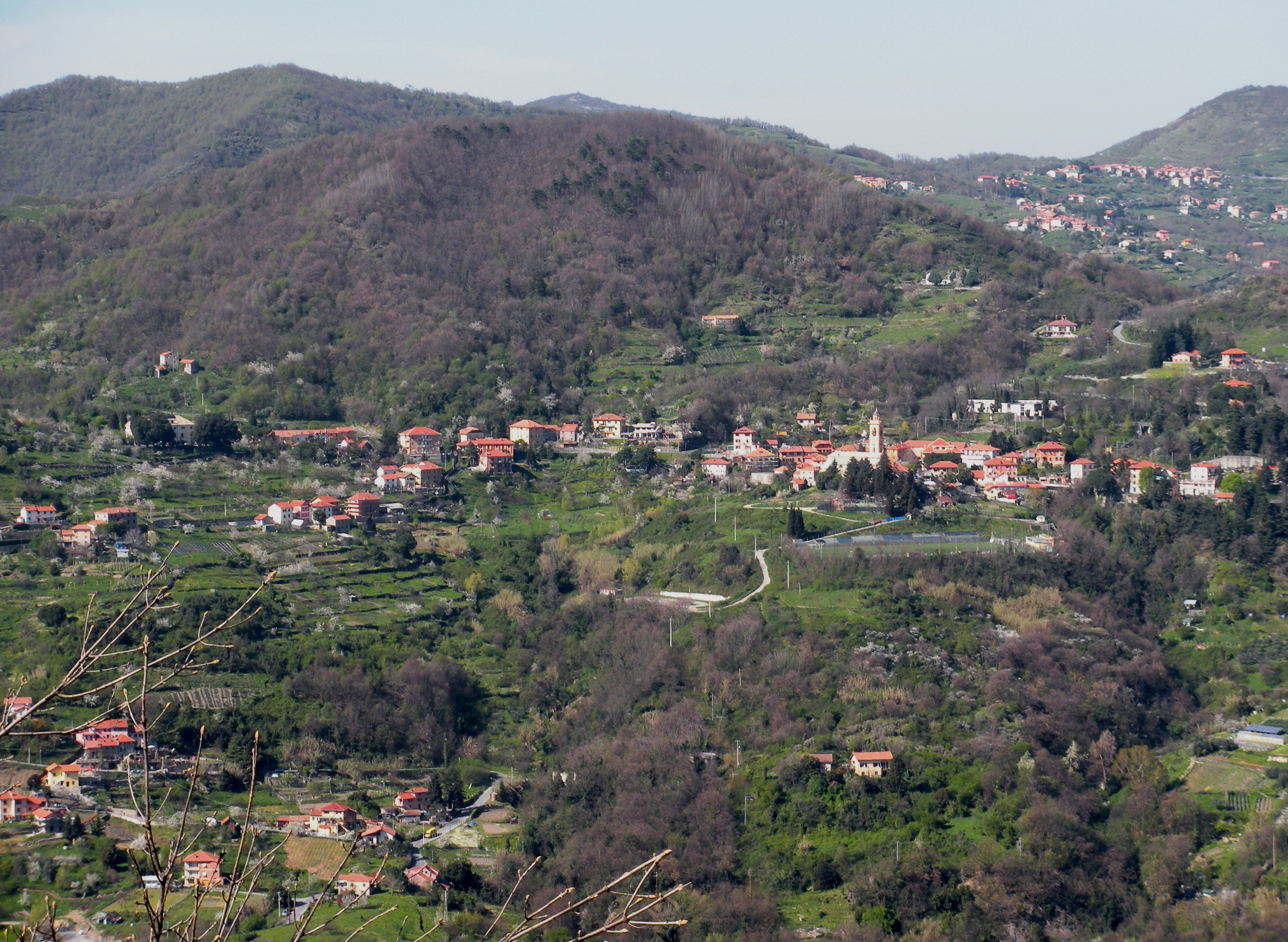
- Sant'Olcese

- Coat of arms

- Location within Italy Location within Liguria
- Coordinates: 44°28′N 8°58′E
- Country: Italy
- Region: Liguria
- Metropolitan city: Genoa (GE)
- Frazioni: Manesseno, Comago, Arvigo, Torrazza, Casanova, Trensasco, Piccarello, Vicomorasso

Area
  - Total: 21.9 km^{2} (8.5 sq mi)
- Elevation: 300 m (980 ft)

Population (Dec. 2004)
  - Total: 5,945
  - Density: 271/km^{2} (703/sq mi)
- Demonym: Santolcesini
- Time zone: UTC+1 (CET)
  - Summer (DST): UTC+2 (CEST)
- Postal code: 16010
- Dialing code: 010
- Website: Official website

Sant'Olcese (Ligurian: Sant'Orçeise) is a comune (municipality) in the Metropolitan City of Genoa in the Italian region of Liguria, located about 6 kilometres (4 mi) north of Genoa. As of 31 December 2004, it had a population of 5,945 and an area of 21.9 square kilometres (8.5 mi^{2}).

The municipality of Sant'Olcese contains the frazioni (subdivisions, mainly villages and hamlets) Manesseno, Comago, Arvigo, Torrazza, Casanova, Trensasco, Piccarello, and Vicomorasso.

At Comago, the Comune holds the Park & c. 1850 Victorian English country house, the Villa Serra.

This house, built by the Marquis F. Orso Serra, an Anglophile, is one of very few Victorian period English country house designs to be found in Italy. The Park is a member of the Great Gardens of Italy Foundation (Grandi Giardini Italiani) and is open to the public.

Sant'Olcese borders the following municipalities: Genoa, Montoggio, Serra Riccò.

== Demographic evolution ==
Historical population

Year	Pop.	±%
1861	3,614	—
1871	3,728	+3.2%
1881	4,062	+9.0%
1901	4,331	+6.6%
1911	4,494	+3.8%

Year	Pop.	±%
1921	4,516	+0.5%
1931	4,877	+8.0%
1936	4,770	−2.2%
1951	5,233	+9.7%
1961	5,127	−2.0%

Year	Pop.	±%
1971	5,513	+7.5%
1981	6,731	+22.1%
1991	6,478	−3.8%
2001	5,983	−7.6%

Source: Data from ISTAT

== Twin towns ==
Sant'Olcese is twinned with:

- Martorelles, Spain (2002)
