= Genova Brignole railway station =

Railway station in Genoa, Italy

Genova Brignole
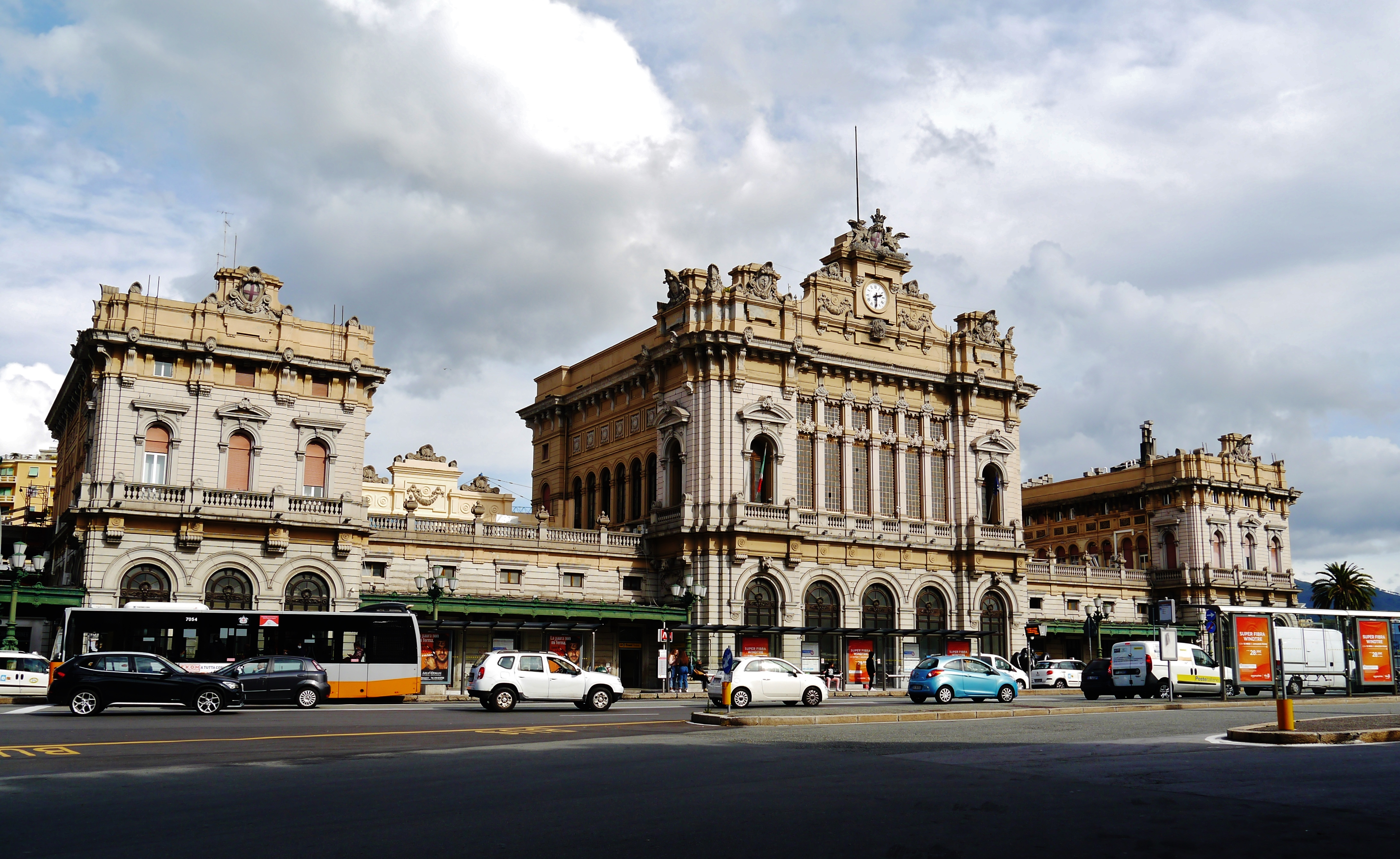
- The 1905 station building

General information
- Location: Piazza Verdi; 16120 Genova; Italy
- Coordinates: 44°24′24″N 08°56′50″E
- Owner: Rete Ferroviaria Italiana
- Operator: Centostazioni
- Lines: (Rome-) Pisa-Genoa; Genoa-Milan; Turin-Genoa; Genoa-Ventimiglia (-France)
- Platforms: 9 pass + 2 freight

Other information
- IATA code: GEP

History
- Opened: 1868
- Rebuilt: 1905
Location
- Location within Liguria Location within Northern Italy Location within Italy

Genova Brignole railway station is the second largest station of Genoa, northern Italy; it is located on Piazza Verdi in the town center at the foot of the Montesano hill (the main long-distance station is Genova Piazza Principe station). Brignole is used by about 60,000 passengers a day and 22,000,000 per year.

== History ==
The first station was built in 1868, but the current building was opened in 1905 for the Genoa international exposition. A project proposal was presented in 1902 by the engineer Giovanni Ottino that provided for a building of 105 metres (344 ft) in length, divided into three buildings on a central axis of symmetry. The building incorporates romantic "renaissance" themes of the French school of architecture, enriched by extensive decorations. The pilaster jambs and frames of the first floor are mostly white. The Roman-style facade, overlooking Piazza Verdi, is decorated with stucco and stone from the quarries of Montorfano. The walls of the rooms inside are decorated with frescoes by De Servi, Berroggio and Grifo.

== Current status ==
The station is on the line to Rome and trains operate from it to Milan, Turin, and the French border at Ventimiglia.

The station is composed of several levels:

- basement: central heating, store rooms and accommodation;
- street level: ticket offices, shops, and Ferrovie dello Stato (FS) offices;
- mezzanine: platform level, occupied by restaurants, waiting room, and local FS offices;
- upstairs: FS headquarters offices and accommodation.

The station has 9 passenger platforms and 2 freight platforms. It is controlled by Grandi Stazioni, a subsidiary of FS, that took over the development of major Italian railway stations.

== Genova Metro ==
The north end of the station was rebuilt and connected with the Genova Metro station, bearing the same name, in 2012. The newly built metro station offers access to the pedestrian walkways from the neighboring area of Borgo Incrociati and shares part of the floor space with the railway station. In 2013 there are still works in progress to repave the tunnels and open new commercial spaces in areas freed by precedent renewals.

== See also ==
- History of rail transport in Italy
- Railway stations in Genoa
- List of railway stations in Liguria
- Railway stations in Italy
