= Casella, Liguria =

Casella
- Comune
- Comune di Casella
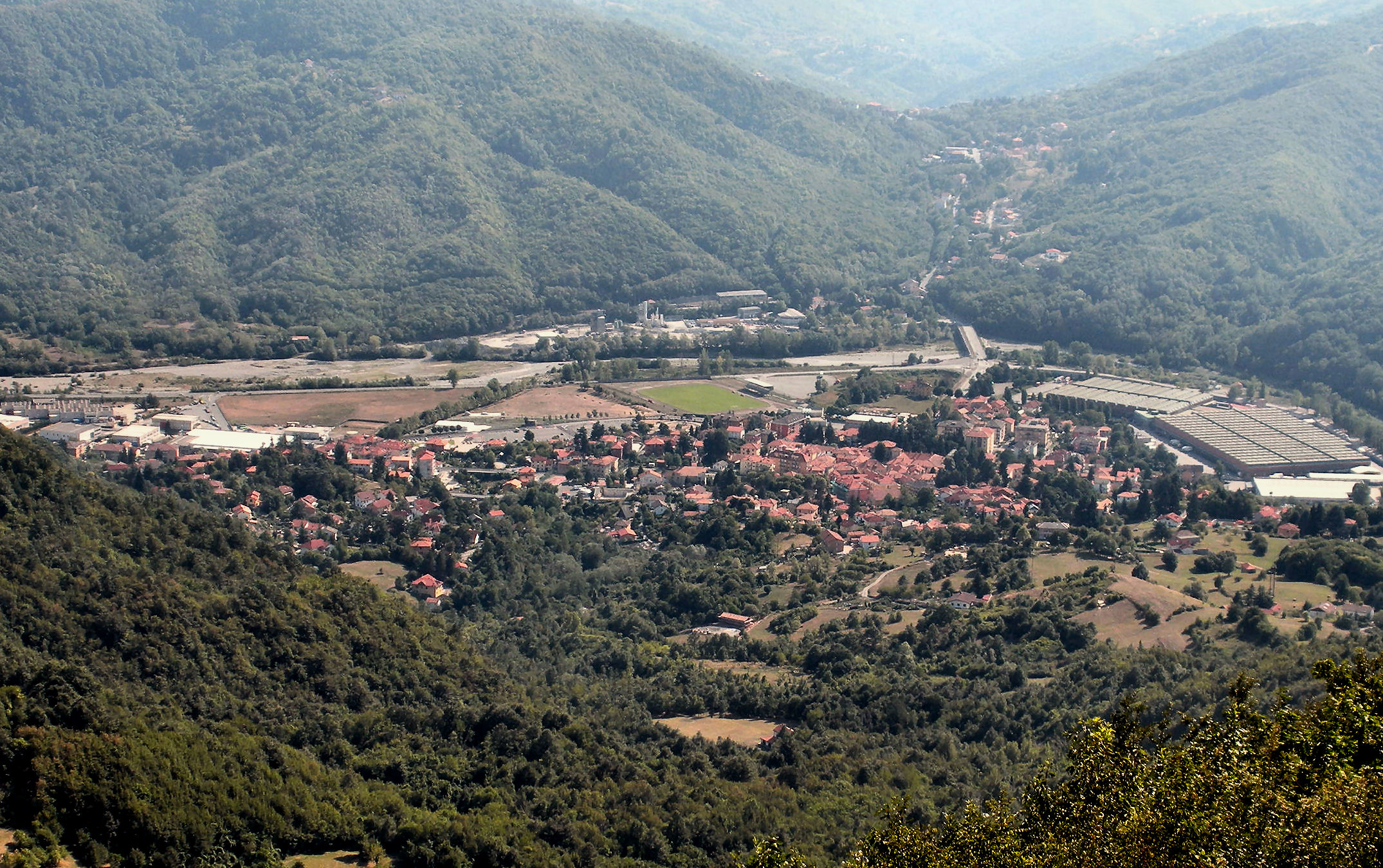
- Casella

- Location within Italy Location within Liguria
- Coordinates: 44°32′N 9°0′E
- Country: Italy
- Region: Liguria
- Metropolitan city: Genoa (GE)
- Frazioni: Carpeneta, Cortino, Crocetta, Parata-Salvega, Stabbio, Stazione

Government
  - Mayor: Gabriele Reggiardo

Area
  - Total: 8.07 km^{2} (3.12 sq mi)
- Elevation: 410 m (1,350 ft)

Population (1-1-2021)
  - Total: 3,109
  - Density: 385/km^{2} (998/sq mi)
- Demonym: Casellese(i)
- Time zone: UTC+1 (CET)
  - Summer (DST): UTC+2 (CEST)
- Postal code: 16015
- Dialing code: 010
- Website: Official website

Casella is a comune (municipality) in the Metropolitan City of Genoa in the Italian region of Liguria, about 14 kilometres (9 mi) northeast of Genoa. As of 31 December 2004 it had a population of 3,131 and an area of 7.8 square kilometres (3.0 mi^{2}).

The municipality of Cassella contains the frazioni (subdivisions, mainly villages and hamlets) of: Carpeneta, Cortino, Crocetta, Parata-Salvega, Stabbio, Stazione.

Casella borders the following municipalities: Montoggio, Savignone, Serra Riccò, Valbrevenna

Casella is the terminus of the Genova–Casella railway.

== Demographic evolution ==
Historical population

Year	Pop.	±%
1861	1,755	—
1871	1,913	+9.0%
1881	1,815	−5.1%
1901	911	−49.8%
1911	1,055	+15.8%

Year	Pop.	±%
1921	1,005	−4.7%
1931	1,095	+9.0%
1936	1,143	+4.4%
1951	1,445	+26.4%
1961	1,338	−7.4%

Year	Pop.	±%
1971	1,733	+29.5%
1981	2,563	+47.9%
1991	2,909	+13.5%
2001	3,060	+5.2%

Source: Data from ISTAT
