= Serra Riccò =

Serra Riccò A Særa
- Comune
- Comune di Serra Riccò
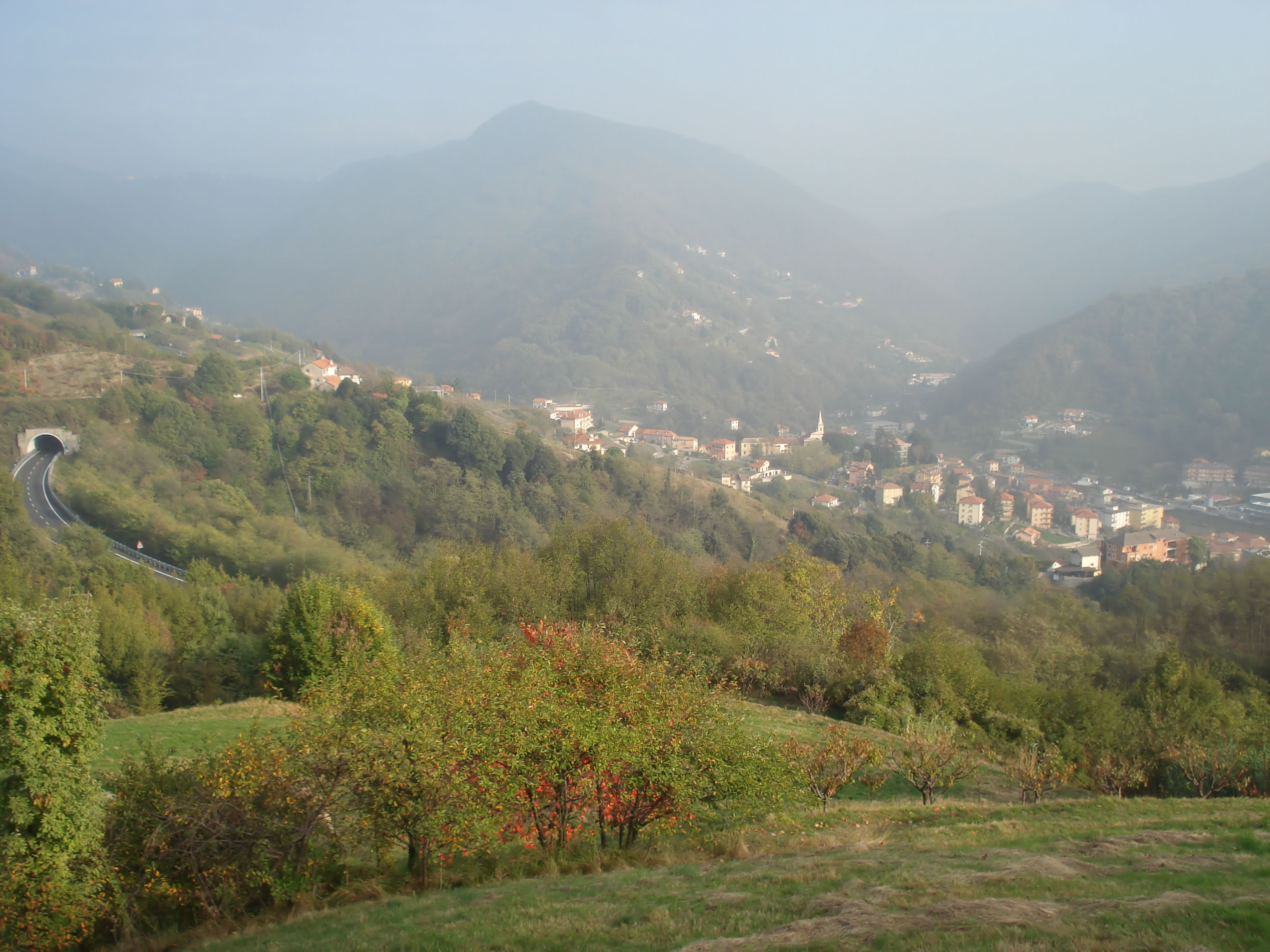
- View of the municipal territory.

- Coat of arms

- Location within Italy Location within Liguria
- Coordinates: 44°30′N 8°56′E
- Country: Italy
- Region: Liguria
- Metropolitan city: Genoa (GE)
- Frazioni: Castagna, Orero, Prelo, Mainetto, Pedemonte (municipal seat), San Cipriano, Serra, Valleregia

Government
  - Mayor: Angela Negri

Area
  - Total: 26.20 km^{2} (10.12 sq mi)
- Elevation: 187 m (614 ft)

Population (1 January 2021)
  - Total: 7,685
  - Density: 293.3/km^{2} (759.7/sq mi)
- Demonym: Serrariccoesi
- Time zone: UTC+1 (CET)
  - Summer (DST): UTC+2 (CEST)
- Postal code: 16010
- Dialing code: 010
- Patron saint: Saint Roch (San Rocco)
- Saint day: 16 August
- Website: Official website

Serra Riccò (Ligurian: A Særa) is a comune (municipality) in the Metropolitan City of Genoa, in the Italian region Liguria, located about 9 kilometres (6 mi) north of Genoa, in the Val Polcevera.

Serra Riccò borders the following municipalities: Casella, Genoa, Mignanego, Montoggio, Sant'Olcese, Savignone. It is composed by a series of villages, the municipal seat being located in Pedemonte.
