= Genova Piazza Principe railway station =

Central railway station of Genoa, Italy

Genova Piazza Principe
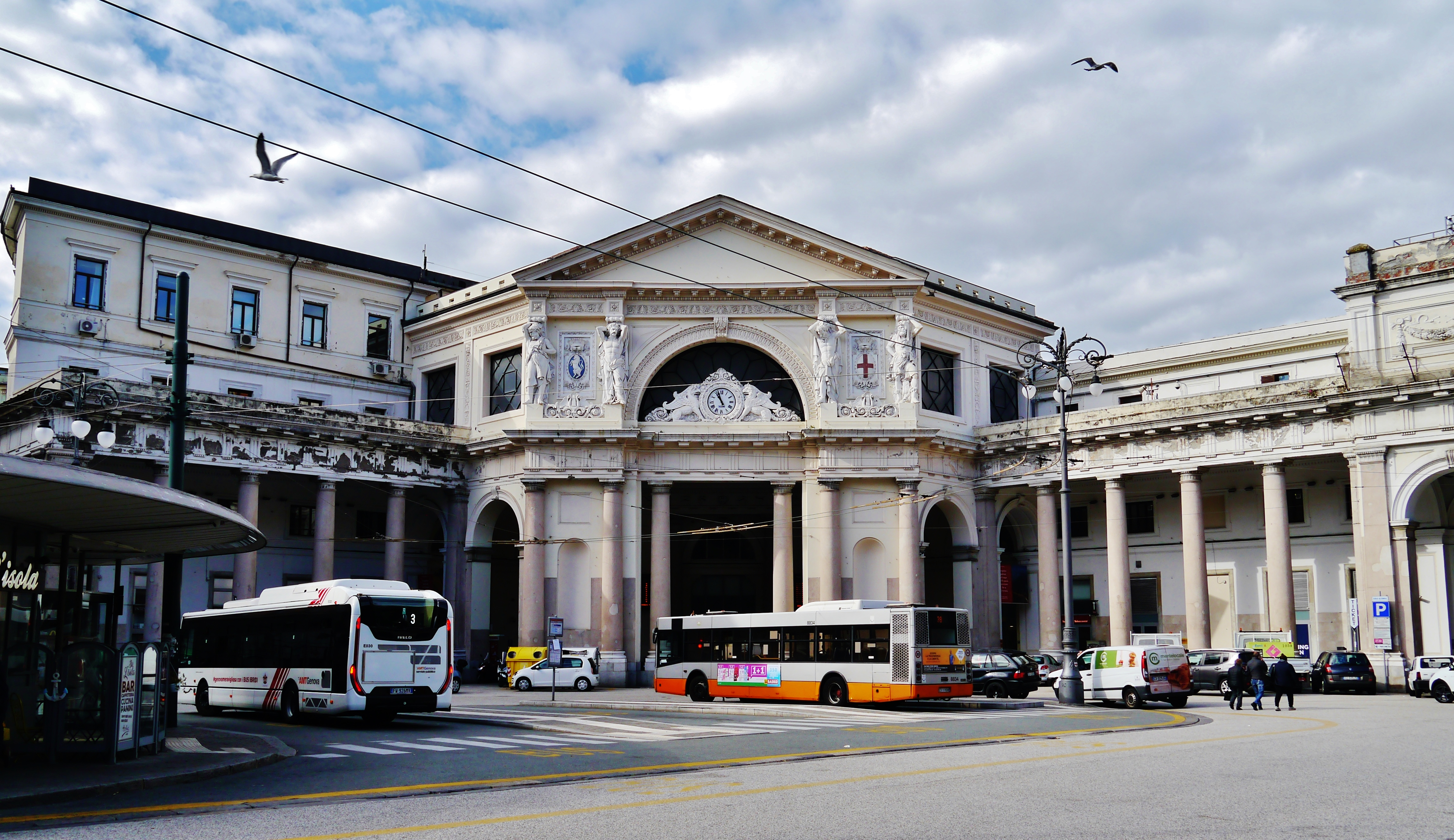
- Exterior of the station building.

General information
- Location: Piazza Acquaverde; 16126 Genova; Italy
- Coordinates: 44°25′00″N 8°55′14″E
- Owner: Rete Ferroviaria Italiana
- Operator: Grandi Stazioni
- Lines: Pisa–Genoa; Genoa–Milan; Turin–Genoa; Genoa–Ventimiglia; Genoa–Acqui Terme
- Platforms: 20

Other information
- IATA code: GPP

History
- Opened: 1860
- Electrified: 1916 (three-phase)
Location
- Location within Liguria Location within Northern Italy Location within Italy

Genova Piazza Principe railway station (commonly called Genova Principe or incorrectly Genova Porta Principe) is the central station of Genoa and is located on Piazza Acquaverde, occupying the entire north side of Via Andrea Doria—where the station entrance is located—in the town centre and a short distance from the Palazzo del Principe, from which it takes its name. It is used by about 66,000 passengers per day and 24,000,000 per year. The first temporary station was opened in 1854 at the end of the line from Turin. Lines were later opened to Milan, Rome and the French border at Ventimiglia.

== History ==
The station derives its name from the adjacent Piazza del Principe (In Italian literally "plaza of the prince"), located next to the Palazzo del Principe (literally "palace of the prince") adjacent to the street called Via Andrea Doria in the Fassolo neighbourhood. The small goods yard, which was the core of the original station, occupies the area between Piazza del Principe, Via Andrea Doria and Piazza Acquaverde, where the main entrance is situated.

Foreigners often call the station Genova Porta Principe, perhaps confused by the names of stations in other cities, such as Milano Porta Garibaldi and Torino Porta Nuova. Note that there was once a gate in the medieval city walls called Porta San Tommaso (and sometimes called Porta Principe) where the steps to the Piazza Principe Metro station are now located and where some remains of the walls can still be seen. It was demolished in the nineteenth century.

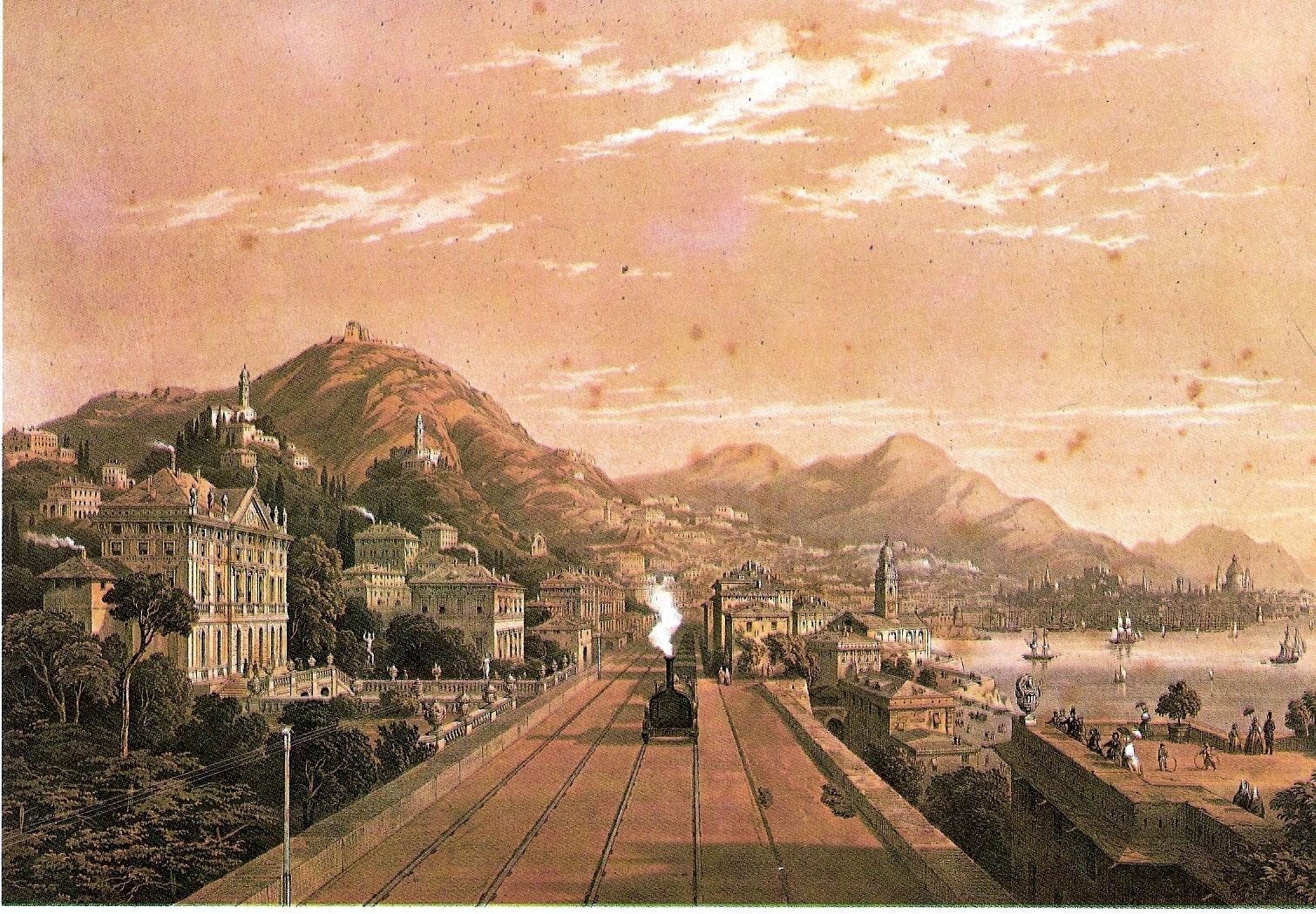
Opening of the Piazza Principe–Sampierdarena section in 1854

The original station was designed by architect Alexander Mazzucchetti and construction began in 1853 and was completed and inaugurated in 1860. The original building had a single-span steel and glass roof, covering ten platforms and buildings for arrivals, departures and transiting passengers. At the time of the official inauguration of the Turin-Genoa railway in February 1854 only a temporary station had been opened.

In 1872, with the opening of the tunnel directly connecting with Brignole station, through platforms were added on the north of the original station. Until the 1960s the terminal platforms were used for passenger trains, mainly for local services to and from the west and north. Since then all passenger trains have operated on the eleven through tracks, while the terminal tracks are now used for the storage of wagons and locomotives.

In 1900, an increase in rail traffic led to the building of an extension of the station to a design by the engineer Giacomo Radini Tedeschi.

On 15 May 1916, the station was electrified at 3,300 V AC three-phase at 15 Hz. It was converted to the current standard of to 3000 volts DC, first on the Genoa–Rome line and later on the Genoa–Milan line. The last to abandon the three-phase system was the Genoa–Turin line between 1962 and 1964. During the Second World War, in common with other Italian railway stations, the roof covering the tracks was dismantled to extract its metal.

In order to handle an increase in metropolitan traffic an underground connection was opened in 1993 between Genoa Brignole and Genoa Sampierdarena, including a new underground station under Genova Piazza Principe with two platforms called Genova Principe Sotterranea. Access to the underground station can be reached either via the escalators in the main station building or from an area located near the Genoa Maritime Terminal (Italian: Stazione marittima di Genova) between the streets of Piazza del Principe, Via Fanti d'Italia and Via Bersaglieri d'Italia, where there is an interchange between rail, bus and metro.

== Today ==
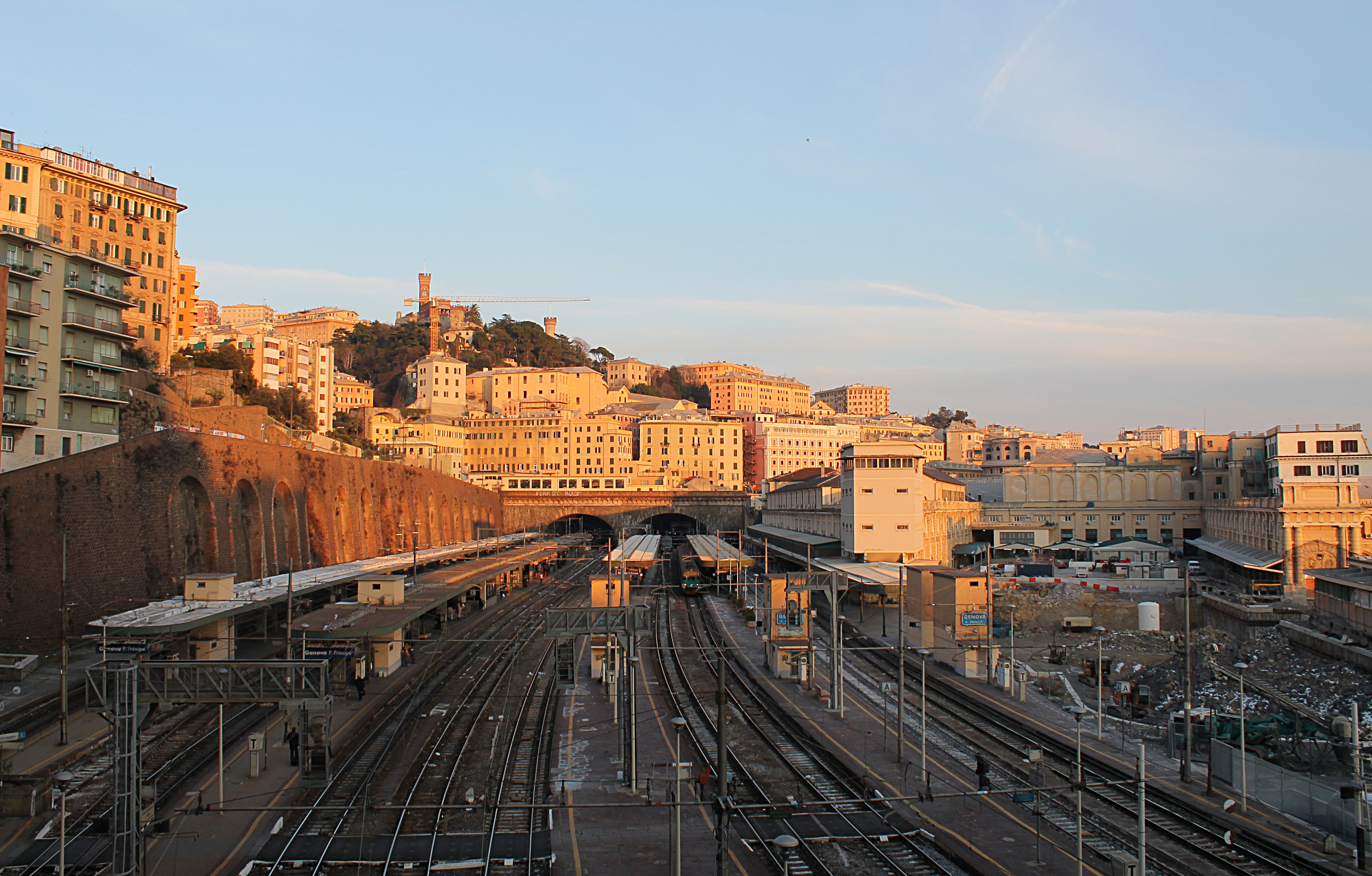
Genova Piazza Principe's platforms

Today the Piazza Principe is on several levels:

- the underground level contains the Ferrovie dello Stato (FS) utility rooms and warehouses and the two suburban rail tracks that form the underground station;
- the platform level is placed below the ground floor and is almost entirely occupied by offices of the FS, utility rooms, warehouses, commercial and catering services;
- the ground floor building contains the main retail businesses and services for passengers;
- the higher levels are fully occupied by offices.

The station is included in the program of rehabilitation of the main Italian stations, being carried out by Grandi Stazioni, a subsidiary of FS.

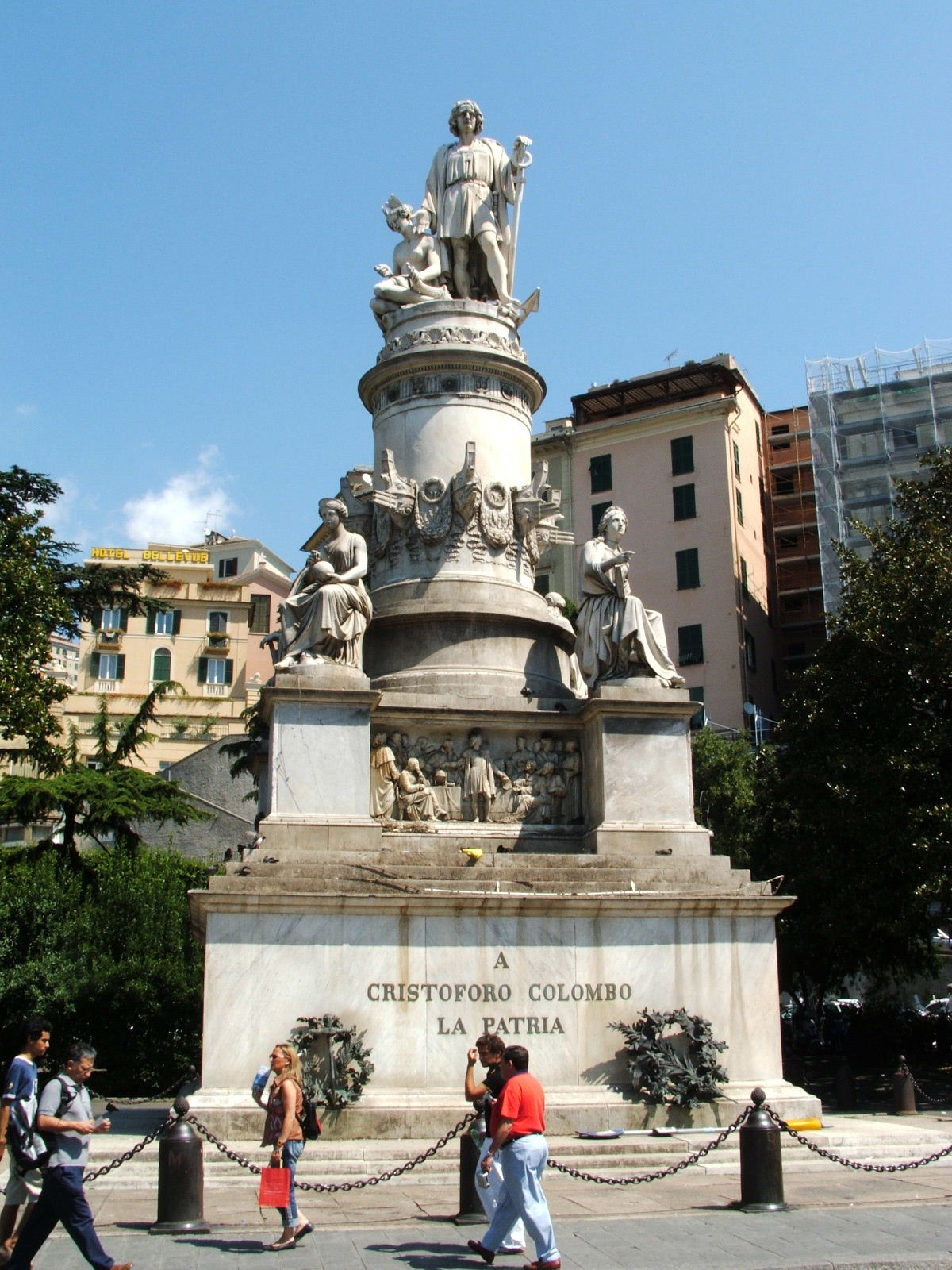
Statue of Christopher Columbus in the garden in front of the station

== Train services ==
The station is served by the following service(s):

- Frecciabianca high speed service from Turin to Roma Termini via La Spezia, Pisa, Livorno.
- Intercity Ventimiglia - Roma
- Treni Regionali Liguriani
- EuroCity services Marseille - Cannes - Nice - Monaco - Ventimiglia - Genoa - Milan
- EuroCity service (SBB) Genoa - Milan - Monza - Lugano - Arth-Goldau - Zurich Main Station

== Interchange ==
Around the station are the termini of several bus lines of the Genoa public transport undertaking (Azienda Mobilità e Trasporti, AMT), the Ferrovia Principe-Granarolo rack railway and the Ascensore Castello d'Albertis-Montegalletto lift and has an hourly bus connection with the airport via the Christopher Columbus Volabus service.

The exit of the Piazza Principe underground station is a few meters from the Principe Station of the Genoa Metro (also managed by AMT) and from the Genoa Maritime Terminal.

== See also ==
- Railway stations in Genoa
- List of railway stations in Liguria
- Railway stations in Italy
