= Genoa–Ventimiglia railway =

Railway line in Italy

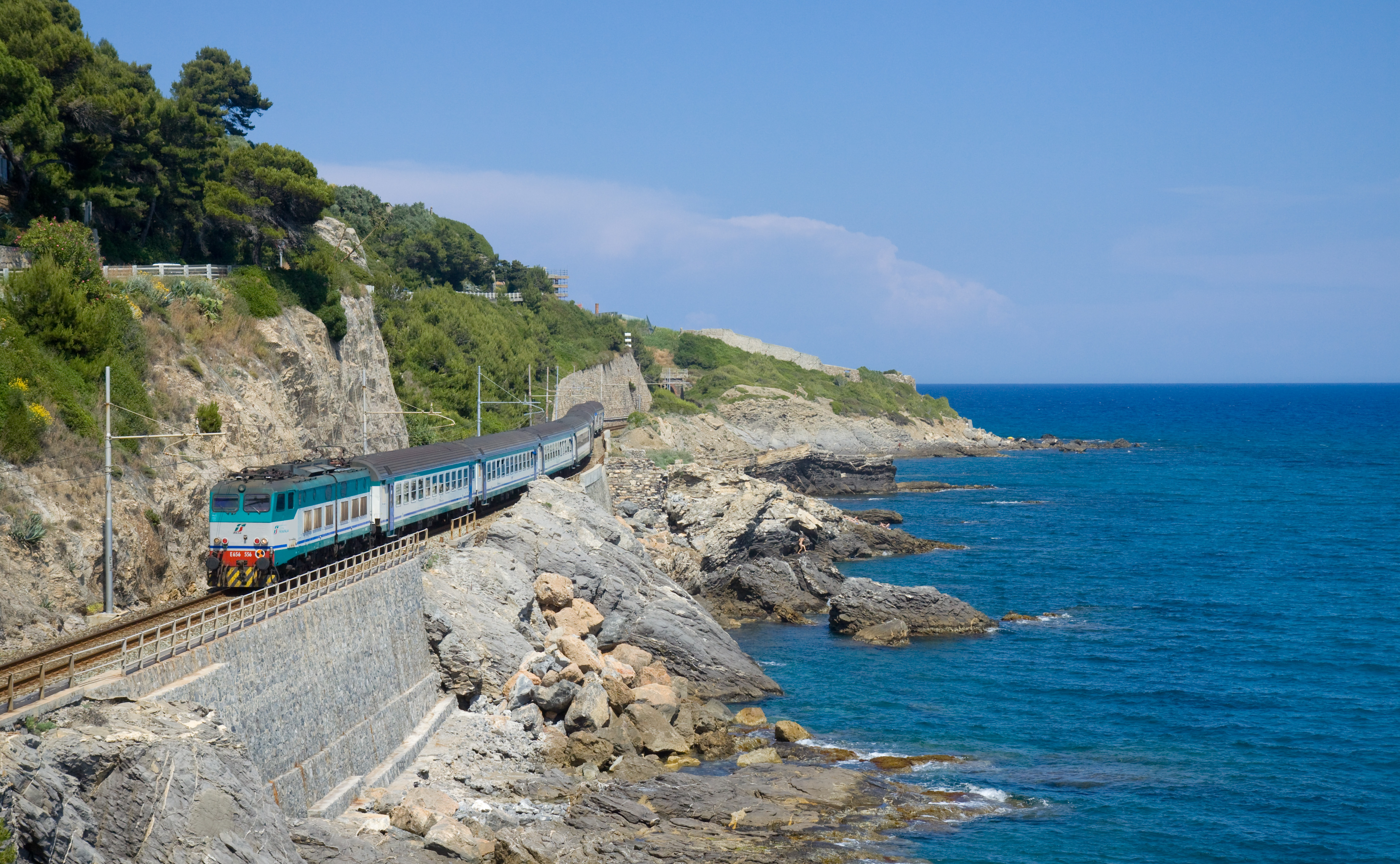
- The line near Cervo

Overview
- Native name: Ferrovia Genova-Ventimiglia
- Owner: Rete Ferroviaria Italiana
- Locale: Liguria, Italy
- Termini: Genova Brignole; Ventimiglia

Service
- Operator(s): Trenitalia

History
- Opened: 25 January 1872

Technical
- Line length: 147 km (91 mi)
- Track gauge: 1,435 mm (4 ft 8 1/2 in) standard gauge

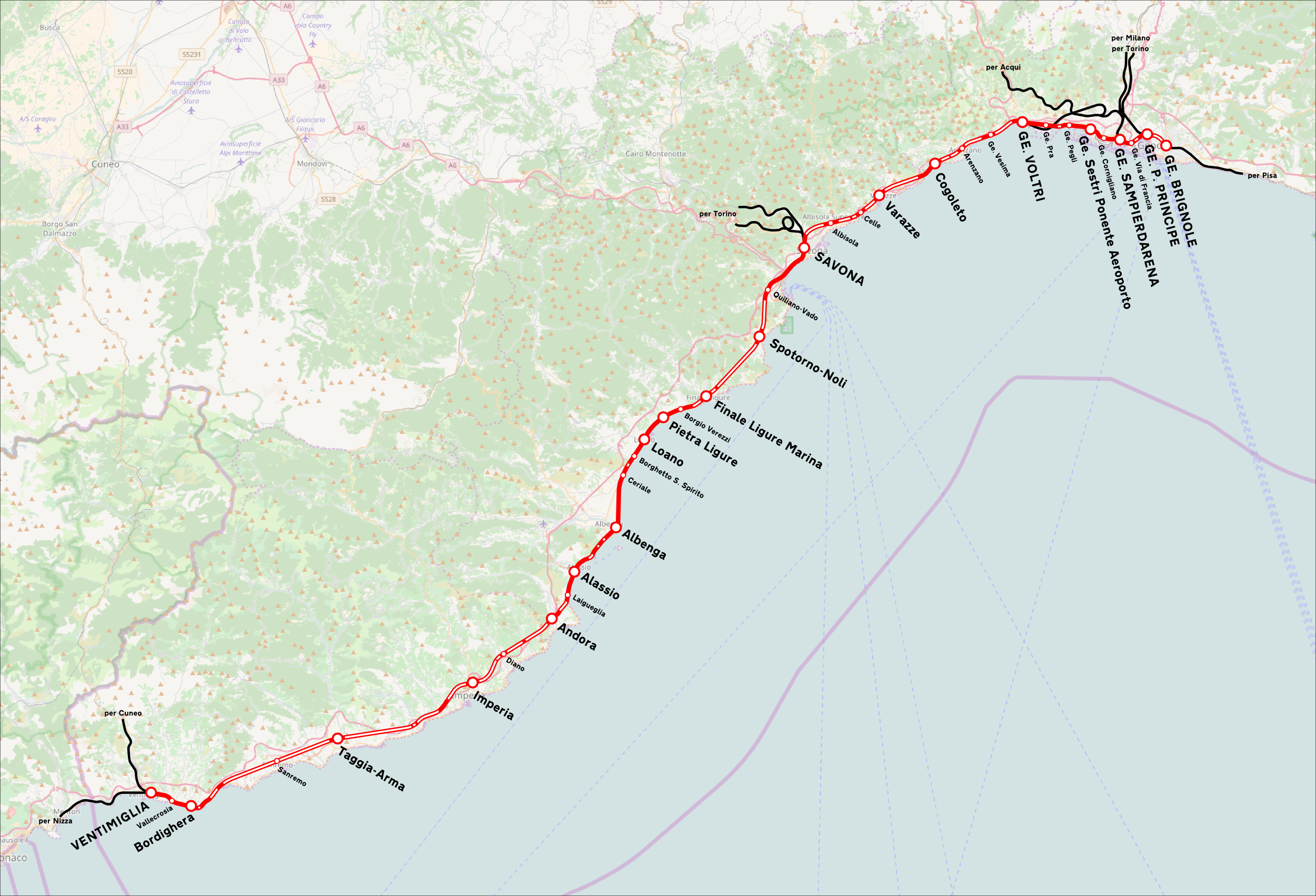
Map

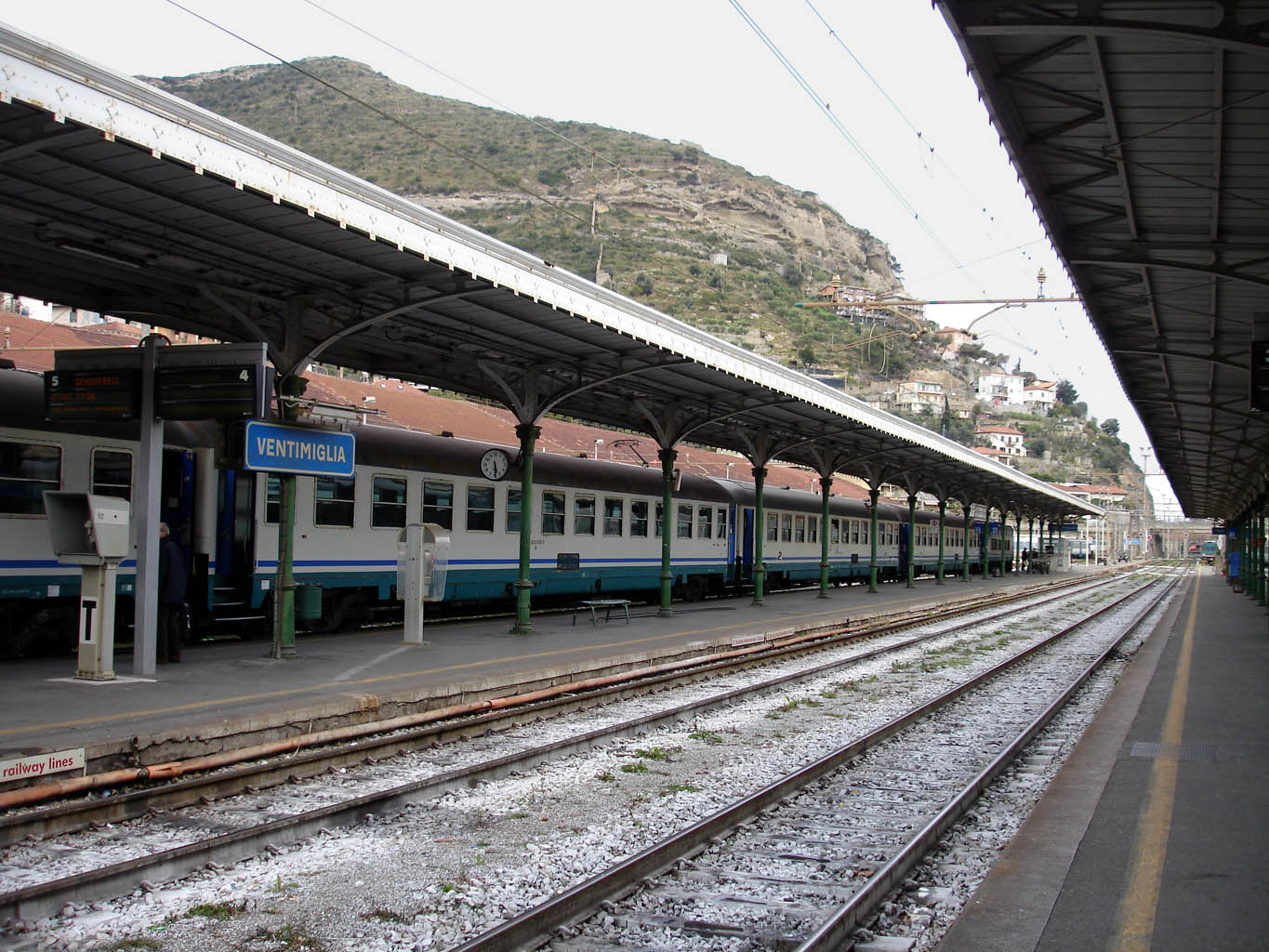
Ventimiglia station

The Genova-Ventimiglia railway runs along the coast of the Liguria region of Italy. It was opened as a single track line between Genova and Savona in 1868, and between Savona and Ventimiglia in 1872, mostly running along a coastal corniche.

A large part of the line was doubled in 2004-2017, mainly by building an entirely new double track line parallel to the old railway, which often ran through towns where space could not be found for a second track. The new line was opened in 2017, and subsequently, the old line was closed. The new line features an increased maximum speed of 180 km/h (110 mph). On the old line, speed had been limited to 100 km/h (60 mph). The line is mainly in tunnels: 61 km (38 mi) of the 74 km (46 mi) of line between Ospedaletti and Finale Ligure is underground, and the rest of the line has similar proportions. The longest tunnel is Caponero-Capoverde (13.135 km (8.162 mi)). This tunnel includes the new Sanremo station. Due to it being mainly in tunnels, the new line does not feature views of the Ligurian coast, making it less attractive for sightseeing.

The final 32 km (20 mi) of the new double track line are in the planning stage (Andora-Finale Ligure) as of 2025.

== History ==
The idea of a railway along the Ligurian coast began in March 1857 with what was called the Railway of the Ligurian Riviera (Italian: Ferrovia delle Riviere Liguri) with the inauguration of a project for a railway from the Var river in Nice—then the border of the Kingdom of Sardinia and France—to the Magra river—which then marked the border Sardinia of and Duchy of Modena. This was part of the ambitious project for the building of a railway system, considered by Cavour as an important part of the process of Italian unification.

A railway was already in operation for a short distance west from Genoa, between the stations of Sampierdarena and Voltri, opened on 8 April 1856, which branched off the Turin–Genoa line. The rapid progress in the creating the Kingdom of Italy gave further impetus to the project leading to the proclamation of a law on 27 October 1860 establishing the Ligurian Railway (Italian: Ferrovia ligure) to run along the coast from Ventimiglia to Massa where it would join an existing railway line. Despite the need to build many tunnels and viaducts this work was carried out quickly and the 29-kilometre (18 mi) extension from Genoa to Savona Letimbro was inaugurated on 25 May 1868. In 1865 the line had been absorbed by the newly established Società per le strade ferrate dell'Alta Italia (Upper Italian Railways). On 25 January 1872, the line was completed to Ventimiglia. The 7-kilometre (4 mi) connection from Ventimiglia to the relocated French border was opened two months later.

In the building of the line, its designers did not pay much attention to the needs of the territory through which it was built but instead mainly took into account military considerations and the political purposes of the new Kingdom of Italy. As most transport in the area, both passenger and freight was mainly carried by sea, the selected route ran virtually at sea level, closely following the coast and, where possible the Via Aurelia, linking more than 40 villages that had previously been difficult to reach by land. In 1885, the line was integrated into the new Società per le Strade Ferrate del Mediterraneo (Mediterranean System), which was taken over by the Ferrovie dello Stato in 1905.

== Doubling ==
Due to the difficulty of building the line and in order to minimise costs, the line was built almost entirely as a single track. This soon proved inadequate for its traffic. In the early twentieth century work began on designing improvements to the line, but duplication work proceeded very slowly, so much so that some sections between Imperia and Finale Ligure are still single track. Almost all doubling has involved the construction of new largely underground line, with the abandonment of the old line.

Sections doubled by 1969 were:

- Genova Sampierdarena – Voltri 11 km (7 mi)
- Loano – Albenga 8 km (5 mi)
- Ospedaletti – French border 20 km (12 mi)

The first part of the doubling, between the station of Genova Voltri and Varazze, was opened in 1970. The new line was moved inland compared to the old route, removed to railway from the coastal towns of Arenzano, Cogoleto and Varazze. A new station was built in Arenzano.

The old railway line was partly re-used and partly abandoned. In particular in the area of Vesima, after years of abandonment, the route of the old line was used for the widening of the roadway of the Via Aurelia within the three towns. The suburban sections were originally abandoned but have been recovered in recent years to be used as pedestrian paths.

In 1977, the new section between Finale Ligure and Varazze was completed very late compared with the original program; it included the new station of Savona Mongrifone. The abandoned line was absorbed by the urban fabric, with much of it converted into a promenade.

In Savona the old station was left abandoned for a long while. The new station, built between 1961 and 1962 to the design of the engineer Pier Luigi Nervi, was opened by President Antonio Segni.

After 25 years of planning, public discussion and construction the new double line between Imperia and Bordighera, opened in 2001, including new stations in Arma di Taggia and Sanremo, while San Lorenzo, Santo Stefano and Ospedaletti lost their stations.

On 2 April 2005 a deviation of the line between Voltri and Pegli was opened, including the building of a new station of Genova Prà in replacement of the original one built in 1856, transferred to City Municipality for non railway purposes. The new station of Pra' due to its huge parking place is nowadays one of the busiest and most utilized stations in Genova. the old railway area in the territory of Prà has been utilized to build a new road and promenade, reconnecting the city with its littoral and sea, within a European Union co-financed project named "P.O.R. - Pra' Marina".

A new section of double track has been built between San Lorenzo al Mare and Andora, diverting the line inland via a series of new tunnels and viaducts. It replaced the old coastal route and includes new stations at Andora, Diano and Imperia that replaced older stations, including two former stations in Imperia. This new section was scheduled for completion at the end of 2009, but was delayed. Work on the section of line through Imperia ground to a halt in 2011, and after the resolution of legal disputes between the main contractors, construction recommenced in February 2014. The new section was opened at the 2016 winter timetable change.

The last section to be double-tracked, between Andora and Finale Ligure, is currently in the planning stage. The section is 32 kilometres (20 mi) long, of which 25 km (16 mi) will be in tunnels. The completion is scheduled for 2029.

== See also ==
- List of railway lines in Italy
