= List of municipalities of the Metropolitan City of Genoa =

The following is a list of the 67 municipalities (comuni) of the Metropolitan City of Genoa in the region of Liguria in Italy.

== List ==
Municipality	Population (2026)	Area (km²)	Density
Arenzano	11,134	24.30	458.2
Avegno	2,533	10.93	231.7
Bargagli	2,478	16.28	152.2
Bogliasco	4,249	4.42	961.3
Borzonasca	1,831	80.51	22.7
Busalla	5,110	17.06	299.5
Camogli	4,798	10.07	476.5
Campo Ligure	2,821	23.74	118.8
Campomorone	6,432	25.91	248.2
Carasco	3,707	8.46	438.2
Casarza Ligure	6,729	27.82	241.9
Casella	3,049	8.07	377.8
Castiglione Chiavarese	1,531	29.75	51.5
Ceranesi	3,584	30.70	116.7
Chiavari	27,435	12.23	2,243.3
Cicagna	2,339	11.28	207.4
Cogoleto	8,249	20.72	398.1
Cogorno	5,692	9.08	626.9
Coreglia Ligure	241	8.00	30.1
Crocefieschi	546	11.73	46.5
Davagna	1,772	20.53	86.3
Fascia	65	11.25	5.8
Favale di Malvaro	421	16.62	25.3
Fontanigorda	226	16.16	14.0
Genoa	566,247	240.29	2,356.5
Gorreto	84	18.88	4.4
Isola del Cantone	1,425	47.97	29.7
Lavagna	12,411	13.88	894.2
Leivi	2,447	9.71	252.0
Lorsica	377	17.72	21.3
Lumarzo	1,437	25.51	56.3
Masone	3,314	29.44	112.6
Mele	2,511	16.93	148.3
Mezzanego	1,563	28.65	54.6
Mignanego	3,542	16.27	217.7
Moconesi	2,423	16.27	148.9
Moneglia	2,490	15.61	159.5
Montebruno	199	17.68	11.3
Montoggio	2,020	47.73	42.3
Ne	2,126	63.52	33.5
Neirone	890	30.24	29.4
Orero	504	15.99	31.5
Pieve Ligure	2,352	3.56	660.7
Portofino	359	2.53	141.9
Propata	119	16.93	7.0
Rapallo	29,595	33.61	880.5
Recco	9,273	9.77	949.1
Rezzoaglio	859	104.72	8.2
Ronco Scrivia	4,213	30.11	139.9
Rondanina	57	12.81	4.4
Rossiglione	2,523	47.59	53.0
Rovegno	469	44.09	10.6
San Colombano Certenoli	2,697	41.58	64.9
Sant'Olcese	5,563	21.90	254.0
Santa Margherita Ligure	8,259	10.04	822.6
Santo Stefano d'Aveto	964	54.78	17.6
Savignone	3,000	21.74	138.0
Serra Riccò	7,573	26.20	289.0
Sestri Levante	17,088	33.62	508.3
Sori	3,893	13.07	297.9
Tiglieto	476	24.54	19.4
Torriglia	2,236	60.02	37.3
Tribogna	599	7.14	83.9
Uscio	2,118	9.63	219.9
Valbrevenna	754	34.67	21.7
Vobbia	365	33.43	10.9
Zoagli	2,305	7.79	295.9

== See also ==
- List of municipalities of Italy
