= List of parishes of the Roman Catholic Archdiocese of Genoa =

Archdiocese of Genoa parish list

List of parishes by province and commune for the Roman Catholic Archdiocese of Genoa.

== Liguria ==
=== Province of Genoa ===
Arenzano
Santi Nazario e Celso
Avegno
S. Pietro Apostolo
S. Antonio Abate (Salto Chiesa)
S. Margherita Vergine e Martire (Testana)
S. Lorenzo (Vescina Vecchia)
Bargagli
S. Maria Assunta
Visitazione di Maria SS. (Cisiano)
S. Giovanni Battista (Terrusso)
S. Ambrogio (Traso)
S. Siro (Viganego)
Bogliasco
Natività di Maria SS.
S. Bernardo di Favaro
Ascensione di Nostro Signore Gesù Cristo e Nostra Signora della Neve (Sessarego)
Busalla
S. Giorgio
Camogli
S. Maria Assunta
S. Michele Arcangelo (Ruta)
S. Fruttuoso di Capodimonte (San Fruttuoso di Camogli)
S. Rocco (San Rocco di Camogli)
Campomorone
S. Bernardo Abate
S. Bartolomeo (Cravasco)
S. Michele Arcangelo (Gallaneto)
S. Rocco (Gazzolo)
S. Andrea Apostolo (Isoverde)
S. Siro (Langasco)
S. Stefano (Larvego)
Ascensione di Nostro Signore (Pietralavezzara)
Carasco
S. Andrea Apostolo di Morego (San Quirico)
Ceranesi
S. Bartolomeo
S. Lorenzo di Torbi
S. Maria Assunta
S. Martino (Chiesa di Paravanico)
SS. Nome di Gesù (Geo)
Davagna
S. Pietro Apostolo
S. Stefano
S. Andrea Apostolo (Calvari)
S. Giovanni Battista (Marsiglia)
S. Colombano Abate (Moranego)
Genoa
Diecimila Martiri Crocifissi
Gesù Adolescente
Maria SS. della Misericordia e S.Fede
Mater Ecclesiae
Natività di Maria SS. di Quezzi
Nostra Signora Assunta e S.Zita
Nostra Signora degli Angeli
Nostra Signora del Carmine e S.Agnese
Nostra Signora del Rimedio
Nostra Signora del Rosario
Nostra Signora della Consolazione e S. Vincenzo Martire
Nostra Signora della Guardia di Quezzi
Nostra Signora della Misericordia e S.Giovanni Battista
Nostra Signora della Provvidenza
Nostra Signora delle Grazie e S.Gerolamo
Nostra Signora di Loreto di Oregina
Nostra Signora di Lourdes e S.Bernardo
Regina Pacis
Risurrezione di Nostro Signore Gesù Cristo
S. Antonio in Boccadasse
S. Bartolomeo Apostolo di Staglieno
S. Caterina of Genoa
S. Cuore e S. Giacomo di Carignano
S. Desiderio
S. Donato
S. Eusebio
S. Famiglia
S. Fruttuoso
S. Gerolamo dell’Istituto G.Gaslini
S. Gerolamo di Quarto
S. Giacomo Maggiore di Molassana
S. Giorgio di Bavari
S. Giovanni Battista
S. Giovanni Evangelista di Prè
S. Giuseppe Al Lagaccio
S. Giuseppe Benedetto Cottolengo
S. Giuseppe di Priaruggia
S. Gottardo
S. Lorenzo
S. Lorenzo di Premanico
S. Luca
S. Marcellino
S. Marco Al Molo
S. Margherita di Marassi
S. Maria Assunta di Carignano
S. Maria Assunta di Molassana
S. Maria Dei Servi
S. Maria della Castagna
S. Maria delle Nasche
S. Maria delle Vigne
S. Maria di Castello
S. Maria di Granarolo
S. Maria Immacolata
S. Maria Immacolata
S. Maria Immacolata e S.Torpete
S. Maria in Apparizione
S. Maria Maddalena e S.Gerolamo Emiliani
S. Martino d’Albaro
S. Matteo Apostolo ed Evangelista
S. Michele Arcangelo di Montesignano
S. Nicola Da Tolentino
S. Pancrazio
S. Paolo
S. Pietro
S. Pietro Apostolo
S. Pietro Apostolo di Fontanegli
S. Pietro Apostolo e S.Teresa del Bambino Gesù
S. Pietro di Cremeno
S. Pio X
S. Rocco di Molassana
S. Rocco di Vernazza
S. Rocco Sopra Principe
S. Sabina
S. Siro
S. Sisto Ii P. M. e Natività di Maria SS.
S. Stefano
S. Teodoro
S. Tommaso Apostolo e S.Leone
Santi Angeli Custodi
Santi Cosma e Damiano
Santi Nazario e Celso e S. Francesco d’Albaro
Santi Pietro e Bernardo Alla Foce
Santi Pietro e Paolo
Santi Vittore e Carlo
SS. Annunziata del Chiappeto
SS. Annunziata del Vastato
SS. Annunziata di Sturla
SS. Redentore
SS. Sacramento e S.Antonino
SS. Salvatore e S.Croce
SS. Trinità e S. Benedetto Al Porto
Tabernacolo
Nostra Signora della Neve (Bolzaneto)
S. Francesco Alla Chiappetta (Bolzaneto)
S. Martino di Murta (Bolzaneto)
S. Pietro Apostolo di Cremeno (Bolzaneto)
S. Stefano in Geminiano (Bolzaneto)
Nostra Signora di Lourdes in Campi (Cornigliano Ligure)
S. Giacomo Apostolo (Cornigliano Ligure)
Santi Andrea e Ambrogio (Cornigliano Ligure)
Nostra Signora della Mercede e S.Erasmo (Nervi)
S. Giuseppe e Padre Santo (Nervi)
S. Ilario (Nervi)
S. Maria Assunta (Nervi)
S. Siro (Nervi)
Nostra Signora Assunta e S.Nicola Da Tolentino in Chiesino (Pegli)
S. Antonio Abate (Pegli)
S. Carlo di Cese (Pegli)
S. Francesco d’Assisi (Pegli)
S. Maria e Santi Nazario e Celso in Multedo (Pegli)
S. Maria Immacolata e S.Marziano (Pegli)
Santi Martino e Benedetto (Pegli)
S. Antonino Martire in Cesino (Pontedecimo)
S. Giacomo Maggiore (Pontedecimo)
S. Giovanni Bosco della Rimessa (Pontedecimo)
Maria Madre del Buon Consiglio (Prà)
Nostra Signora del Soccorso e S.Rocco (Prà)
S. Maria Assunta (Prà)
Nostra Signora dell’Aiuto di Trasta (Rivarolo Ligure)
S. Ambrogio di Fegino (Rivarolo Ligure)
S. Anna di Teglia (Rivarolo Ligure)
S. Bartolomeo della Certosa (Rivarolo Ligure)
S. Caterina Vergine e Martire in Begato (Rivarolo Ligure)
S. Croce e Maria Ausiliatrice (Rivarolo Ligure)
S. Giovanni Battista della Costa di Rivarolo (Rivarolo Ligure)
S. Maria Assunta (Rivarolo Ligure)
S. Maria del Garbo in Polcevera (Rivarolo Ligure)
SS. Nome di Gesù (Rivarolo Ligure)
Cristo Re (Sampierdarena)
Natività di Maria SS. (Sampierdarena)
Nostra Signora del SS.Sacramento (Sampierdarena)
S. Bartolomeo Apostolo di Promontorio (Sampierdarena)
S. Bartolomeo del Fossato (Sampierdarena)
S. Giovanni Bosco e S.Gaetano (Sampierdarena)
S. Maria della Cella e S.Martino (Sampierdarena)
S. Maria della Vittoria (Sampierdarena)
S. Maria delle Grazie (Sampierdarena)
Sacro Cuore di Gesù Al Campasso (Sampierdarena)
S. Biagio (San Quirico in Val Polcevera)
S. Maria Assunta del Serro (San Quirico in Val Polcevera)
Santi Quirico e Giulitta (San Quirico in Val Polcevera)
Natività di Maria SS. e S.Nicola Da Tolentino (Sestri Ponente)
Natività di Nostro Signore Gesù Cristo (Sestri Ponente)
Nostra Signora Assunta (Sestri Ponente)
Nostra Signora della Misericordia e S.Lorenzo Martire in Borzoli (Sestri Ponente)
S. Famiglia e S.Giorgio (Sestri Ponente)
S. Francesco d’Assisi (Sestri Ponente)
S. Giovanni Battista (Sestri Ponente)
S. Pietro Ai Prati (Sestri Ponente)
S. Stefano di Borzoli (Sestri Ponente)
Spirito Santo (Sestri Ponente)
SS. Annunziata della Costra (Sestri Ponente)
Nostra Signora di Lourdes e S.Giuseppe di Prato (Struppa)
S. Giovanni Battista in Aggio (Struppa)
S. Martino di Struppa (Struppa)
S. Siro di Struppa (Struppa)
Santi Cosma e Damiano di Struppa (Struppa)
Nostra Signora degli Angeli (Voltri)
Nostra Signora della Misericordia e S.Bernardo (Voltri)
S. Ambrogio (Voltri)
S. Bartolomeo delle Fabbriche (Voltri)
S. Eugenio in Crevari (Voltri)
S. Lorenzo in Chiale (Voltri)
S. Michele di Fiorino (Voltri)
Santi Nicolò ed Erasmo (Voltri)
Isola del Cantone
S. Michele Arcangelo
Mele
S. Antonio Abate
S. Giacomo Maggiore (Fado Alto)
Mignanego
S. Ambrogio
S. Bambino Gesù e S.Giuseppe (Barriera)
S. Fruttuoso (Fumeri)
Ascensione di Nostro Signore Gesù Cristo (Giovi)
S. Andrea (Montanesi)
S. Maria Assunta (Paveto)
Montoggio
S. Giovanni Battista Decollato
Pieve Ligure
S. Michele Arcangelo
Recco
Nostra Signora delle Grazie
S. Giovanni Battista
S. Rocco
S. Martino (Polanesi)
Ronco Scrivia
S. Martino Vescovo
S. Maria Assunta (Borgo Fornari)
Sant’Olcese
S. Margherita
S. Olcese
S. Maria Assunta (Comago)
S. Martino (Manesseno)
Nostra Signora del Rosario di Pompei e S.Bernardo (Torrazza)
Santi Rocco e Sebastiano (Trensasco)
Savignone
S. Giuseppe di Isorelle (Ponte di Savignone)
S. Bartolomeo di Vallecalda (San Bartolomeo)
Serra Riccò
S. Maria Assunta
Nostra Signora della Mercede (Mainetto)
S. Lorenzo (Orero di Serra Riccò)
SS. Annunziata (Pedemonte)
Santi Cornelio e Cipriano (San Cipriano Chiesa)
Natività di Maria SS. (Valleregia di Serra Riccò)
Sori
S. Bartolomeo Apostolo
S. Margherita Vergine e Martire
S. Maria Assunta (Canepa)
S. Pietro Apostolo (Capreno)
S. Apollinare (Sant’Apollinare)
S. Maria Immacolata (Sussisa)
S. Lorenzo (Teriasca)
Tribogna
S. Martino
Cristo Re e Maria SS.Immacolata (Cassanesi)
S. Francesco d’Assisi (Piandeipreti)
Uscio
S. Ambrogio
Nostra Signora di Caravaggio (Calcinara)
S. Cuore di Gesù e S.Rocco (Terrile)
Valbrevenna
S. Maria delle Grazie (Carsi)
S. Michele Arcangelo (Clavarezza)
SS. Nome di Maria (Frassinello)
S. Lorenzo (Pareto)
S. Maria Assunta (Senarega)
Vobbia
S. Maria delle Grazie
Nostra Signora della Neve e S.Gaetano (Alpe)
Santi Cosma e Damiano (Arezzo)
Natività di Maria SS. (Noceto di Vobbia)
S. Antonio di Salata (Salata)
S. Maria Assunta (Vallenzona)

== Piedmont ==
=== Province of Alessandria ===
Arquata Scrivia
S. Andrea Apostolo (Rigoroso)
S. Nicolò di Bari (Sottovalle)
Bosio
Santi Pietro e Marziano
S. Croce (Capanne di Marcarolo)
S. Stefano (Costa Santo Stefano)
Carrosio
S. Maria Assunta
Fraconalto
Santi Bernardo Abate e Lorenzo Martire (Castagnola di Fraconalto)
Nostra Signora della Misericordia (Molini)
S. Pietro Apostolo (Tegli)
Gavi
S. Giacomo Maggiore
Santi Antonio Abate e Fermo Martire (Alice)
Santi Cosma e Damiano (Monterotondo)
Nostra Signora della Neve (Pratolungo)
Nostra Signora Consolata (Rovereto)
Mongiardino Ligure
S. Ruffino (Cerendero)
S. Giovanni Battista (Maggiolo)
S. Pietro Apostolo (Vergagni)
Parodi Ligure
Santi Rocco e Sebastiano
Santi Remigio e Carlo (Cadepiaggio)
S. Maria di Tramontana (Tramontana)
Voltaggio
S. Maria Assunta e Santi Nazario e Celso
