= Gênes =

Former French department in Italy (1805–1814)

Département de Gênes
- department of the First French Empire
- 1805–1815
- Location of Gênes in France (1812)
- Capital: Genoa
- Area
  - Coordinates: 44°24′N 8°55′E
  - 1812: 2,376 km^{2} (917 sq mi)
- Population
  - 1812: 400,056
- History
  - Annexion from the Ligurian Republic: 4 June 1805
  - Congress of Vienna: 1815
- Political subdivisions: 5 arrondissements
Preceded by	Succeeded by
Ligurian Republic	Kingdom of Sardinia

Gênes (French pronunciation: [ʒɛn]) was a department of the First French Empire in present-day Italy. It was named after the city of Genoa. It was formed in 1805, when the Ligurian Republic (formerly the Republic of Genoa) was annexed directly to France. Its capital was Genoa.

The department was disbanded after the defeat of Napoleon in 1814. It was followed by a brief restoration of the Ligurian Republic, but at the Congress of Vienna the old territory of Genoa was awarded to the Kingdom of Sardinia. Its territory is now divided between the Italian provinces of Genoa, Piacenza, Alessandria and Pavia.

== Subdivisions ==
Coat of arms of the city of Genoa under the French Empire

The department was subdivided into the following arrondissements and cantons (situation in 1812):

- Genoa, cantons: Genoa (6 cantons), Rivarolo, Nervi, Recco, San Martino d'Albaro, San Quirico, Sestri Ponente, Staglieno, Torriglia and Voltri.
- Bobbio, cantons: Bobbio, Ottone, Varzi and Zavattarello.
- Novi, cantons: Novi, Gavi, Ovada, Rocchetta, Ronco, Savignone and Serravalle.
- Tortona, cantons: Tortona, Cassano Spinola, Castelnuovo Scrivia, San Sebastiano, Villalvernia and Volpedo.
- Voghera, cantons: Voghera, Argine, Broni, Casteggio, Codevilla, Sale, Silvano, Soriasco and Stradella.

Its population in 1812 was 400,056, and its area was 237,600 hectares.
