= Monte Reale =

Mountain in Italy

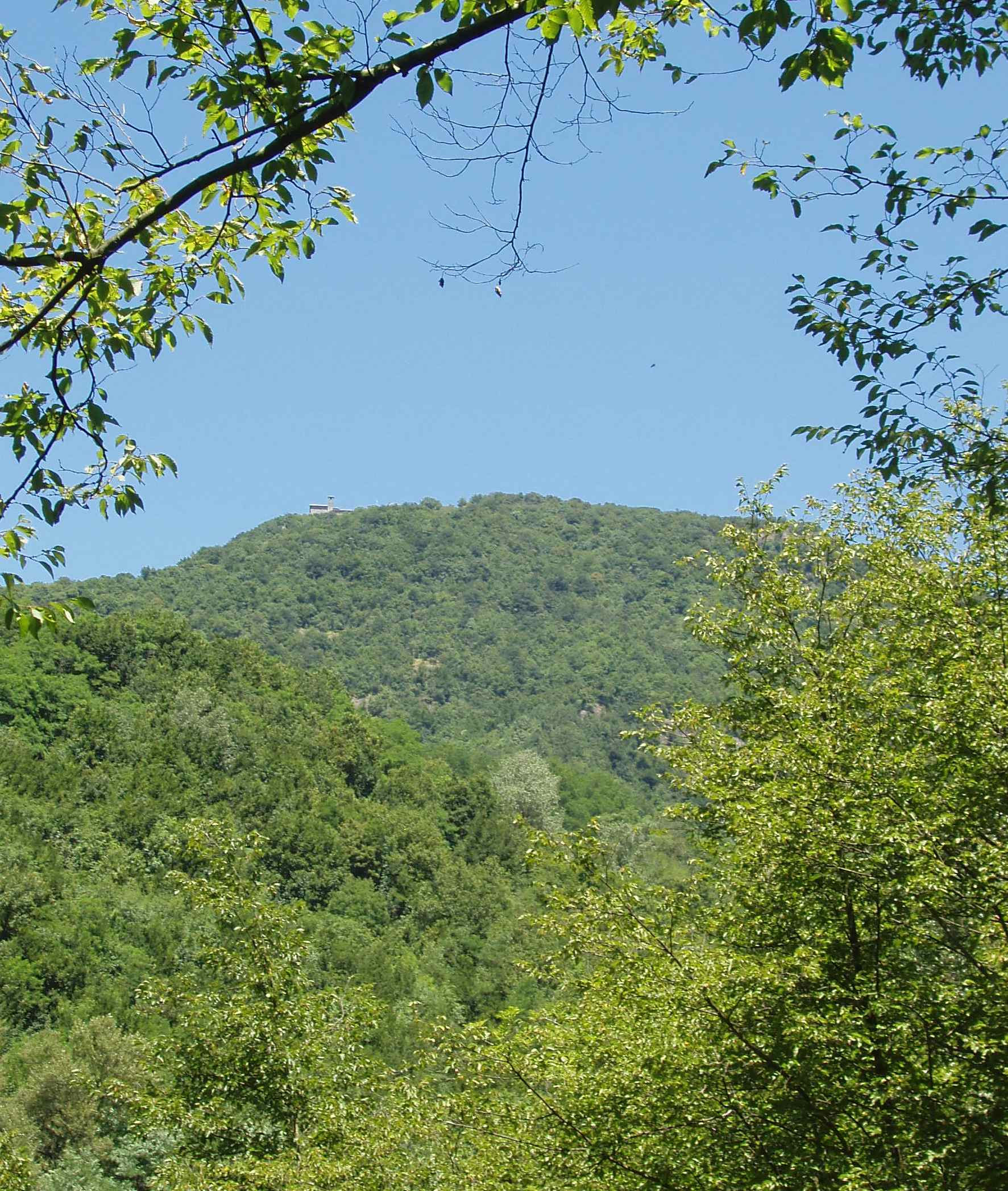
- Mount Reale seen from Bric dell'Aiuola

Highest point
- Elevation: 902 m (2,959 ft)
- Prominence: 242 m (794 ft)
- Coordinates: 44°37′33″N 8°58′10″E

Geography
- Location within Italy
- Location: Liguria, Italy
- Parent range: Ligurian Apennines

Climbing
- Easiest route: hiking

Monte Reale is a mountain of the Ligurian Apennines. It is located in the Province of Genoa along the watershed between the basin of the Scrivia Torrent and that of the Vobbia, its tributary to the right. It is situated in the more western part of the Regional Natural Park of Antola between the municipal territories of Ronco Scrivia and Isola del Cantone.

== Description and historical notes ==
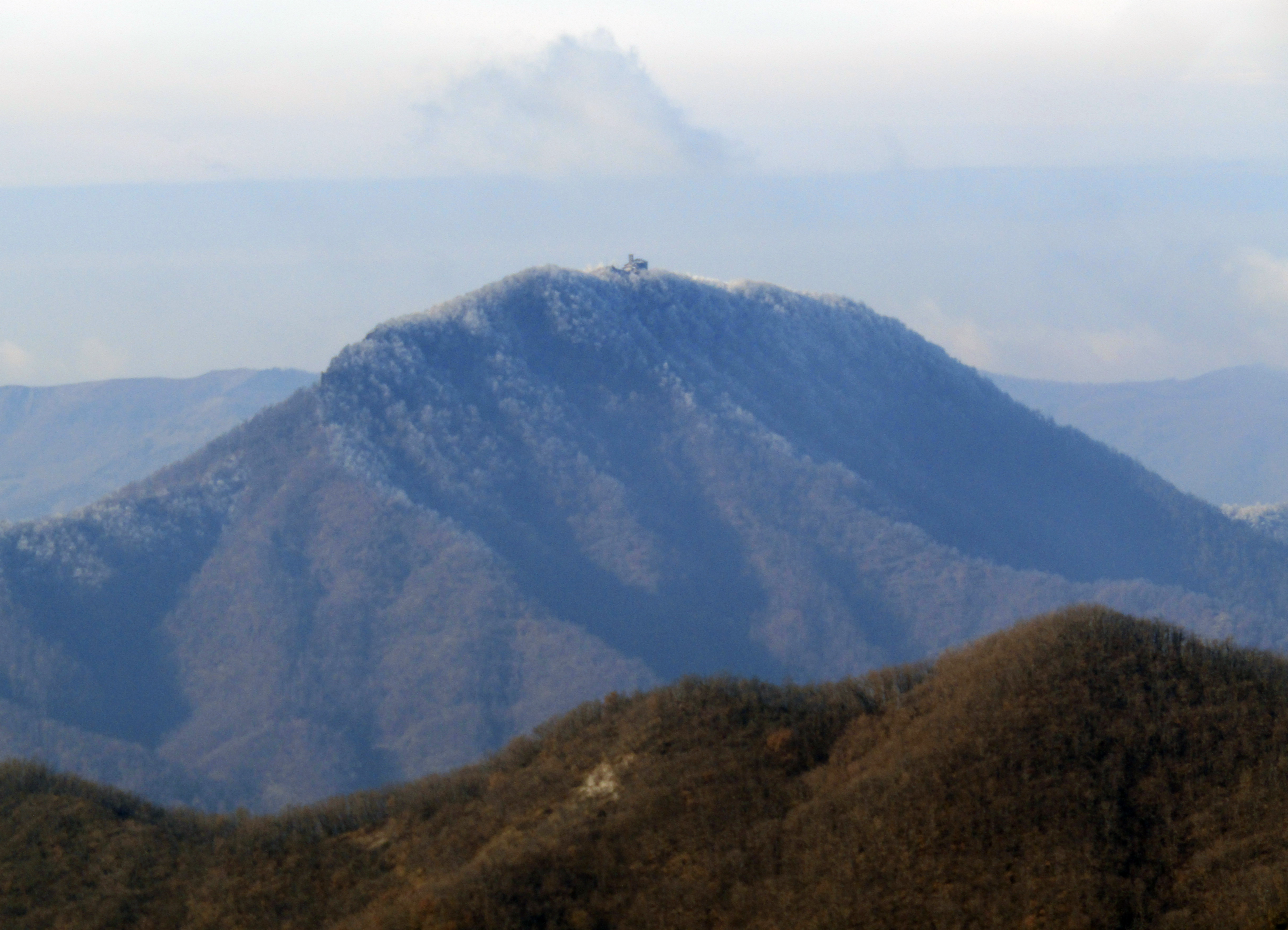
Autumn view of the mountain from Caprieto

The summit of the mountain during the Middle Ages was occupied by a castle, which has almost totally vanished today. In its place is now found a sanctuary dedicated to the Madonna of Loreto, built between 1858 and 1868. Attached to the religious structure there is a small shelter present, which is always open and equipped with 8 bed stations. A rural cableway on the Scrivia side it utilized in case of the need to transport materials. Its relatively modest altitude notwithstanding, Monte Reale is, thanks to its isolated position and distance from taller mountains, an exceptional panoramic point. On clear days, the range may be observed from the forts of Genoa to the Maritime Alps and from Monte Rosa to the Adamello, and it may be seen as far as Corsica.

== Hiking ==
Monte Reale may be easily accessed from Ronco Scrivia by following an itinerary which, departing from the railway station, transits through the hamlet of Cascine. Another path instead follows the Vobbia-Scrivia watershed departing from the small center of Minceto.

A free mountain hut all-year open is located next to the church.

== Conservation ==
The mountain since 1989 is included in the Parco naturale regionale dell'Antola.
