= Antola Natural Regional Park =

- Parco naturale regionale dell'Antola
- IUCN category V (protected landscape/seascape)
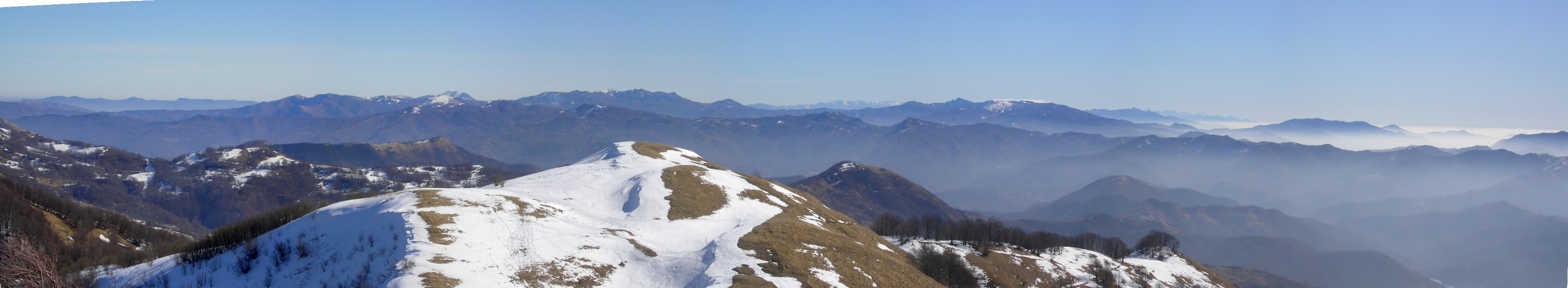
- Winter panorama from Monte Antola

- Location within Italy
- Location: Metropolitan City of Genoa, Italy
- Nearest city: Genova
- Coordinates: 44°34′26″N 9°08′56″E
- Area: 4,837 ha (11,950 acres)
- Established: 1989, 1995
- Governing body: Ente Parco dell'Antola (Torriglia)
- Website: www.parcoantola.it

The Antola Natural Regional Park (in Italian Parco naturale regionale dell'Antola) is a natural park in Metropolitan City of Genoa (Liguria, Italy). It gets the name from the highest mountain of the area, Monte Antola.

== History ==
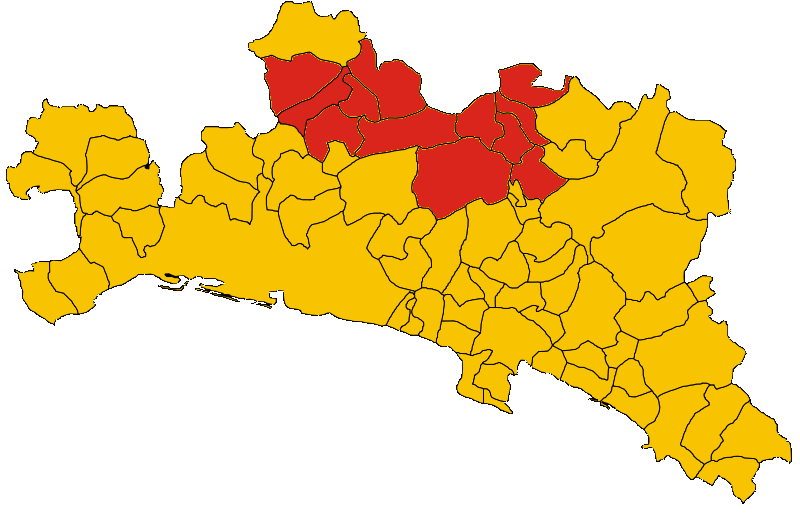
Municipalities of the park (in red)

The natural park was established by the l.r. (regional law, in Italian legge regionale) nr. 16, April 9, 1985 as modified by the l.r. nr. 12, February 22, 1995. Since April 30, 2014 the Environmental Management System of the park is certified according to ISO 14001 standards.

== Geography ==
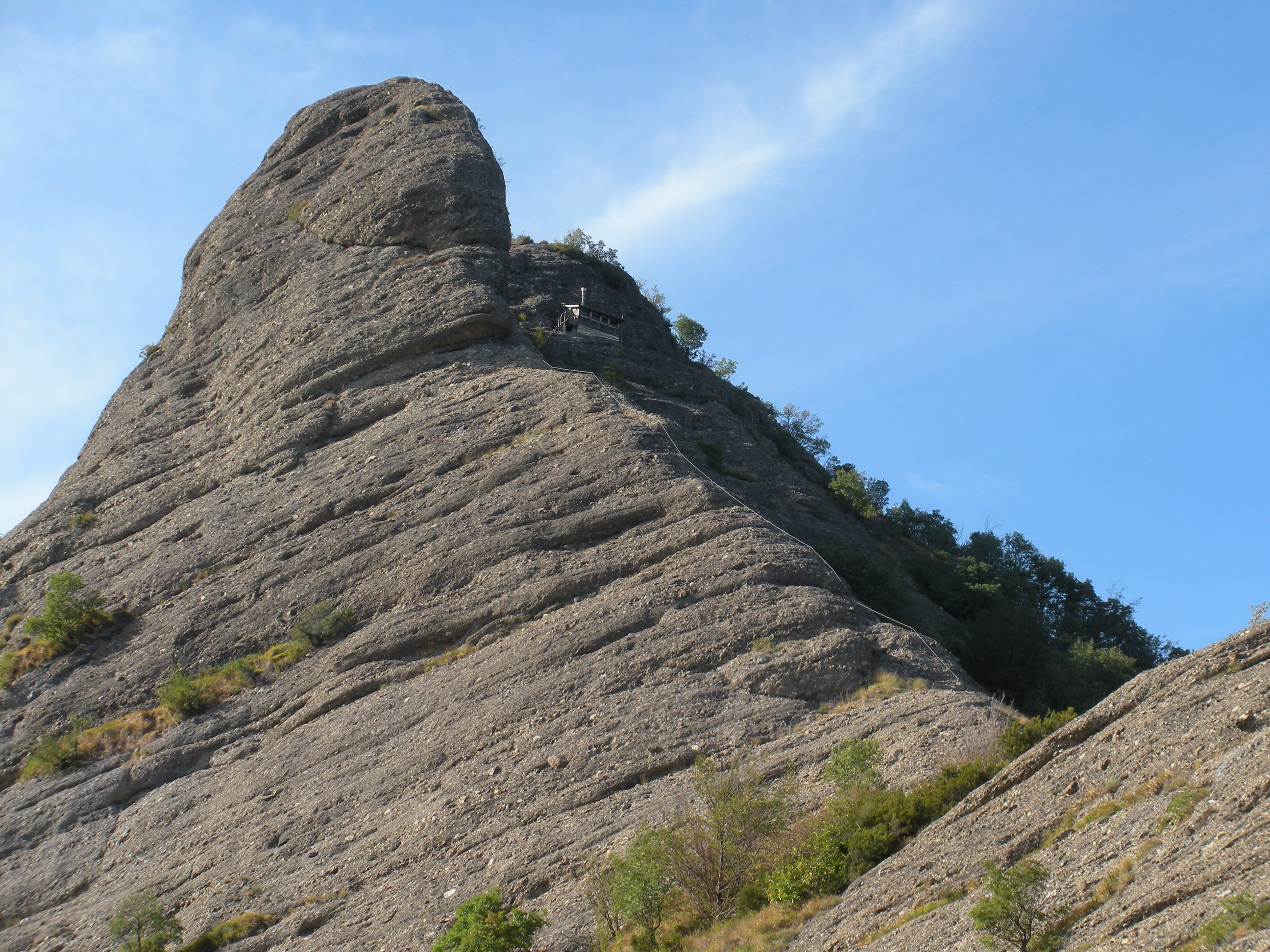
Biurca, Rocche del Reopasso.

Situated in the inland of the Italian Riviera between Genova and Rapallo, the park protects a scenic portion of the Ligurian Apennines. The protected area is mainly located near the border with Piemonte and south of the Apenninic watershed dividing Pianura Padana (tributary of the Adriatic Sea) from the Ligurian Sea drainage basin. It covers over 48 square kilometres (that is 4,837 ha (11,950 acres)), plus 5,832 ha under a lesser form of environmental protection named aree contigue (contiguous areas).

The park encompasses the uppermost part of four short valleys:

- Val Vobbia
- Val Pentemina
- Val Brevenna
- Val Trebbia.

=== Concerned municipalities ===
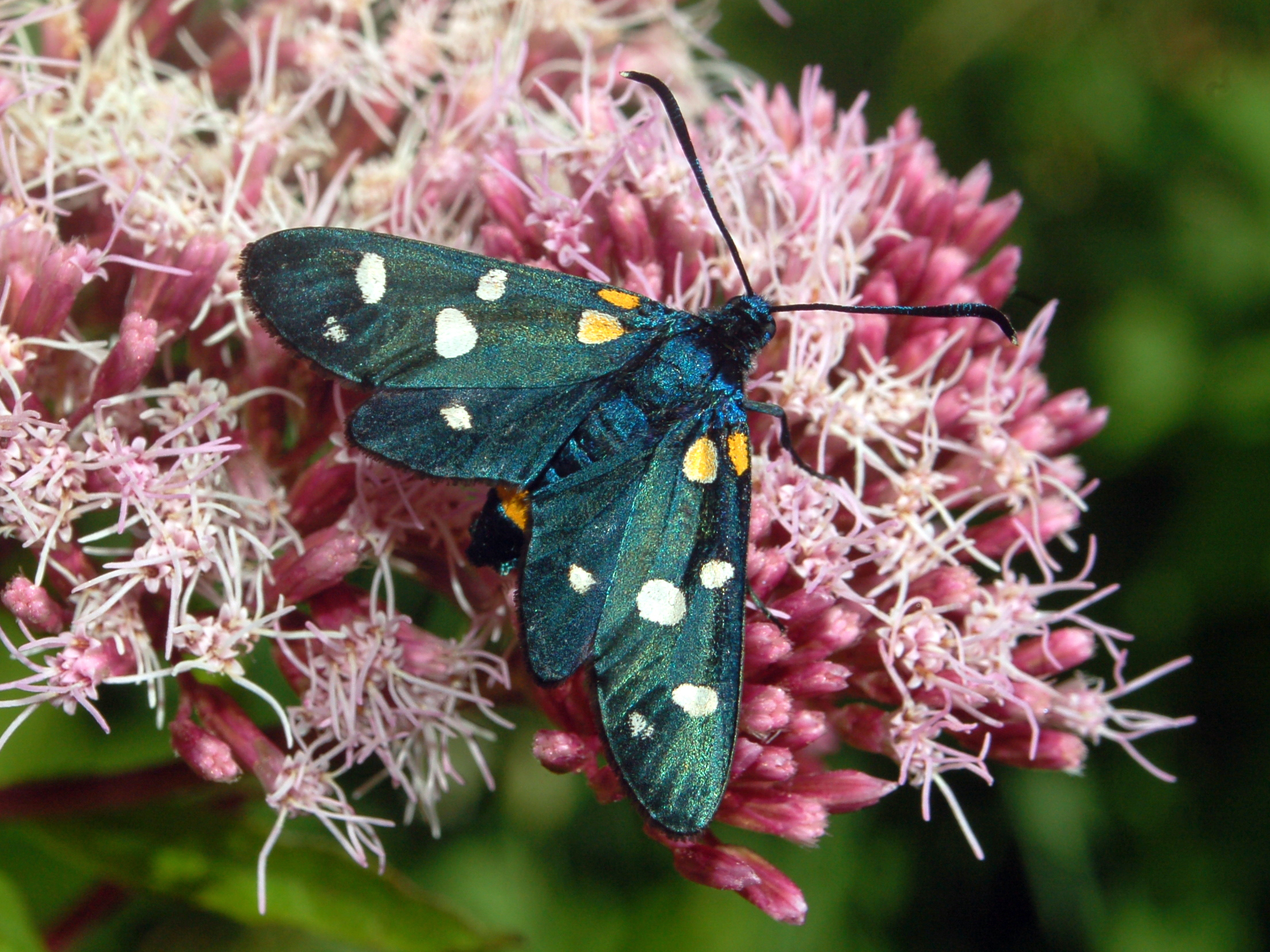
Zygaena ephialtes, a common moth in the Antola area

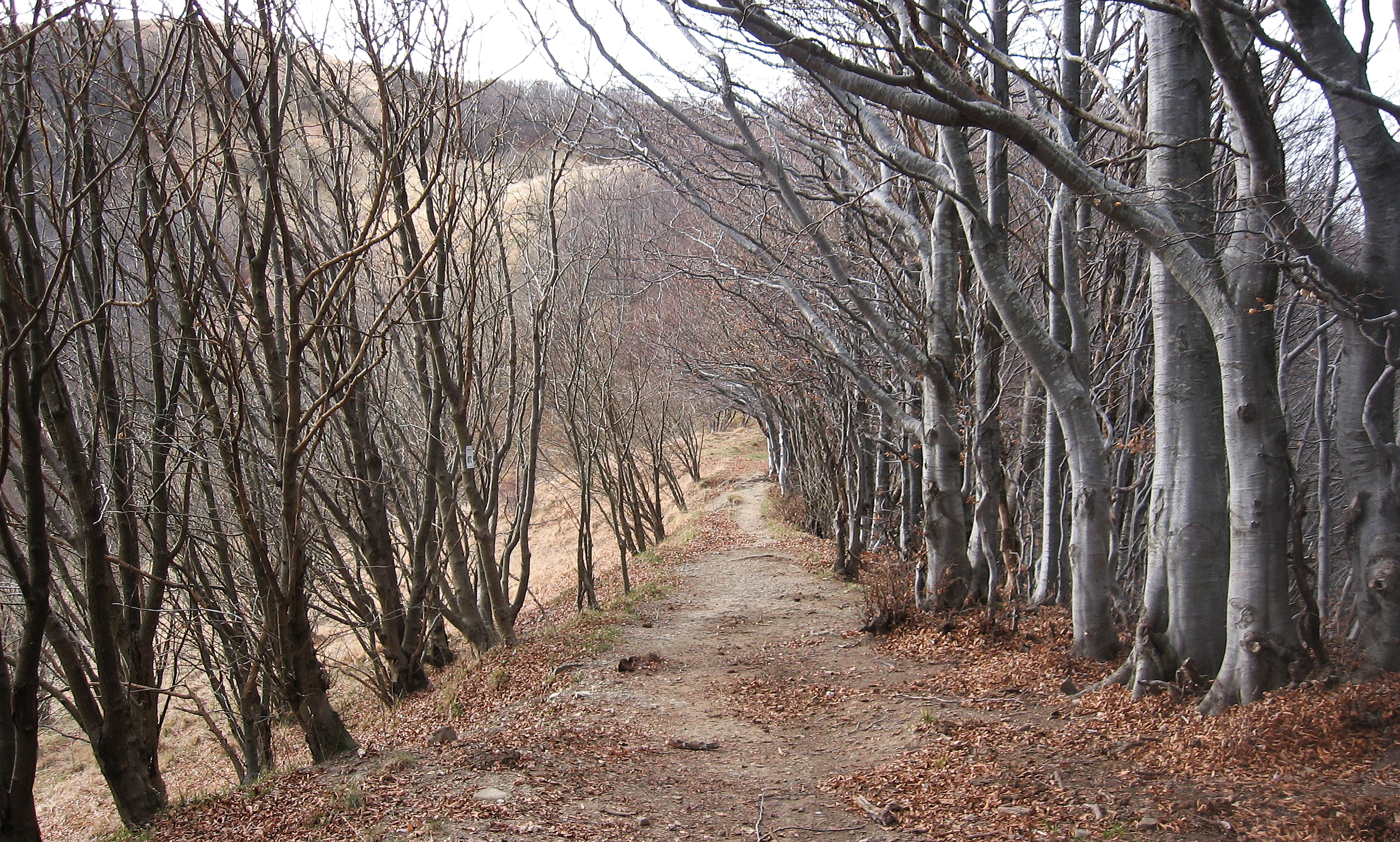
Beech trees near Monte Antola.

The natural park is shared among twelve different municipalities: Busalla, Crocefieschi, Fascia, Gorreto, Montebruno, Propata, Ronco Scrivia, Rondanina, Savignone, Torriglia, Valbrevenna, Vobbia.

=== Main summits of the park ===
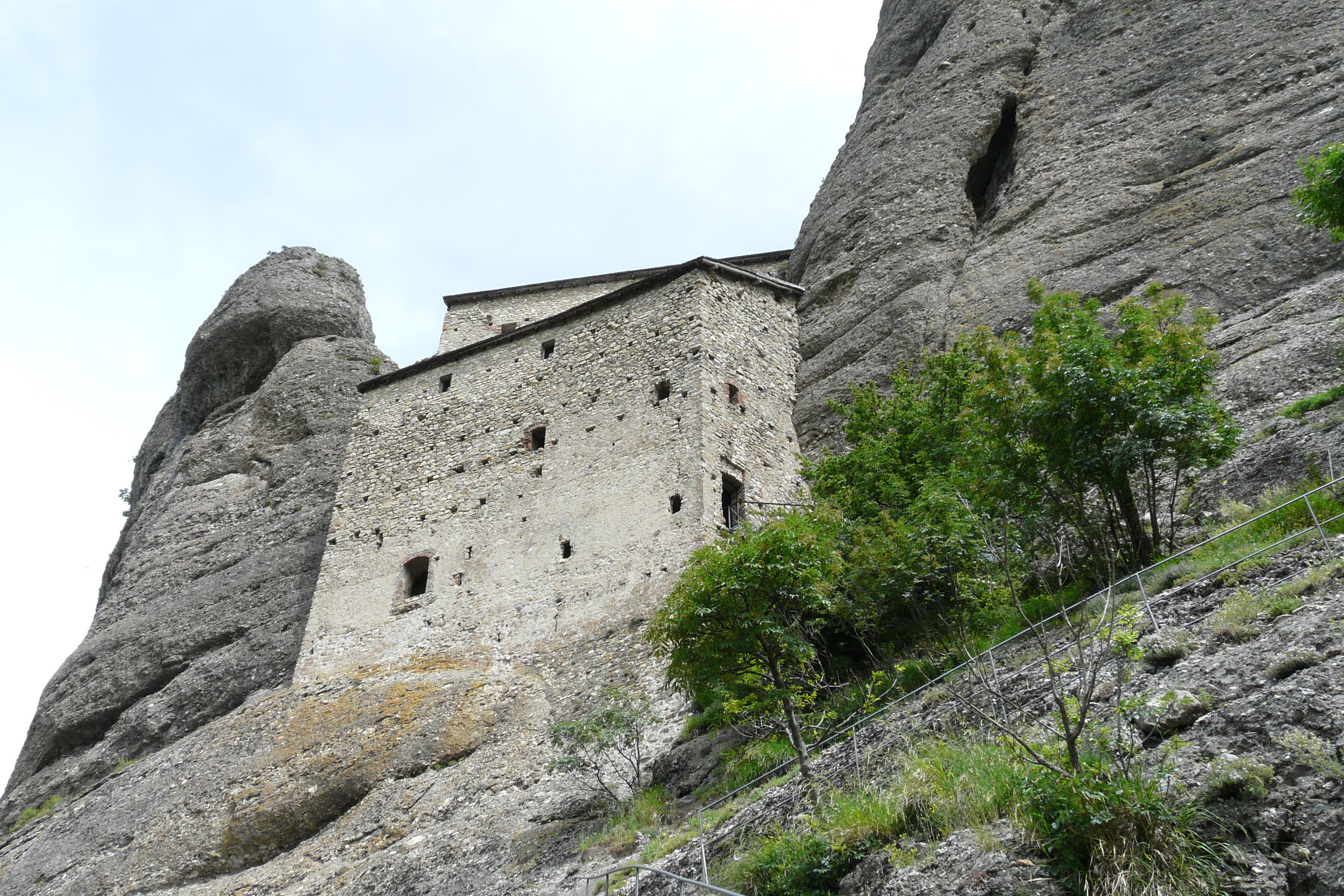
Castello della Pietra (lit. castle of the stone), an ancient castle of the park located not faraway from Vobbia.

Among the highest summits located in the park can be cited Monte Antola (1597 m), Monte Buio (1,497 m) and Monte Prelà (1406 m). Also relevant for some aspects are Rocche del Reopasso (956 m), a rocky summit with interesting climbing routes and a via ferrata, or Monte Reale (902 m), bearing an old Catholic sanctuary on its top and a free mountain hut all-year open next to the church.

== Wildlife ==
The most renowned among the animal species living in the park are wolves, that became extinct in the area around 1850 because of the increased number of inhabitants of that period. They reappeared around 150 years later coming from the central Apennine at the end of the 20th century, and are now an habitual presence in the protected area. They mostly prey on roe and fallow deer, which have also reappeared in the park in the last decades. Birds of prey are well represented by Buteo buteo, Accipiter nisus, Falco tinnunculus and Pernis apivorus. Quite common is the European green woodpecker and, close to the streams, Alcedo atthis (common kingfisher), while the population of red-legged partridge is shrinking due to the decreasing amount of farmland.

== Transport ==
Antola park can be reached by car via motorway (Autostrada A7, exits of Busalla, Ronco Scrivia or Isola del Cantone) or trunk road (S.S. 35 dei Giovi, S.S. 226 di Valle Scrivia and S.S. 45 di Val Trebbia). It is also linked to Genova by the scenic Genova-Casella narrow-gauge railway.

== Hiking ==
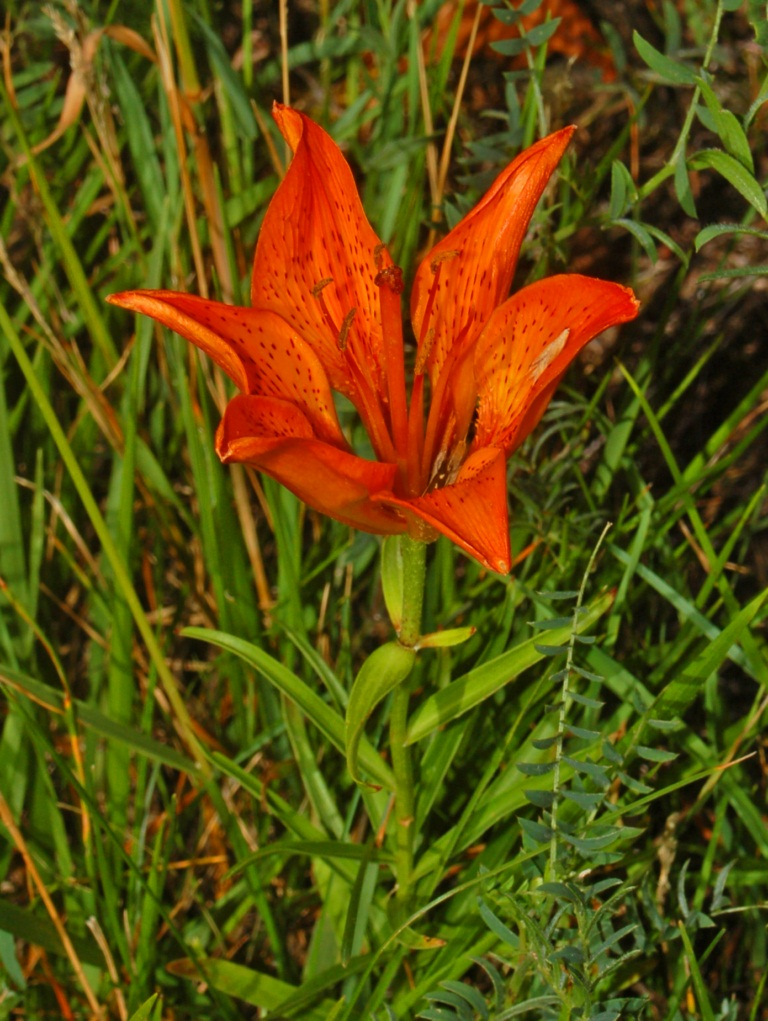
Lilium bulbiferum var. croceum, flowering in July

Around 270 km of footpaths, mostly signposted, are available within the park. The Rifugio Parco Antola, a mountain hut located at 1460 m near the summit of monte Antola, was built by the Ente Parco and is now managed by the Club Alpino Italiano. It can accommodate up to 32 hikers or alpinists.

== Bibliography ==
- Stefano Ardito (2006). Guida al Parco Naturale Regionale dell'Antola (in Italian). Erredì Grafiche Editoriali. ISBN 88-95023-00-5.
- Ente Parco Naturale Regionale dell'Antola (1999). Il parco naturale regionale dell'Antola. Guida rapida (in Italian). SAGEP. ISBN 88-7058-714-2.
- Alfred Uchman (2009). I fossili del Monte Antola (in Italian). Fondazione Luigi, Cesare e Liliana Bertora.
- Andrea Parodi, Alessio Schiavi (2015). La catena dell'Antola. 113 escursioni fra Scrivia, Trebia e Oltrepo sui monti delle quattro province (in Italian). Andrea Parodi Editore. ISBN 978-88-8887-316-9.
