= Torriglia =

- Comune
- Comune di Torriglia
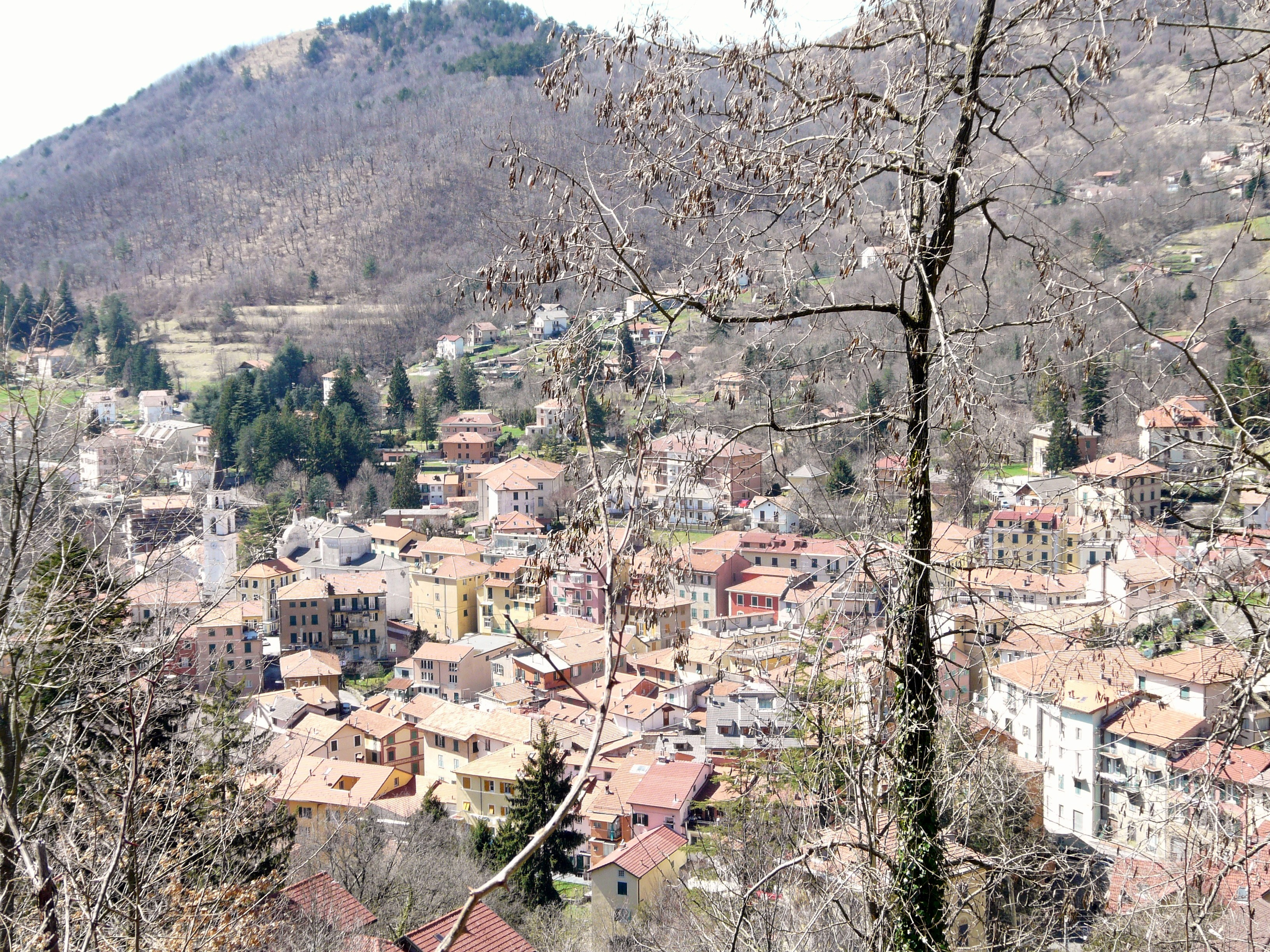
- Torriglia

- Coat of arms

- Location within Italy Location within Liguria
- Coordinates: 44°31′N 9°10′E
- Country: Italy
- Region: Liguria
- Metropolitan city: Genoa (GE)
- Frazioni: Bavastri, Casaleggio, Cavorsi, Donetta, Garaventa, Laccio, Marzano, Pentema

Government
  - Mayor: Maurizio Beltrami

Area
  - Total: 58.8 km^{2} (22.7 sq mi)
- Elevation: 769 m (2,523 ft)

Population (31 July 2015)
  - Total: 2,321
  - Density: 39.5/km^{2} (102/sq mi)
- Demonym: Torrigliesi
- Time zone: UTC+1 (CET)
  - Summer (DST): UTC+2 (CEST)
- Postal code: 16029
- Dialing code: 010
- Patron saint: Nostra Signora della Divina Provvidenza
- Saint day: Last Sunday in August
- Website: Official website

Torriglia (Ligurian: Torriggia) is a comune (municipality) in the Metropolitan City of Genoa in the Italian region Liguria, located in the upper Trebbia valley, about 20 kilometres (12 mi) northeast of Genoa. Torriglia borders the following municipalities: Davagna, Lorsica, Lumarzo, Mocònesi, Montebruno, Montoggio, Neirone, Propata, Rondanina, Valbrevenna.

== History ==
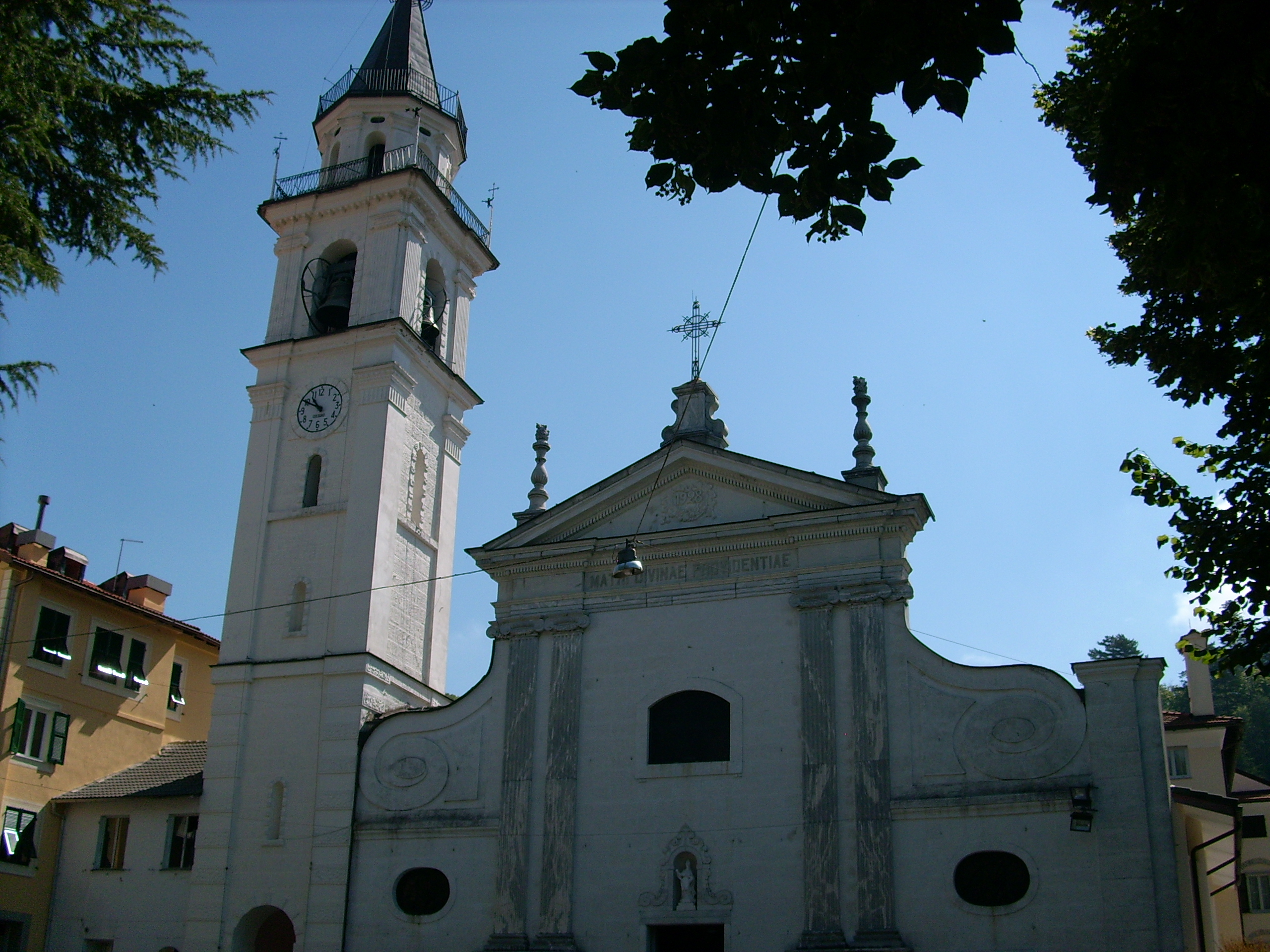
Church of Sant'Onorato in Torriglia

The town was probably founded in Roman times. In the Middle Ages it was a possession of the Bobbio Abbey, and then (1227) of the Malaspina and (mid-14th century) of the Fieschi, who built a castle here. Later it was under the Republic of Genoa, and Torriglia was involved in the wars between Guelphs and Ghibellines, causing its siege by the Genoese in 1432. In 1548 it was acquired by the Doria family, who held it until the Napoleonic invasion of 1797.

In 1815 Torriglia became part of the Kingdom of Sardinia and, from 1861, of the unified Kingdom of Italy. During World War II it was the seat of partisan resistance.

== Main sights ==
- The Castle
- Church of Sant'Onorato di Arles.
- Oratory of St. Vincent.

== People ==
- Pier Fortunato Zanfretta (1952), alien contactee

== Economy ==
Economy is mostly based on agriculture and cattle raising.

== Transport ==
Torriglia lies on the State Road 45 of Val Trebbia, connecting Genoa to Piacenza. A7 and A12 Highways can be reached from Busalla, which is also the seat of the nearest railway station.

== Other ==
Torriglia is popularly known as the UFO capital of Italy, due to the numerous "contacts" that occurred in its territory during the 1970s, which had as protagonist Pier Fortunato Zanfretta. Torriglia is known for the Canestrelletto, a small short-pastry cookie. It has the shape of a six pointed star, with a hole in the middle and a dusting of icing sugar, it even has a Festival in its honour, "Festa del Canestrelletto", held every year from 1998 in which all Producers of "Il Canestrelletto di Torriglia"® take part

== See also ==
- Parco naturale regionale dell'Antola
