= Rocche del Reopasso =

Mountain in Italy

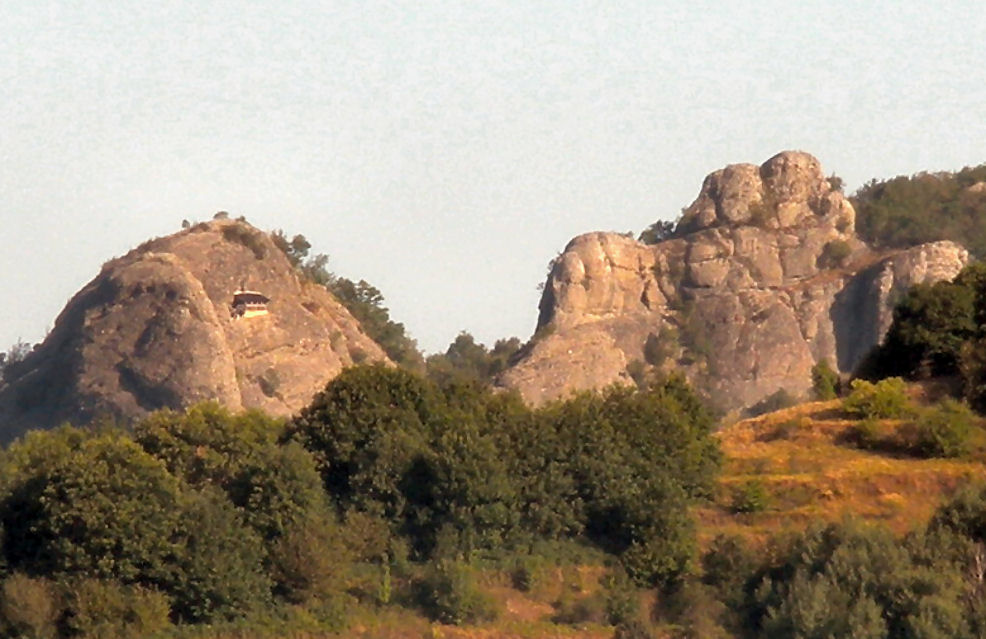

Highest point
- Elevation: 957 m (3,140 ft)
- Coordinates: 44°34′28″N 9°01′20″E

Geography
- Location within Italy
- Location: Liguria, Italy
- Parent range: Ligurian Apennines

Rocche del Reopasso is a mountain in Liguria, northern Italy, part of the Ligurian Apennines.

== Conservation ==
The mountain since 1989 is included in the Parco naturale regionale dell'Antola.
