= Valbrevenna =

Valbrevenna Varbrevenna
- Comune
- Comune di Valbrevenna
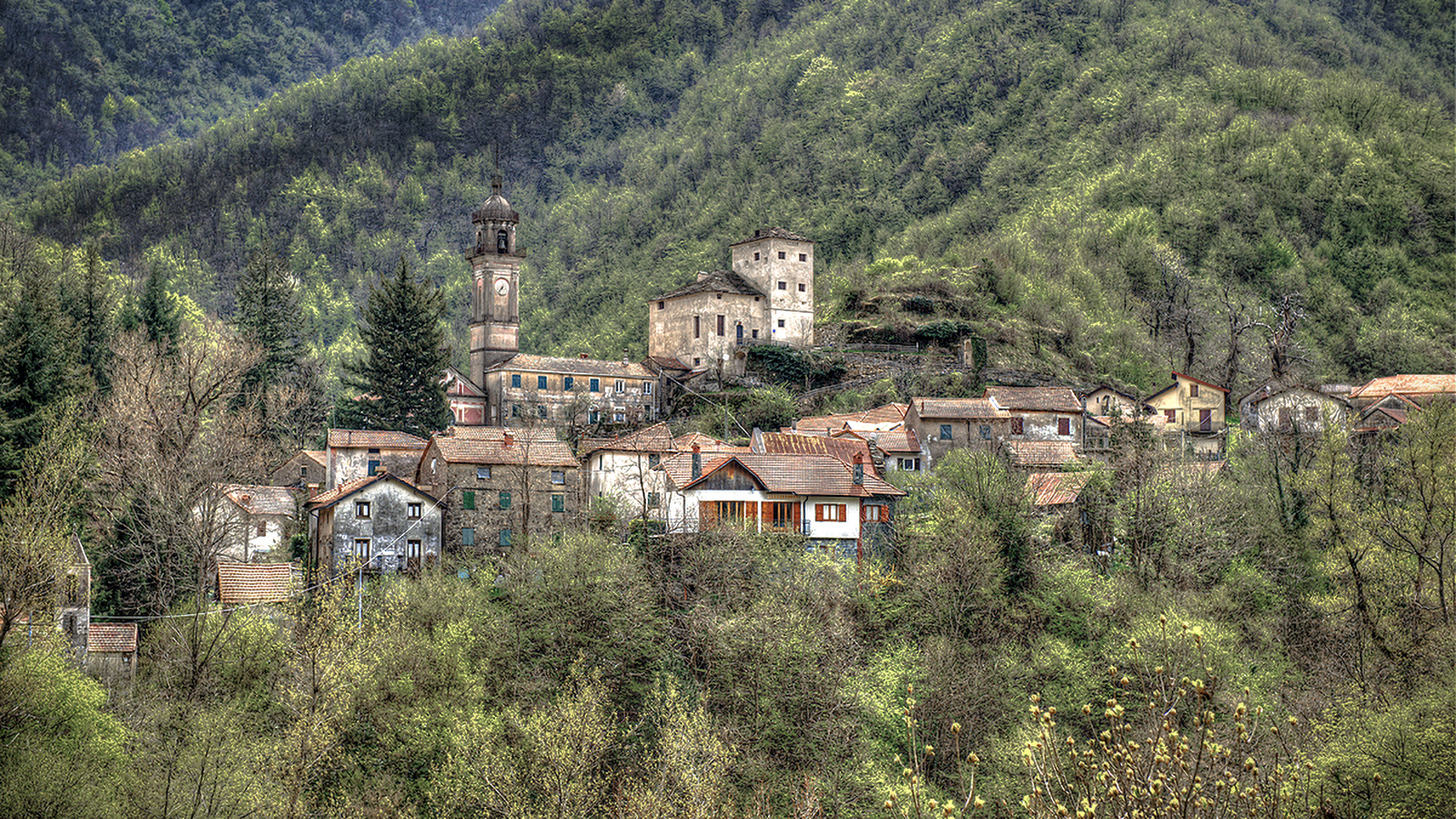
- Senarega, Valbrevenna

- Coat of arms

- Location within Italy Location within Liguria
- Coordinates: 44°33′N 9°3′E
- Country: Italy
- Region: Liguria
- Metropolitan city: Genoa (GE)

Government
  - Mayor: Michele Brassesco

Area
  - Total: 34.67 km^{2} (13.39 sq mi)
- Elevation: 533 m (1,749 ft)

Population (31 December 2015)
  - Total: 798
  - Density: 23.0/km^{2} (59.6/sq mi)
- Demonym: Valbrevennesi
- Time zone: UTC+1 (CET)
  - Summer (DST): UTC+2 (CEST)
- Postal code: 16010
- Dialing code: 010
- Website: Official website

Valbrevenna (Ligurian: Varbrevenna) is a comune (municipality) in the Metropolitan City of Genoa in the Italian region Liguria, located about 15 kilometres (9 mi) northeast of Genoa.

Valbrevenna borders the following municipalities: Carrega Ligure, Casella, Crocefieschi, Montoggio, Propata, Savignone, Torriglia, Vobbia.

== See also ==
- Parco naturale regionale dell'Antola
