= Leivi =

- Comune
- Comune di Leivi
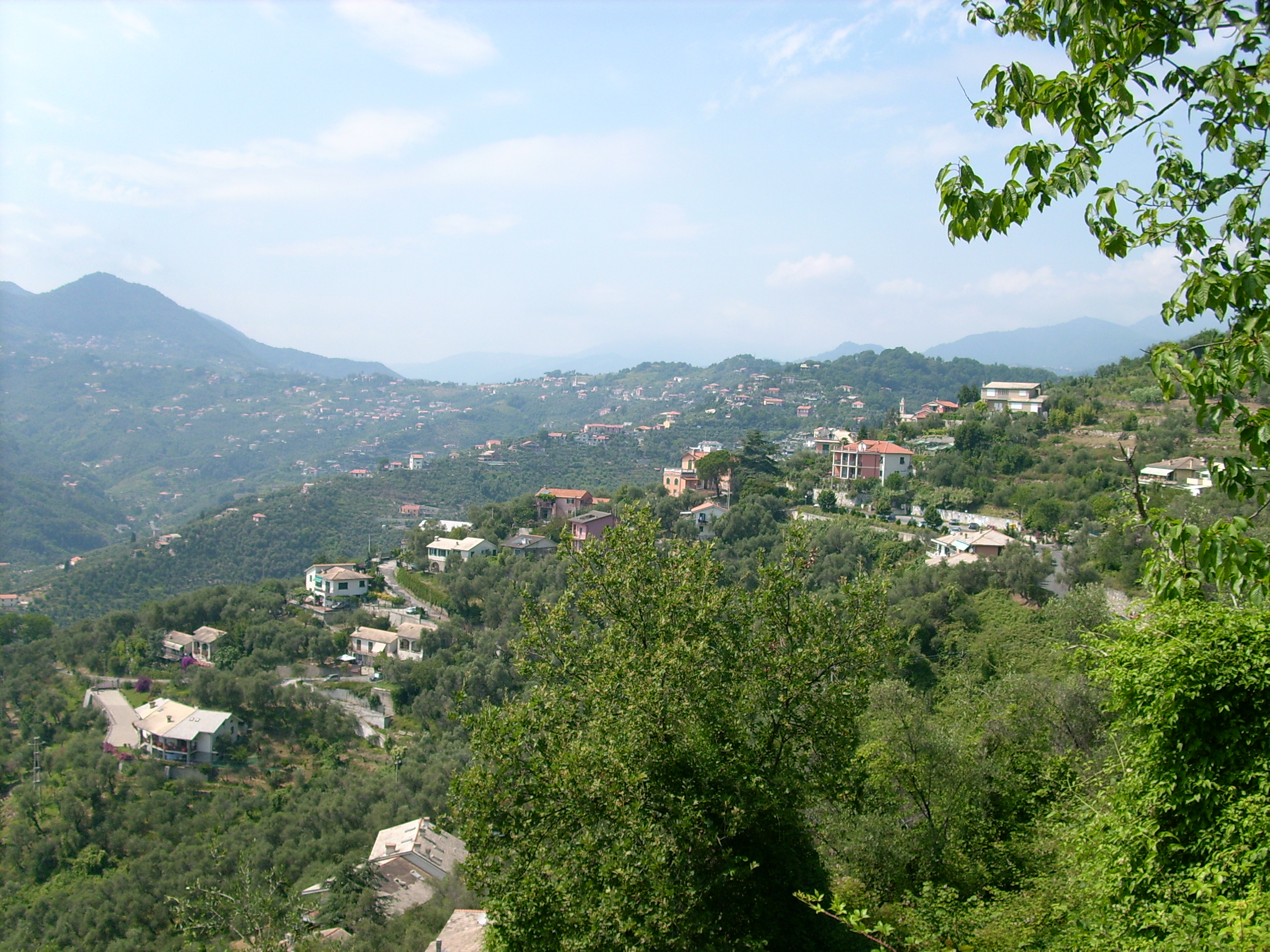

- Location within Italy Location within Liguria
- Coordinates: 44°21′N 9°19′E
- Country: Italy
- Region: Liguria
- Metropolitan city: Genoa (GE)
- Frazioni: Bocco, Curlo, Mezzo, Rostio, San Bartolomeo, San Rufino di Leivi, Solaro (municipal seat)

Government
  - Mayor: Vittorio Centanaro

Area
  - Total: 9.71 km^{2} (3.75 sq mi)
- Elevation: 118 m (387 ft)

Population (31 August 2017)
  - Total: 2,435
  - Density: 251/km^{2} (649/sq mi)
- Demonym: Leivesi
- Time zone: UTC+1 (CET)
  - Summer (DST): UTC+2 (CEST)
- Postal code: 16040
- Dialing code: 0185
- Patron saint: St. John the Baptist
- Saint day: 24 June
- Website: Official website

Leivi is a town and comune in the Metropolitan City of Genoa, in the Liguria region of northwest Italy.

Leivi sits in the Apennine hills, 6 kilometres (4 mi) from the town of Chiavari, overlooking the Gulf of Tigullio.

It is a centre for the production of olive oil.
