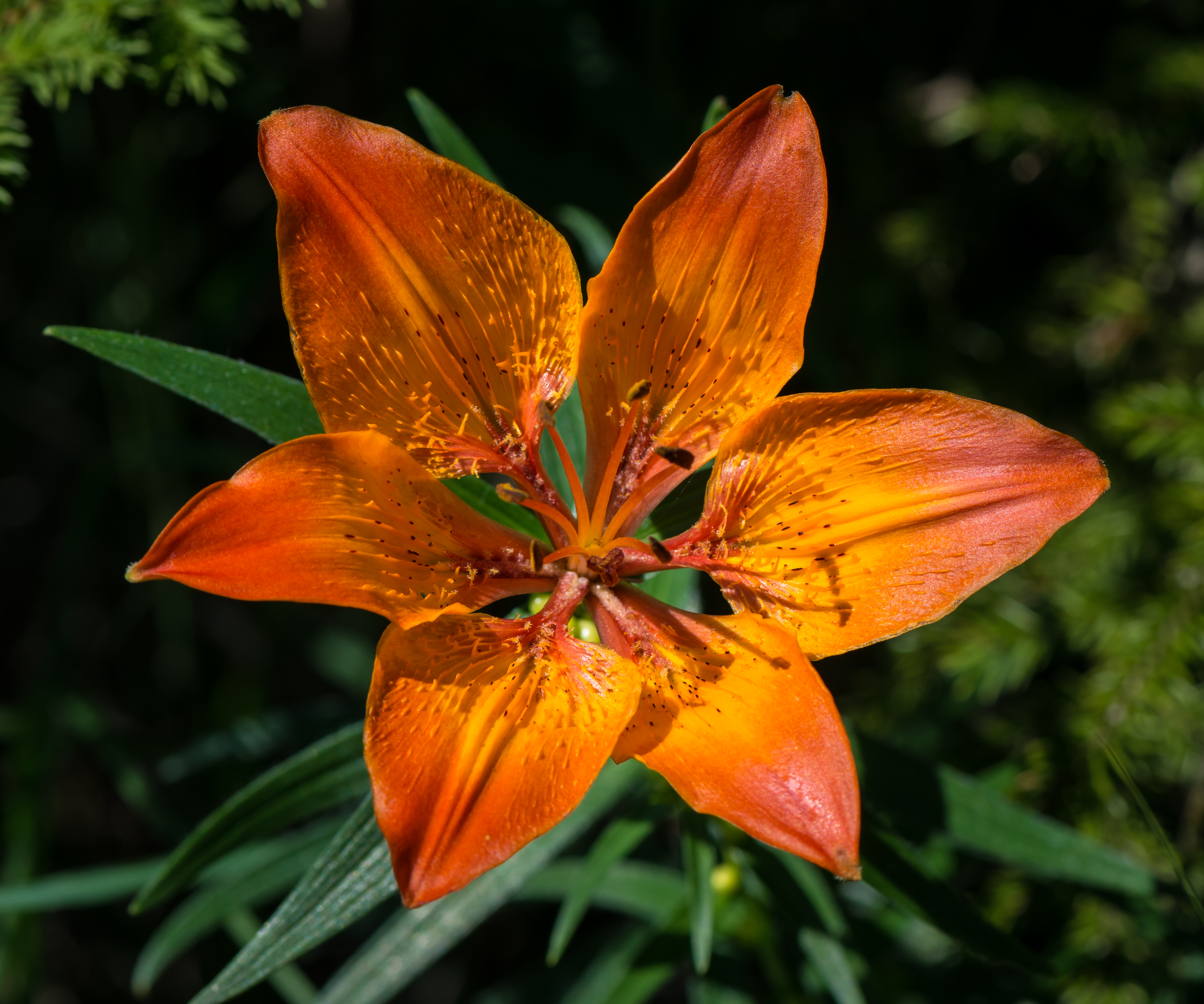

Scientific classification
- Kingdom: Plantae
- Clade: Tracheophytes
- Clade: Angiosperms
- Clade: Monocots
- Order: Liliales
- Family: Liliaceae
- Subfamily: Lilioideae
- Genus: Lilium
- Species: L. bulbiferum

Binomial name
- Lilium bulbiferum L. 1753 not Thunb. 1794

Synonyms
- Synonymy: Lilium atrosanguineum H.Vilm.; Lilium aurantiacum Weston, 1772; Lilium biligulatum Baker; Lilium chaixii Maw; Lilium croceum Chaix; Lilium elatum Salisb.; Lilium fulgens E.Morren ex Spae; Lilium fulgens W.H.Baxter; Lilium haematochroum Lem.; Lilium humile Mill., 1768; Lilium lateritium Baker; Lilium latifolium Link; Lilium luteum Gaterau, 1789; Lilium pictum Baker; Lilium pubescens Bernh. ex Hornem.; Lilium sanguineum Lindl.; Lilium scabrum Moench, 1794; Lilium sibiricum Willd.; plus many names at the varietal level

= Lilium bulbiferum =

Species of lily

Lilium bulbiferum, common names orange lily, fire lily, Jimmy's Bane, tiger lily and St. John's Lily, is a herbaceous European lily with underground bulbs, belonging to the Liliaceae.

The Latin name bulbiferum of this species, meaning "bearing bulbs", refers to the secondary bulbs on the stem of the nominal subspecies.

== Description ==
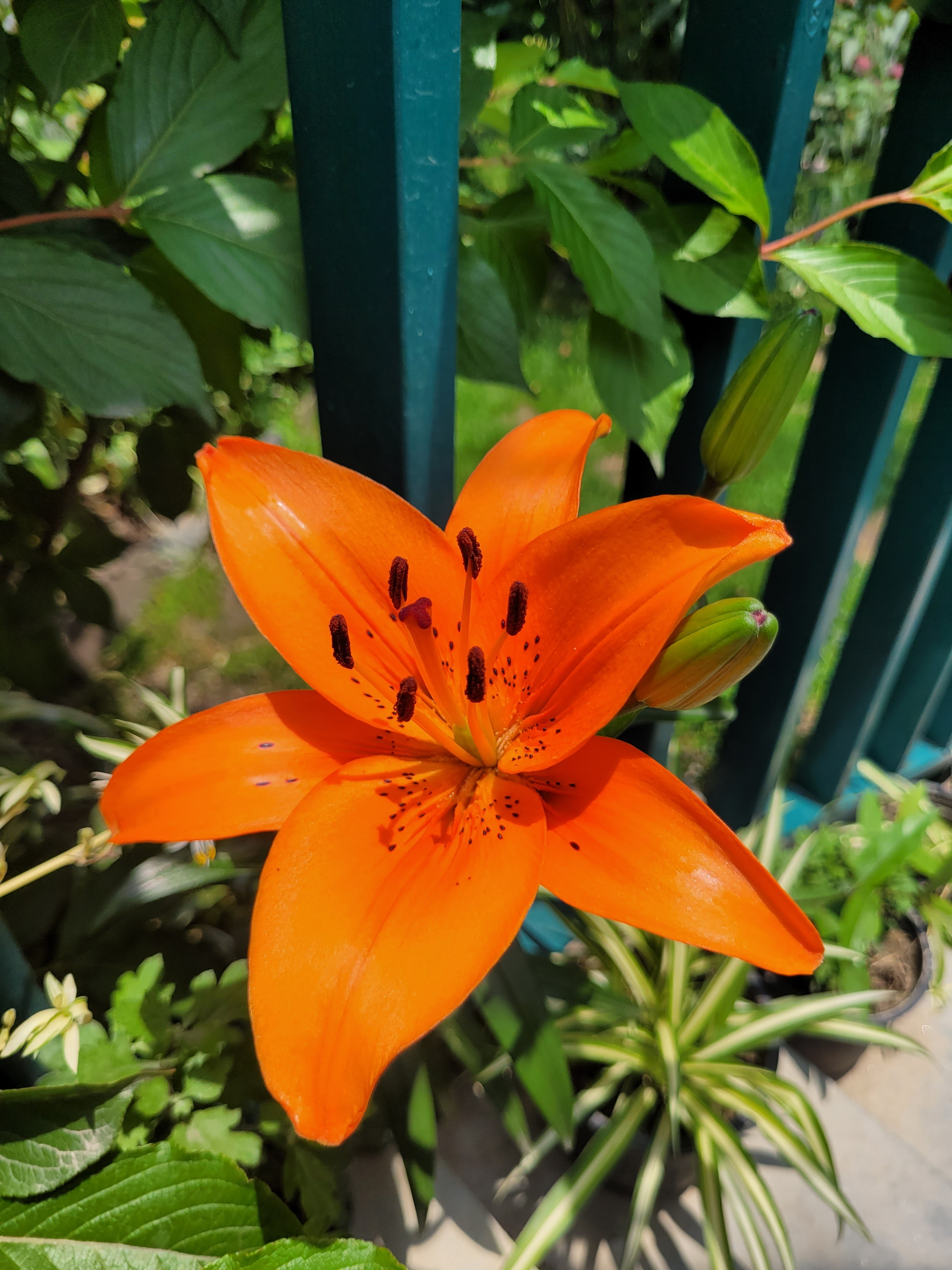
Flower and flower buds

Lilium bulbiferum reaches on average 20–90 centimetres (7.9–35.4 in) of height, with a maximum of 120 centimetres (47 in). The bulbs are ovoid, with whitish large and pointed scales and can reach about 1.5 centimetres (0.59 in) of diameter. The stem is erect, the leaves are lanceolate, up to 10 centimeters long. The inflorescence has one to five short-haired flowers. They are hermaphroditic and scentless, have six upright tepals, the outer are slightly narrower than the inner ones. The flowers can reach 4–6 centimeters in length and are bright yellow-orange with reddish-brown dots. The stamens are erect, about half as long as the tepals, with red anthers. The style is orange, 35 millimetres (1.4 in) of height. The flowering period extends from May through July.

There are two varieties, L. b. var. croceum (Chaix) Baker in the western part of the range, and L. b. var. bulbiferum in its eastern part. Only the last one always produces secondary aerial bulbs (bulbils) in the axils of the upper leaves. These bulbils fall to the ground and mature after two to three years. When manually separated from the stem they can easily be used for propagating the plant.

The dwarf plants from the Maritime Alps, formerly described as var. chaixii (Elwes) Stoker, and the large plants from the region of Naples, formerly described as var. giganteum N. Terracc., are now considered as local variants of var. croceum.

Extrafloral nectaries on the species were first noted by Zimmerman 1932, at least for var. croceum.

== Distribution and habitat ==
L. bulbiferum is widely distributed in much of Europe from Spain to Finland and Ukraine. It grows in mountain meadows and on hillsides. They prefer calcareous soils in warm, sunny places, but also grow on slightly acid soils. They can be found at an altitude of 500–1,900 metres (1,600–6,200 ft) above sea level.

== Toxicity to cats ==
Cats are extremely sensitive to lily toxicity and ingestion is often fatal; households and gardens which are visited by cats are strongly advised against keeping this plant or placing dried flowers where a cat may brush against them and become dusted with pollen which they then consume while cleaning. Suspected cases require urgent veterinary attention. Rapid treatment with activated charcoal or induced vomiting can reduce the amount of toxin absorbed (this is time-sensitive so in some cases veterinarians may advise doing it at home), and large amounts of fluid by IV can reduce damage to kidneys to increase the chances of survival.

== In culture ==
The orange lily has long been recognised as a symbol of the Orange Order in Northern Ireland.
