= Vobbia =

Vobbia Veubbia
- Comune
- Comune di Vobbia
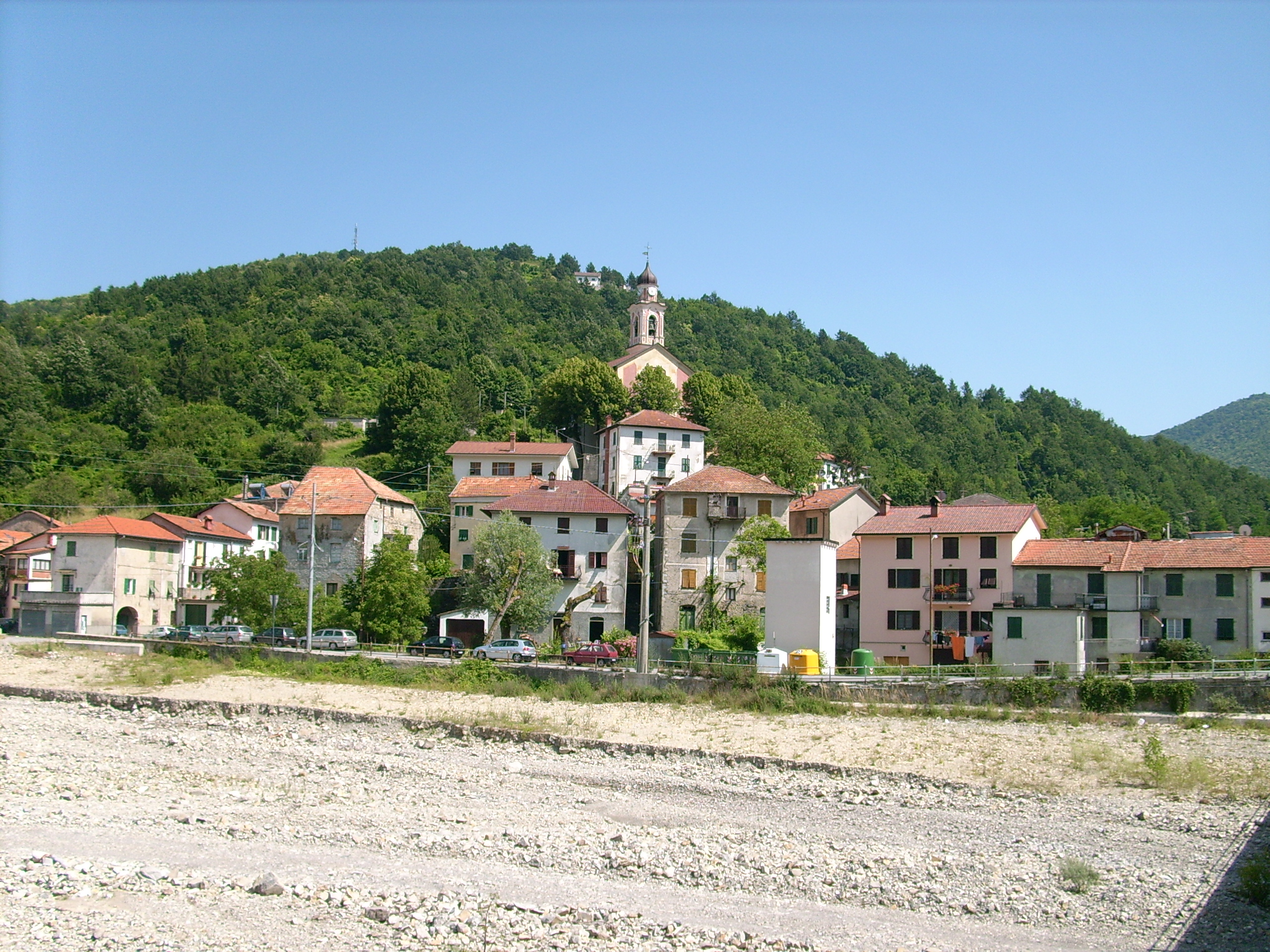
- Vobbia

- Location within Italy Location within Liguria
- Coordinates: 44°36′N 9°2′E
- Country: Italy
- Region: Liguria
- Metropolitan city: Genoa (GE)
- Frazioni: Fabio, Torre, Canova, Selva

Government
  - Mayor: Simone Franceschi

Area
  - Total: 33.1 km^{2} (12.8 sq mi)
- Elevation: 477 m (1,565 ft)

Population (31 December 2015)
  - Total: 409
  - Density: 12.4/km^{2} (32.0/sq mi)
- Demonym: Vobbiesi
- Time zone: UTC+1 (CET)
  - Summer (DST): UTC+2 (CEST)
- Postal code: 16010
- Dialing code: 010
- Website: Official website

Vobbia (Ligurian: Veubbia) is a comune (municipality) in the Metropolitan City of Genoa in the Italian region Liguria, located about 20 kilometres (12 mi) northeast of Genoa. Vobbia borders the following municipalities: Busalla, Carrega Ligure, Crocefieschi, Isola del Cantone, Mongiardino Ligure, Valbrevenna.

== See also ==
- Parco naturale regionale dell'Antola
