= Metropolitan City of Genoa =

Metropolitan city of Italy

Metropolitan City of Genoa Città metropolitana di Genova (Italian)
- Metropolitan city
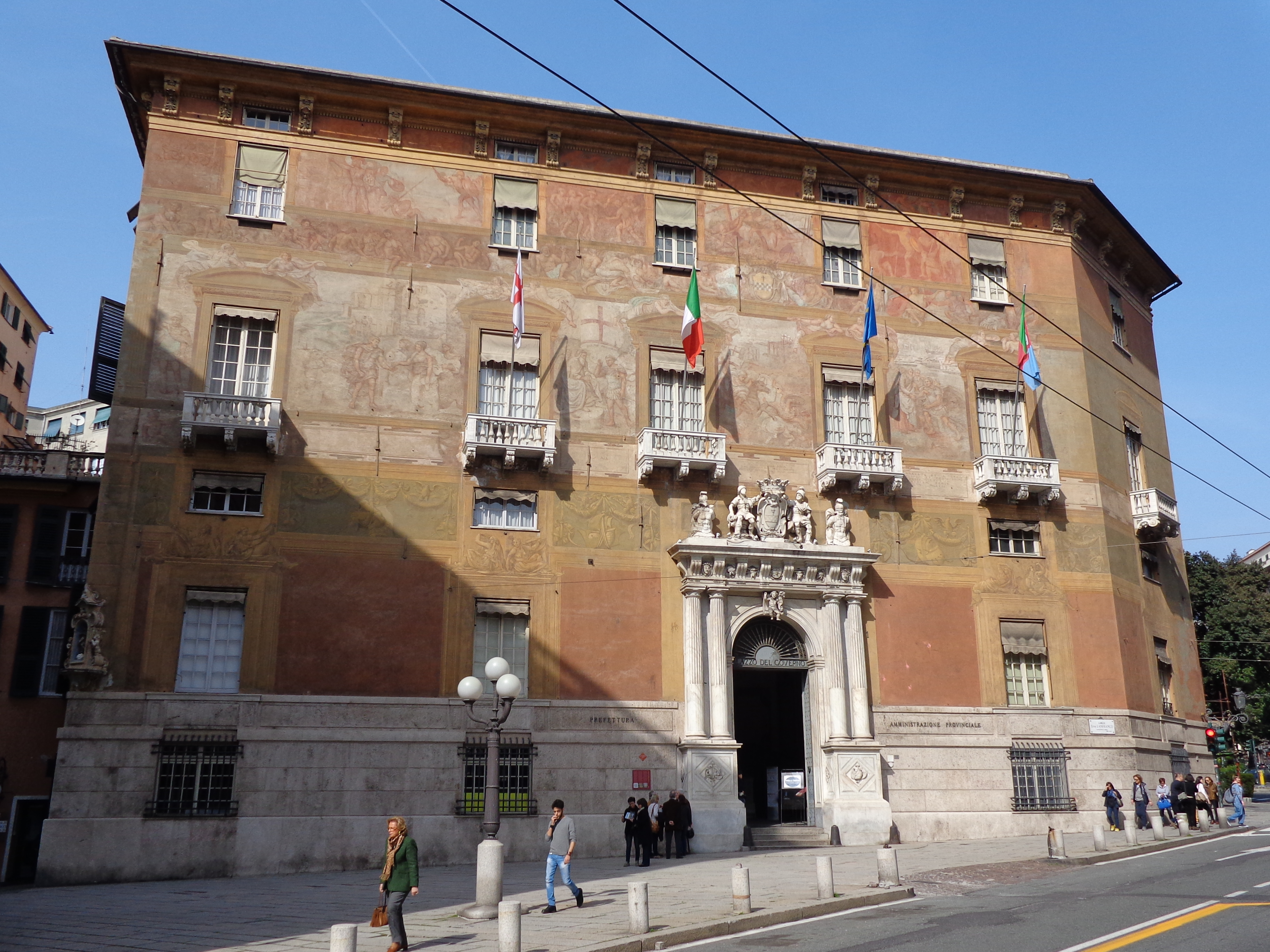
- Palazzo Doria Spinola, the seat of the Metropolitan City

- Flag Coat of arms

- Location of the Metropolitan City of Genoa in Italy
- Coordinates: 44.4111°N 8.9325°E
- Country: Italy
- Region: Liguria
- Established: 1 January 2015
- Capital(s): Genoa
- Municipalities: 67

Government
  - Metropolitan mayor: Silvia Salis (Independent Center-left)

Area
  - Total: 1,833.79 km^{2} (708.03 sq mi)

Population (2026)
  - Total: 820,691
  - Density: 447.538/km^{2} (1,159.12/sq mi)

GDP
  - Metro: €28.753 billion (2015)
  - Per capita: €33,506 (2015)
- Time zone: UTC+1 (CET)
  - Summer (DST): UTC+2 (CEST)
- Postal code: 16100
- Telephone prefix: 010, 0185
- ISO 3166 code: IT-GE
- Vehicle registration: GE
- ISTAT code: 210
- Website: Official website

The Metropolitan City of Genoa (Italian: città metropolitana di Genova) is a metropolitan city in the region of Liguria in northern Italy. Its capital is the city of Genoa. It replaced the province of Genoa in 2015. It has a population of 820,691 in an area of 1,833.79 square kilometres (708.03 mi^{2}) across its 67 municipalities.

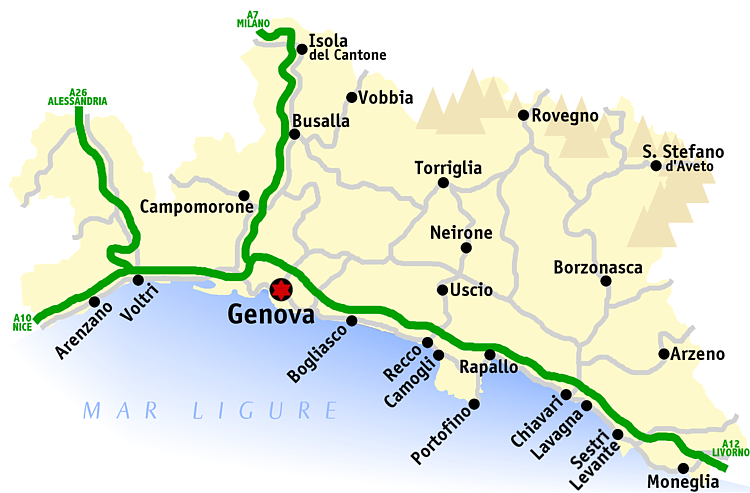
Detailed map of the Metropolitan City of Genoa

== History ==
It was first created by the reform of local authorities (Law 142/1990) and then established by the Law 56/2014. It has been operative since 1 January 2015. With the establishment of the Republic of Genoa in the 11th century, the whole territory subjected to it was divided into underlying local podesterias. At the same time, in some areas of the Genoese territory, the creation of lordships, subjected or, in other cases, even semi-independent from Genoa, were administered by the various noble families of the time; among these the Fieschi, the Spinola, the Doria and the Malaspina, among the best known. Administrative and jurisdictional divisions of the territory which on several occasions also led to clashes between cities, sometimes even neighboring ones, in favor or against the domination of "La Superba".

The history of the provincial territory remained almost tied to the historical facts that affected the Genoese republic, until its end in 1797. In 1800, Napoleon became Emperor and King of Italy, and it became part of the French Empire. When Napoleon was defeated in 1814, it became part of the Kingdom of Sardinia. At that time Genoa was the most important port and trading center in Italy.

The Metropolitan City of Genoa was established in 1859 by decree and was established on 1 March 1860. The first chairman was Antonio Caveri, a lawyer. It was subdivided into five districts, Levante, Chiavari, Genoa, Savona, and Albenga, which largely corresponded to previous divisions of the Republic of Genoa, which had broken up after Napoleon's Italian campaign. King Victor Emmanuel II approved the Metropolitan City's coat of arms in 1875 and they were amended in 1933 by the Fascist government by the addition of fasces.

== Government ==
The Metropolitan City is headed by the Metropolitan Mayor (Italian: Sindaco metropolitano) and by the Metropolitan Council (Italian: Consiglio metropolitano).

List of Metropolitan Mayors of Genoa
No.	Portrait	Name	Term start	Term end	Party	Position
1		Marco Doria (1957– )	1 January 2015	27 June 2017	Independent, left-leaning (Note: Supported by SEL and PRC in the center-left primaries.)	Metropolitan Mayor
2		Marco Bucci (1959– )	27 June 2017	6 November 2022	Independent, center-right	Metropolitan Mayor
2		Marco Bucci (1959– )	6 November 2022	9 December 2024	Independent, center-right	Metropolitan Mayor
—		Antonio Segalerba (1970– )	9 December 2024	29 May 2025	Independent, center-right (Note: Supported by "For the Metropolitan City".)	Deputy Metropolitan Mayor (Note: (Acting))
3		Silvia Salis (1985– )	30 May 2025	Incumbent	Independent, center-left (Note: Supported by Democratic Party (Italy), Five Star Movement, and Green and Left Alliance.)	Metropolitan Mayor

=== Municipalities ===
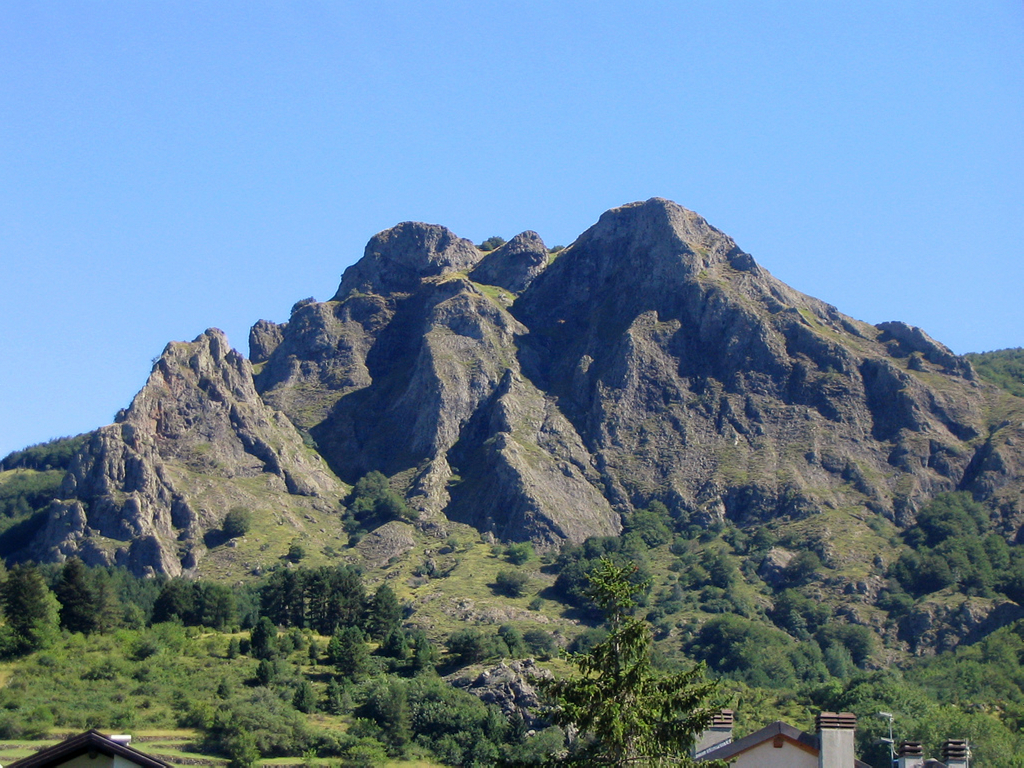
Aveto Natural Regional Park

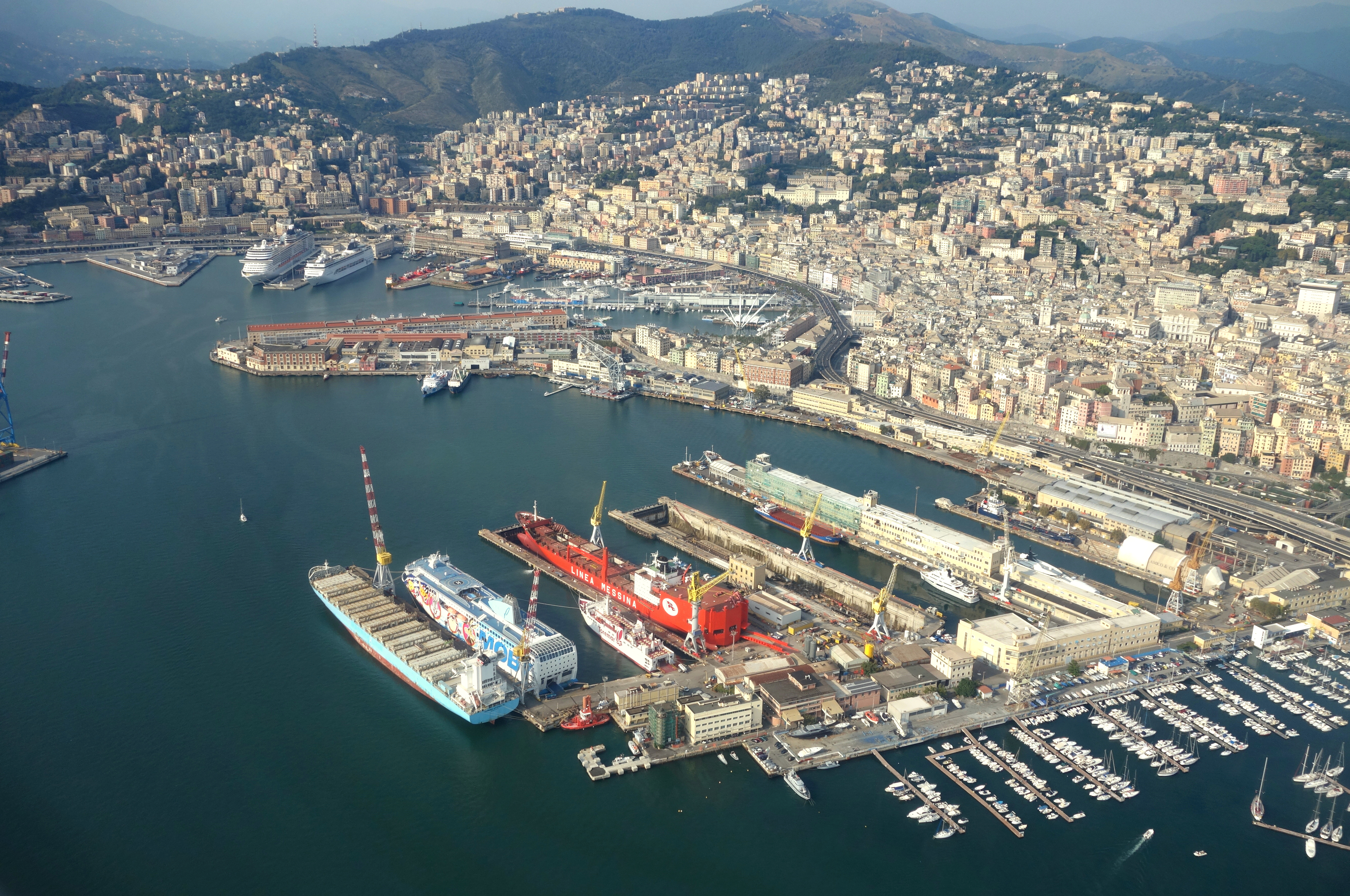
The port of Genoa is the busiest in Italy

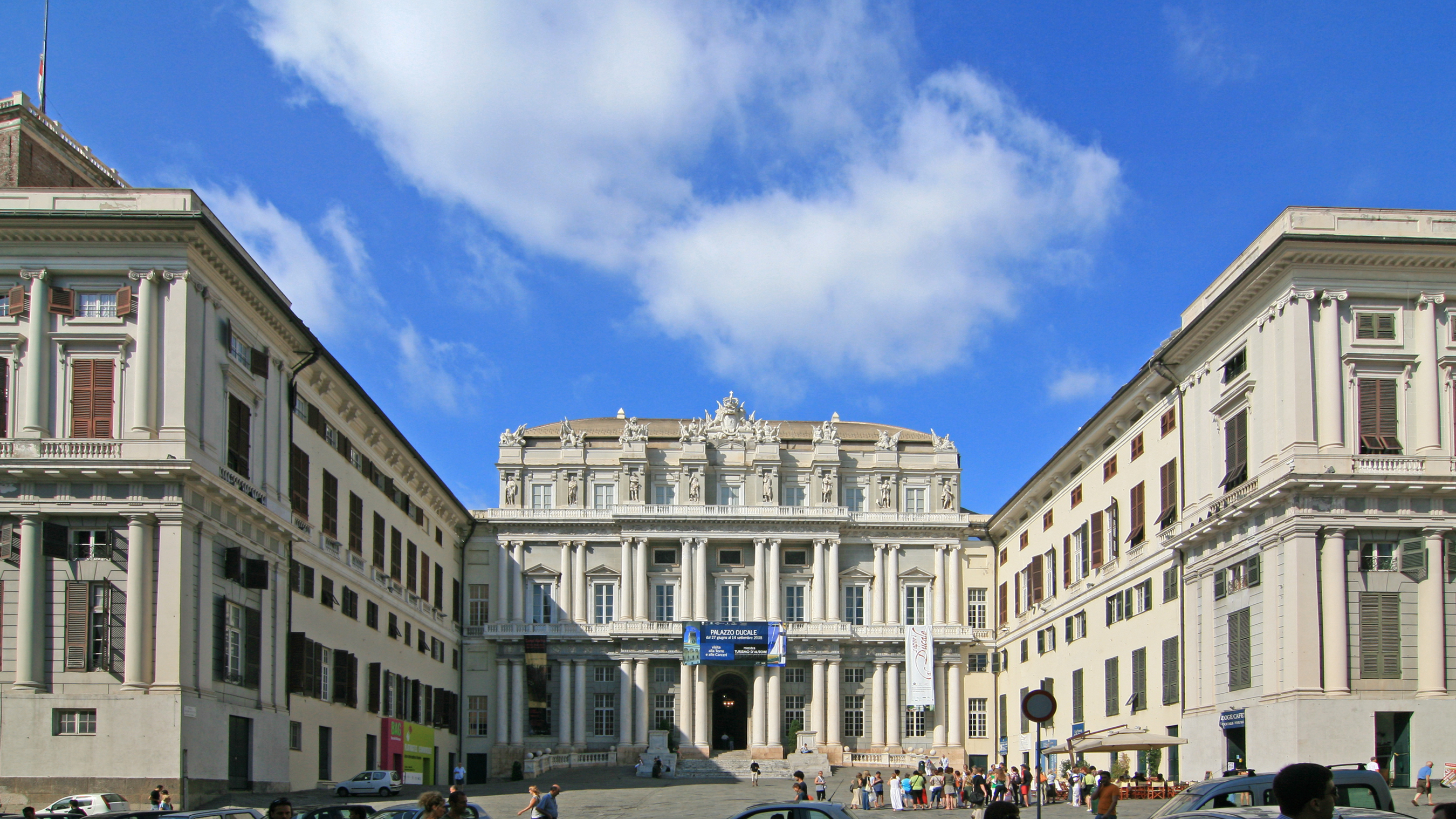
Doge's Palace, Genoa

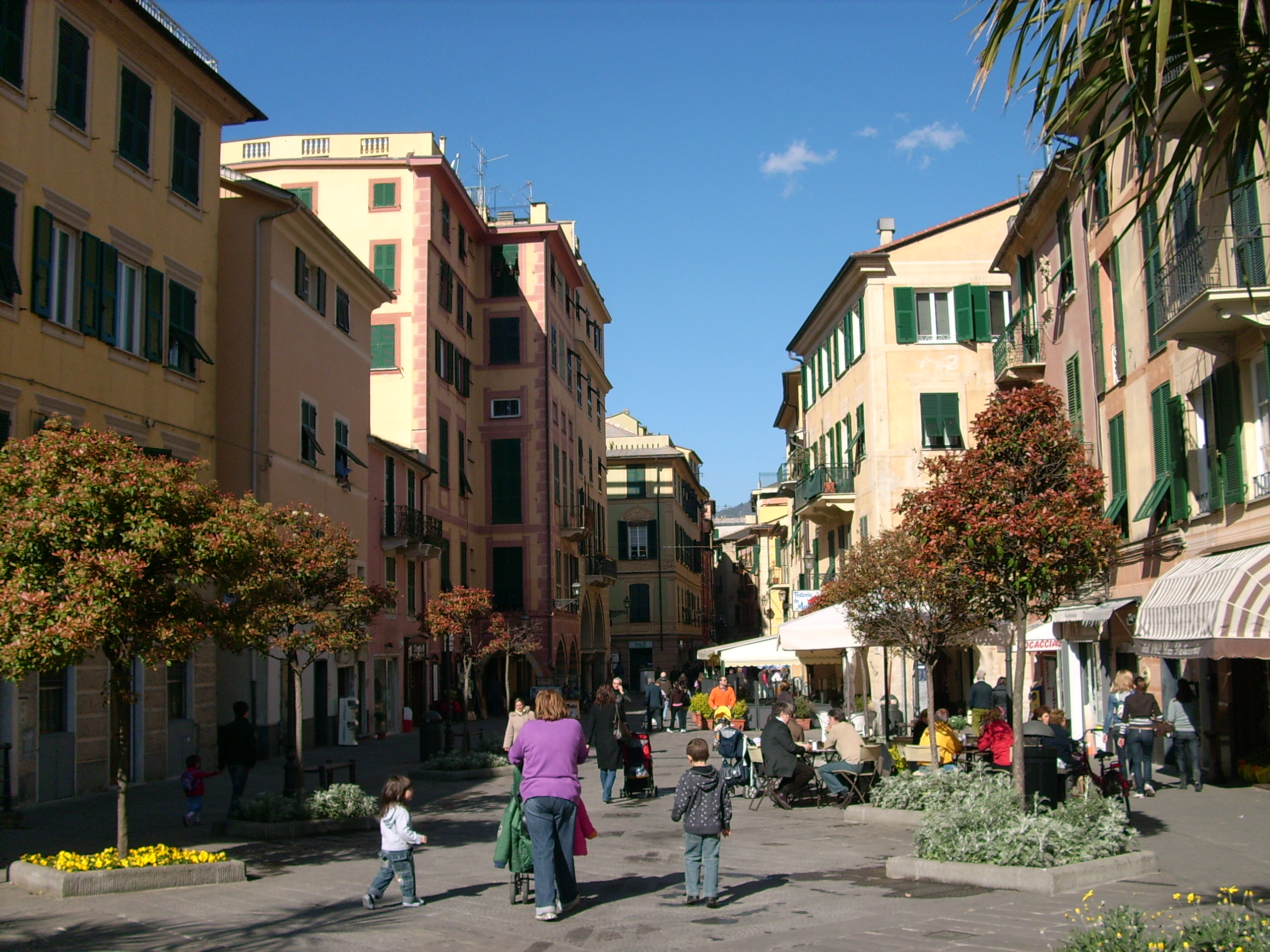
Rapallo

Chiavari

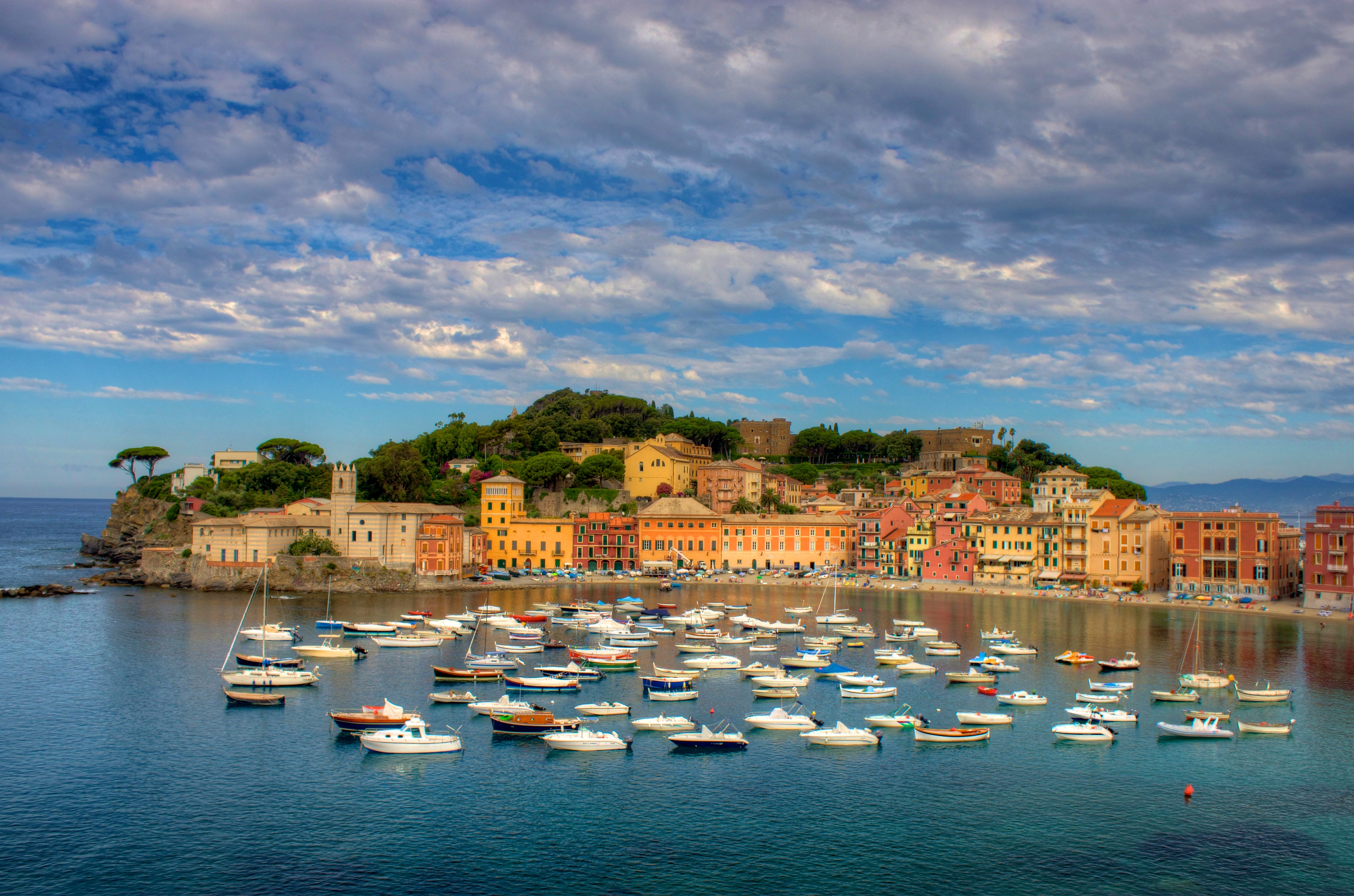
Sestri Levante

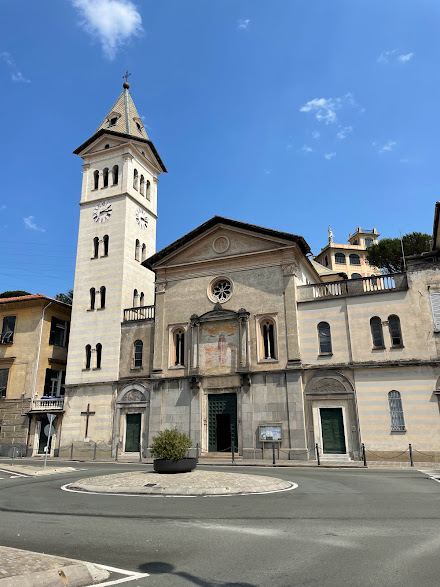
Lavagna

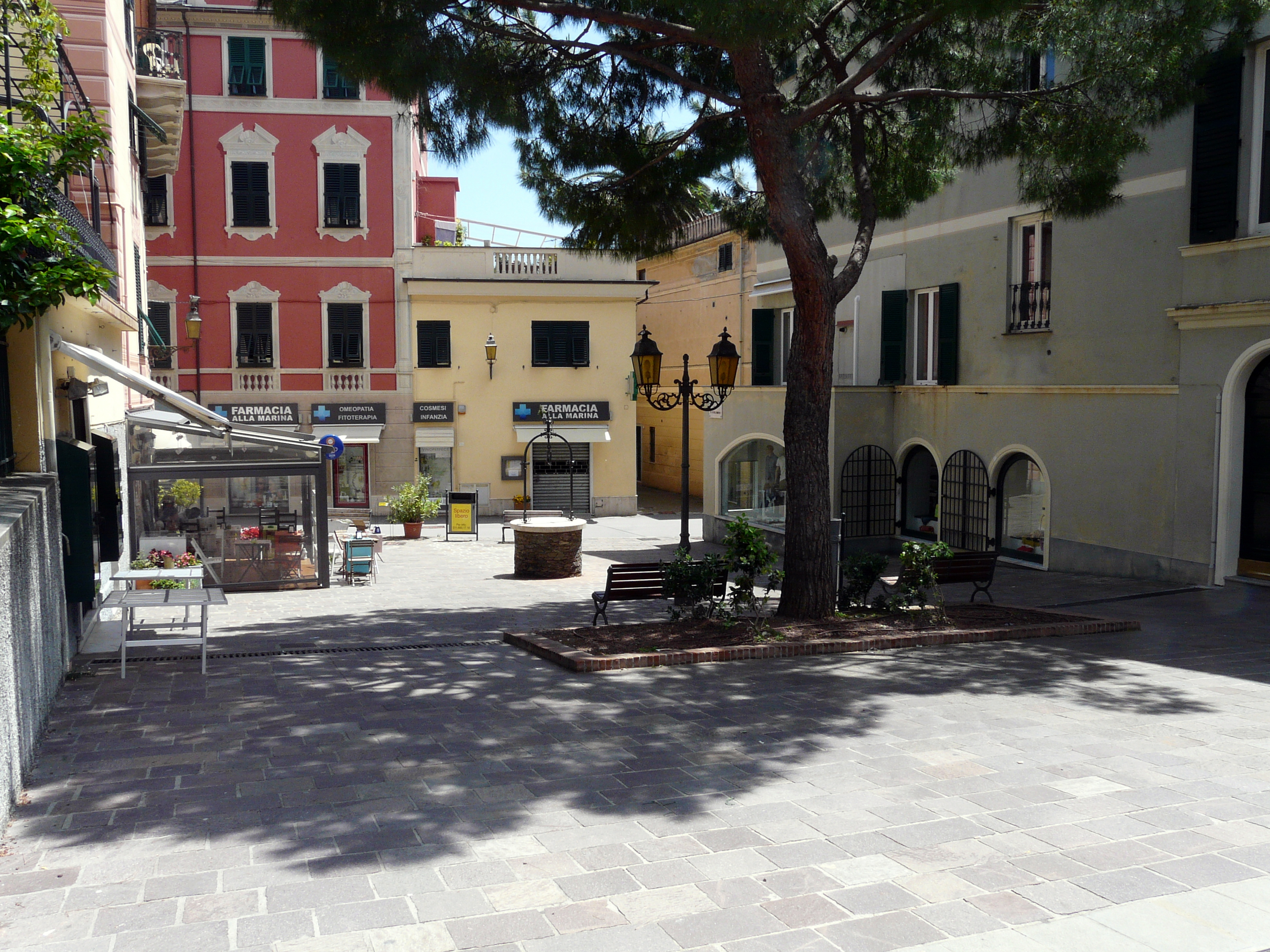
Arenzano

The metropolitan city has 67 municipalities:

- Arenzano
- Avegno
- Bargagli
- Bogliasco
- Borzonasca
- Busalla
- Camogli
- Campo Ligure
- Campomorone
- Carasco
- Casarza Ligure
- Casella
- Castiglione Chiavarese
- Ceranesi
- Chiavari
- Cicagna
- Cogoleto
- Cogorno
- Coreglia Ligure
- Crocefieschi
- Davagna
- Fascia
- Favale di Malvaro
- Fontanigorda
- Genoa
- Gorreto
- Isola del Cantone
- Lavagna
- Leivi
- Lorsica
- Lumarzo
- Masone
- Mele
- Mezzanego
- Mignanego
- Moconesi
- Moneglia
- Montebruno
- Montoggio
- Ne
- Neirone
- Orero
- Pieve Ligure
- Portofino
- Propata
- Rapallo
- Recco
- Rezzoaglio
- Ronco Scrivia
- Rondanina
- Rossiglione
- Rovegno
- San Colombano Certenoli
- Sant'Olcese
- Santa Margherita Ligure
- Santo Stefano d'Aveto
- Savignone
- Serra Riccò
- Sestri Levante
- Sori
- Tiglieto
- Torriglia
- Tribogna
- Uscio
- Valbrevenna
- Vobbia
- Zoagli

== Demographics ==
As of 2026, the population is 820,691, of which 48.4% are male, and 51.6% are female. Minors make up 12.8% of the population, and seniors make up 29.5%.

Historical population

Year	Pop.	±%
1861	456,889	—
1871	484,720	+6.1%
1881	515,946	+6.4%
1901	598,550	+16.0%
1911	686,823	+14.7%
1921	769,894	+12.1%
1931	891,891	+15.8%
1936	867,608	−2.7%

Year	Pop.	±%
1951	928,890	+7.1%
1961	1,031,091	+11.0%
1971	1,087,973	+5.5%
1981	1,045,109	−3.9%
1991	950,849	−9.0%
2001	878,082	−7.7%
2011	855,834	−2.5%
2021	817,402	−4.5%

Source: ISTAT

=== Immigration ===
As of 2025, immigrants make up 14.0% of the population. The 5 largest foreign countries of birth are Ecuador, Albania, Morocco, Romania, and Bangladesh.

== Transport ==
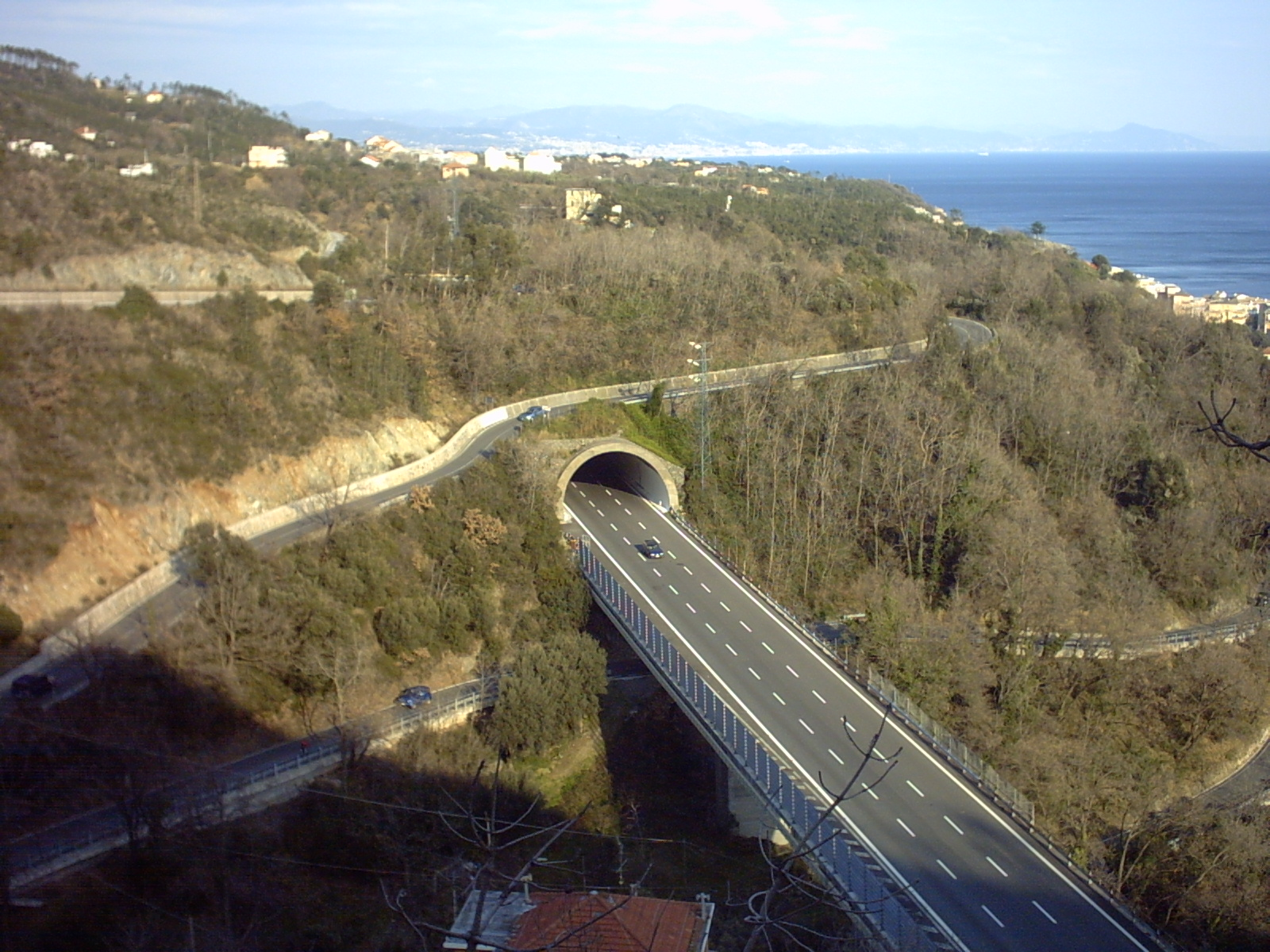
Autostrada A10 near Cogoleto

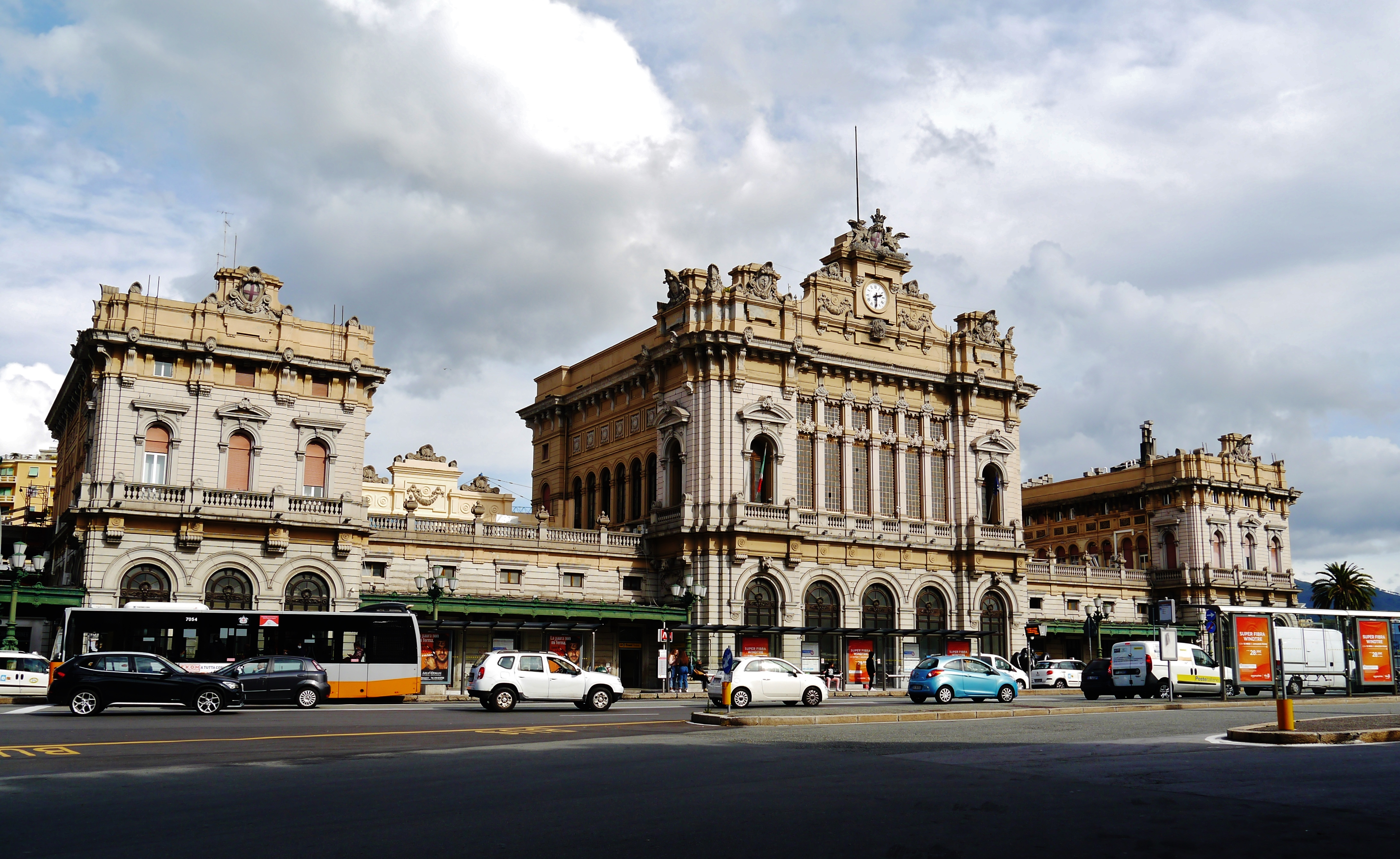
Genova Brignole railway station

=== Motorways ===
The Metropolitan City is crossed by the following motorways (in Italian, autostrade):

- Autostrada A7: Milan-Genoa
- Autostrada A10: Genoa-Ventimiglia
- Autostrada A12: Genoa-Rome
- Autostrada A26: Genoa-Gravellona Toce

=== Railway lines ===
- Turin–Genoa railway
- Genoa–Ventimiglia railway
- Genoa–Pisa railway

== See also ==
- Province of Genoa
- Aveto Natural Regional Park
