= Savignone =

Savignone Savignon
- Comune
- Comune di Savignone
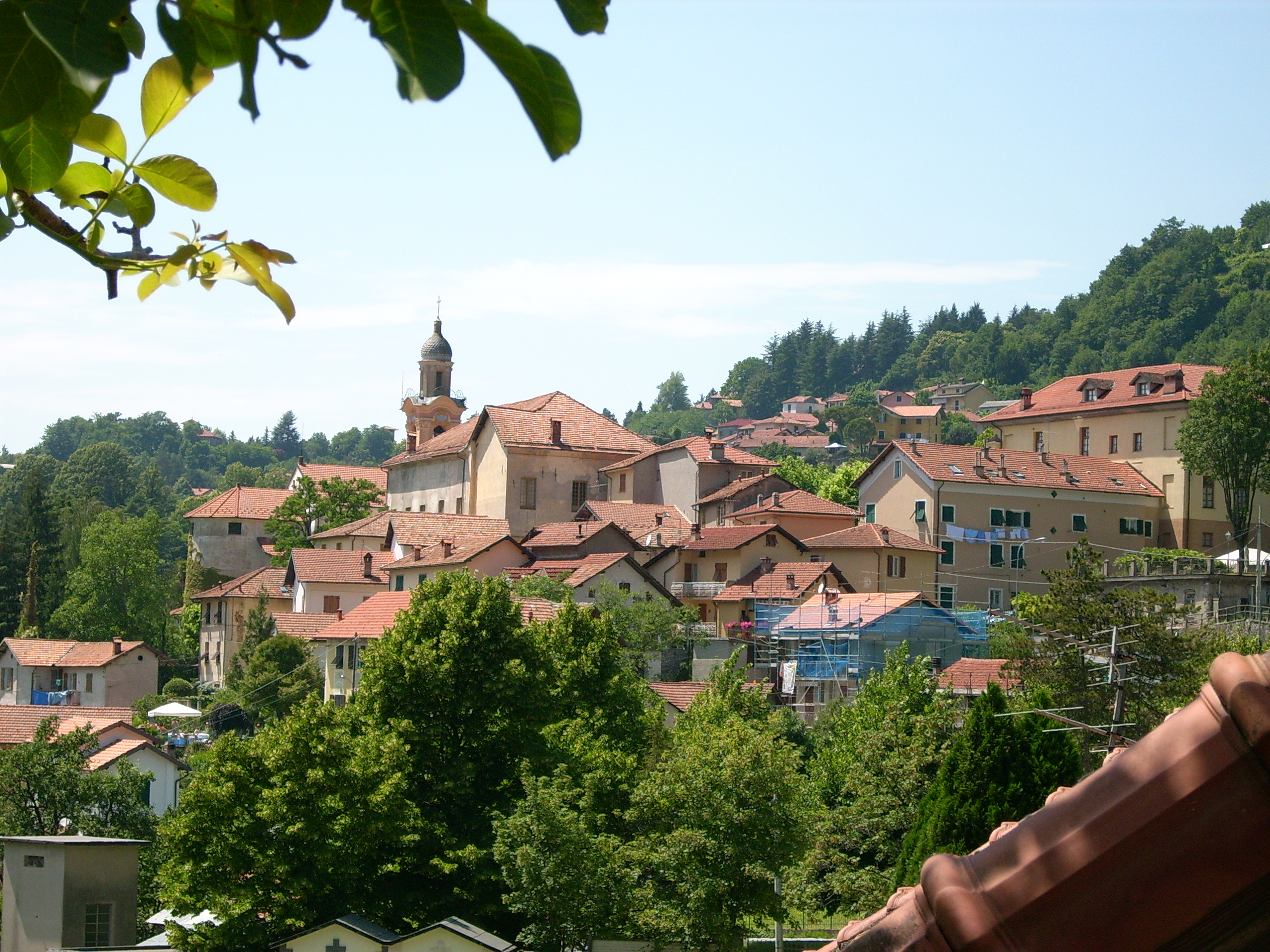
- Savignone

- Coat of arms

- Location within Italy Location within Liguria
- Coordinates: 44°34′N 8°59′E
- Country: Italy
- Region: Liguria
- Metropolitan city: Genoa (GE)
- Frazioni: Isorelle, San Bartolomeo, Gabbie, Montemaggio, Ponte Vaccarezza, Sorrivi

Government
  - Mayor: Antonio Bigotti

Area
  - Total: 21.8 km^{2} (8.4 sq mi)
- Elevation: 500 m (1,600 ft)

Population (31 December 2011)
  - Total: 3,225
  - Density: 148/km^{2} (383/sq mi)
- Demonym: Savignonesi
- Time zone: UTC+1 (CET)
  - Summer (DST): UTC+2 (CEST)
- Postal code: 16010
- Dialing code: 010
- Patron saint: St. Augustine
- Saint day: August 28
- Website: Official website

Savignone (Ligurian: Savignon) is a comune (municipality) in the Metropolitan City of Genoa in the Italian region Liguria, located about 15 kilometres (9 mi) north of Genoa.

Savignone borders the following municipalities: Busalla, Casella, Crocefieschi, Mignanego, Serra Riccò, Valbrevenna.

== History ==
The area of Savignone was settled probably in the Iron Age. In the Middle Ages it was a fief of Tortona, and in 1242 it was acquired by the Republic of Genoa which entrusted it to the Spinola family. Later it was under the Fieschi, who sold it back to Genoa in 1636. From 1815 it was part of the Kingdom of Sardinia, belonging to Italy from 1861.

== Main sights ==
- Fieschi castle (13th century)
- Palazzo Fieschi (16th century)
- Parish church of St. Bartholomew, housing two canvasses by Luca Cambiaso.

== Demographic evolution ==
Historical population

Year	Pop.	±%
1861	2,189	—
1871	2,203	+0.6%
1881	2,306	+4.7%
1901	2,543	+10.3%
1911	2,395	−5.8%

Year	Pop.	±%
1921	2,367	−1.2%
1931	2,365	−0.1%
1936	2,449	+3.6%
1951	2,586	+5.6%
1961	2,211	−14.5%

Year	Pop.	±%
1971	2,219	+0.4%
1981	2,600	+17.2%
1991	2,882	+10.8%
2001	3,127	+8.5%

Source: Data from ISTAT

== See also ==
- Parco naturale regionale dell'Antola
