= Rondanina =

Rondanina Rondaninn-a
- Comune
- Comune di Rondanina

- Coat of arms

- Location within Italy Location within Liguria
- Coordinates: 44°34′N 9°13′E
- Country: Italy
- Region: Liguria
- Metropolitan city: Genoa (GE)

Government
  - Mayor: Arnaldo Mangini

Area
  - Total: 12.7 km^{2} (4.9 sq mi)
- Elevation: 981 m (3,219 ft)

Population (31 December 2016)
  - Total: 62
  - Density: 4.9/km^{2} (13/sq mi)
- Demonym: Rondanelli
- Time zone: UTC+1 (CET)
  - Summer (DST): UTC+2 (CEST)
- Postal code: 16025
- Dialing code: 010
- Website: Official website

Rondanina (Ligurian: Rondaninn-a) is a comune (municipality) in the Metropolitan City of Genoa in the Italian region Liguria, located about 30 kilometres (19 mi) northeast of Genoa.

== See also ==
- Parco naturale regionale dell'Antola
