= Ronco Scrivia =

- Comune
- Comune di Ronco Scrivia
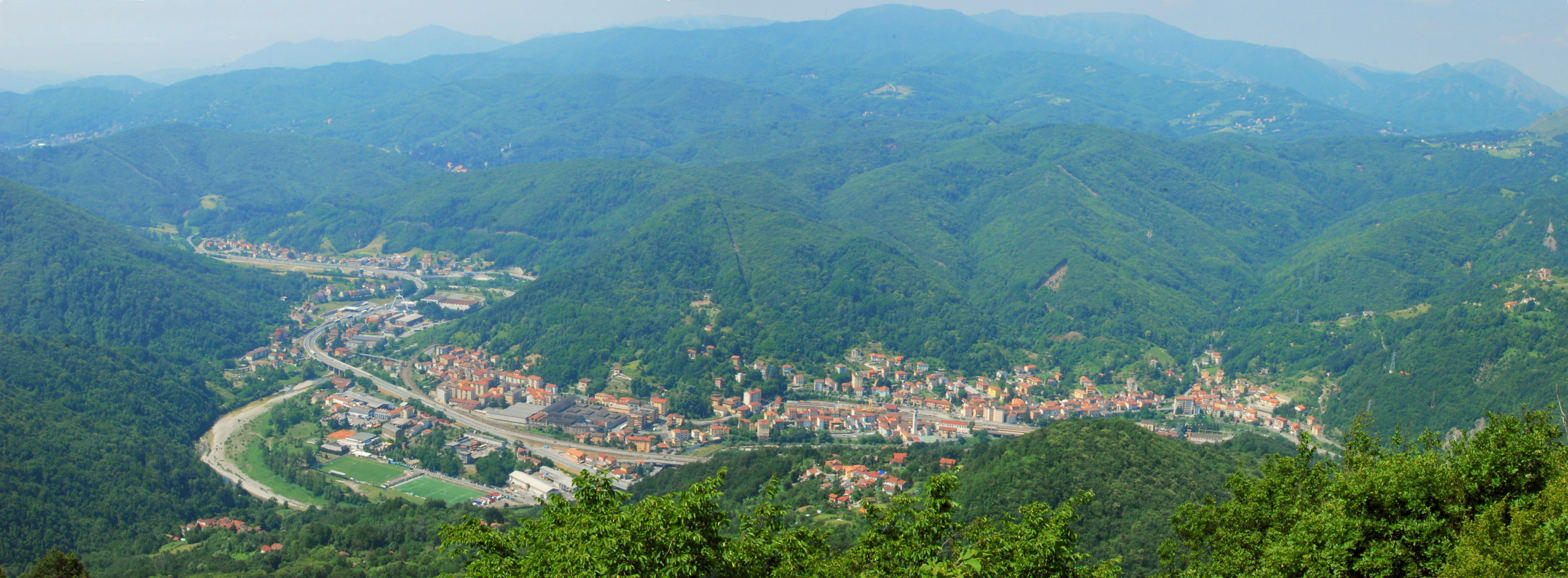
- Ronco Scrivia

- Coat of arms

- Location within Italy Location within Liguria
- Coordinates: 44°37′N 8°57′E
- Country: Italy
- Region: Liguria
- Metropolitan city: Genoa (GE)
- Frazioni: Banchetta, Borgo Fornari, Cascine, Chiappari, Cipollina, Costa Lazzari, Curlo, Giacoboni, Isolabuona, Malvasi, Minceto, Panigasse, Pietrafraccia, Porale, Tana d'Orso, Vallecalda

Government
  - Mayor: Rosa Olivieri

Area
  - Total: 30.5 km^{2} (11.8 sq mi)
- Elevation: 334 m (1,096 ft)

Population (31 December 2015)
  - Total: 4,417
  - Density: 145/km^{2} (375/sq mi)
- Demonym: Ronchesi
- Time zone: UTC+1 (CET)
  - Summer (DST): UTC+2 (CEST)
- Postal code: 16019
- Dialing code: 010
- Website: Official website

Ronco Scrivia (Ligurian: Ronco) is a comune (municipality) in the Metropolitan City of Genoa in the Italian region Liguria, located about 20 kilometres (12 mi) north of Genoa.

Ronco Scrivia borders the following municipalities: Busalla, Fraconalto, Isola del Cantone, Voltaggio.

== History ==
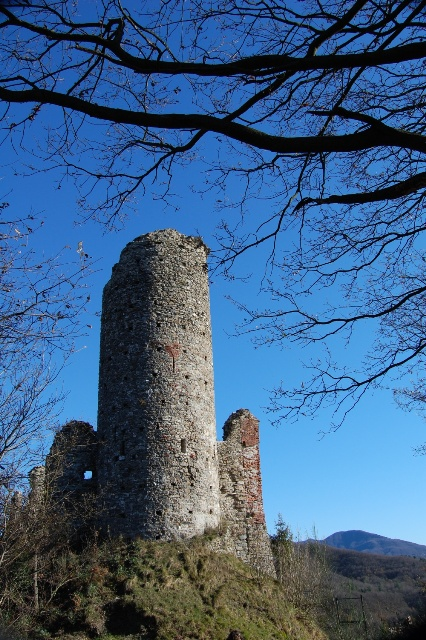
Tower of the Castle of Borgo Fornari

Ronco is mentioned for the first time in an 1127 document. It was held by the bishops of Tortona until the 13th century, and then by the Spinola family and later by the Republic of Genoa. Together with the whole Republic of Genoa, Ronco became part of the Kingdom of Sardinia in 1815.

Being a major railroad junction point between Genoa and Turin, it was heavily bombed by Allied planes during the late World War II.

== Main sights ==
- Parish church of San Martino (17th century). It houses canvasses by Orazio De Ferrari and Giovanni Lorenzo Bertolotto
- Parish church of Santa Maria Assunta (12th century, rebuilt in the 17th century), in the frazione of Borgo Fornari.
- Sanctuary of Madonna della Bastia
- Abbey of Santa Maria al Porale, in the eponymous frazione.
- Marquisses Palace, now housing the town hall
- Castle of Ronco Scrivia (11th-12th centuries), a former noble residence of the Spinola. Today only a few fragments remain of the original medieval fortress.
- Villa Davidson (1909-1910), a patrician villa in Borgo Fornari.
- Castle of Borgo Fornari (12th century). Now mostly in ruins, aside from a tower, it once commanded the road in the Valle Scrivia to the former Genoese fief of Voltaggio.

== See also ==
- Parco naturale regionale dell'Antola
