= Propata =

Propata Propâ
- Comune
- Comune di Propata
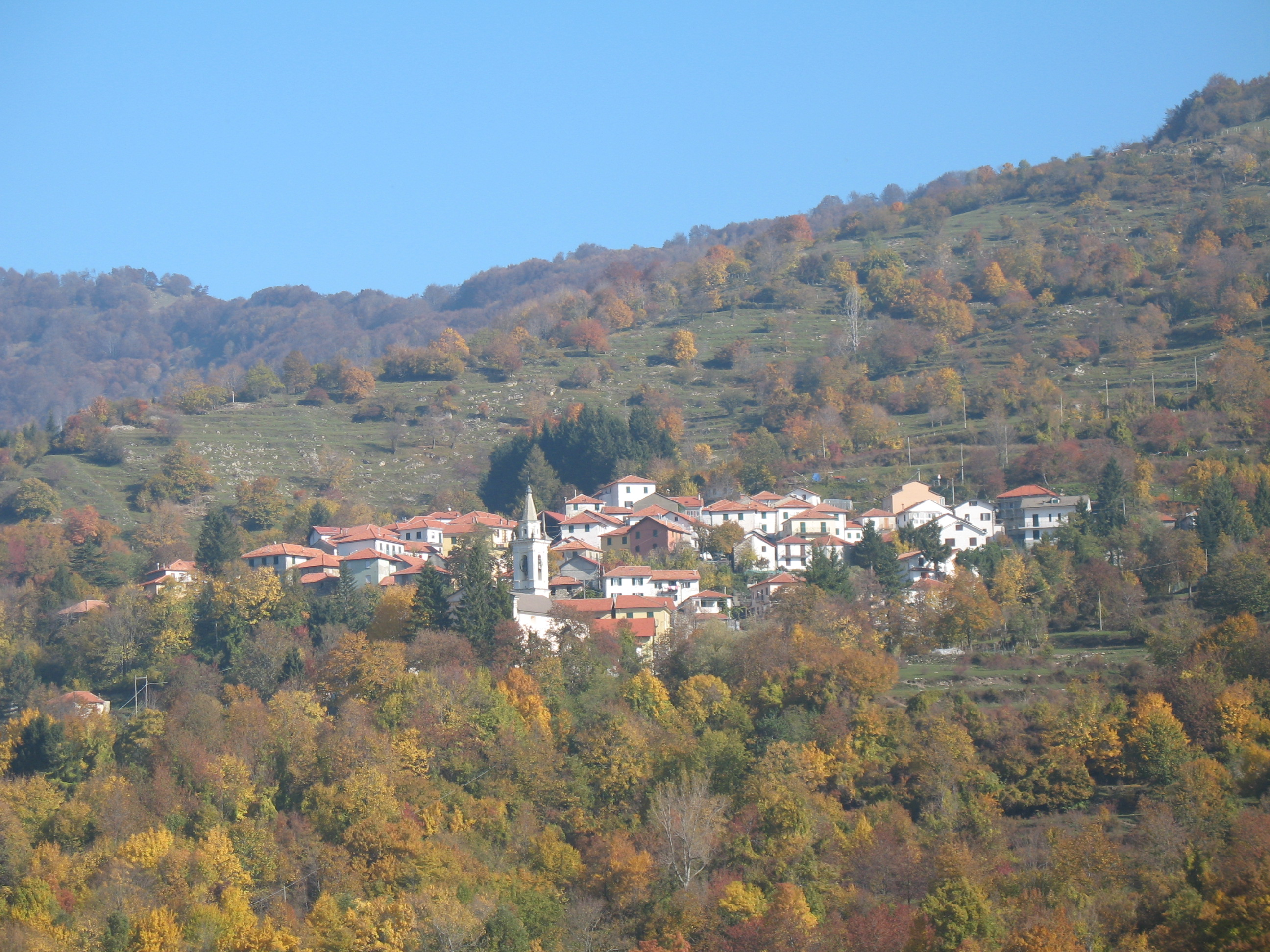

- Coat of arms

- Location within Italy Location within Liguria
- Coordinates: 44°34′N 9°11′E
- Country: Italy
- Region: Liguria
- Metropolitan city: Genoa (GE)
- Frazioni: Bavastrelli, Caffarena, Caprile

Government
  - Mayor: Sandra Della Rovere

Area
  - Total: 16.8 km^{2} (6.5 sq mi)
- Elevation: 990 m (3,250 ft)

Population (31 December 2008)
  - Total: 164
  - Density: 9.76/km^{2} (25.3/sq mi)
- Demonym: Propatesi
- Time zone: UTC+1 (CET)
  - Summer (DST): UTC+2 (CEST)
- Postal code: 16027
- Dialing code: 010
- Patron saint: St. Lawrence
- Saint day: 10 August

Propata (Ligurian: Propâ) is a comune (municipality) in the Metropolitan City of Genoa in the Italian region Liguria, located about 25 kilometres (16 mi) northeast of Genoa.

The parish church of St. Lawrence houses a wooden statue by Anton Maria Maragliano.

== See also ==
- Parco naturale regionale dell'Antola
