= Busalla =

- Comune
- Comune di Busalla
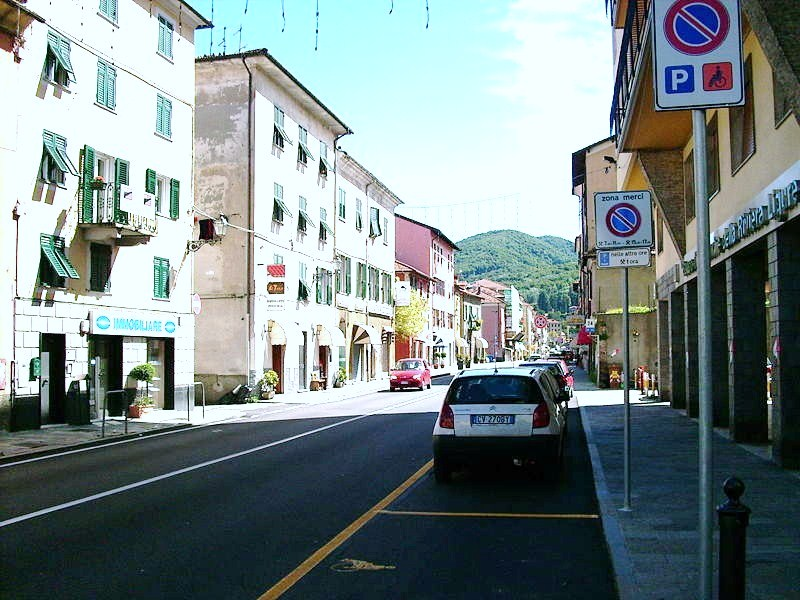

- Coat of arms

- Location within Italy Location within Liguria
- Coordinates: 44°34′N 8°57′E
- Country: Italy
- Region: Liguria
- Metropolitan city: Genoa (GE)
- Frazioni: Camarza, Sarissola, Inagea, Salvarezza

Government
  - Mayor: Loris Maieron

Area
  - Total: 17.1 km^{2} (6.6 sq mi)
- Elevation: 358 m (1,175 ft)

Population (30 April 2017)
  - Total: 5,546
  - Density: 324/km^{2} (840/sq mi)
- Demonym: Busallesi
- Time zone: UTC+1 (CET)
  - Summer (DST): UTC+2 (CEST)
- Postal code: 16012
- Dialing code: 010
- Website: Official website

Busalla is a comune (municipality) in the Metropolitan City of Genoa in the Italian region Liguria, located about 27 kilometres (17 mi) north of Genoa.

Its territory is crossed by the upper valley of the Scrivia river. Nearby is the artificial Lake Busalletta.

== History ==
The first known mention of Busalla is in an 1192 document. Later it is known to have been held by the Spinola family, who here built a castle. This was sacked several times in the following century, in the course of the Wars of Guelphs and Ghibellines.

In the 16th century the structure, again in ruins, was used as foundation of a new palace for the Spinola. Busalla became part of the Republic of Genoa in 1728. In 1815, together with the latter, it was acquired by the Kingdom of Sardinia.

== See also ==
- Parco naturale regionale dell'Antola
