= AMT Genova =

Transport company

- Industry: Public transport
- Founded: 1895 (named UITE)
- Headquarters: Italy
- Website: www.amt.genova.it

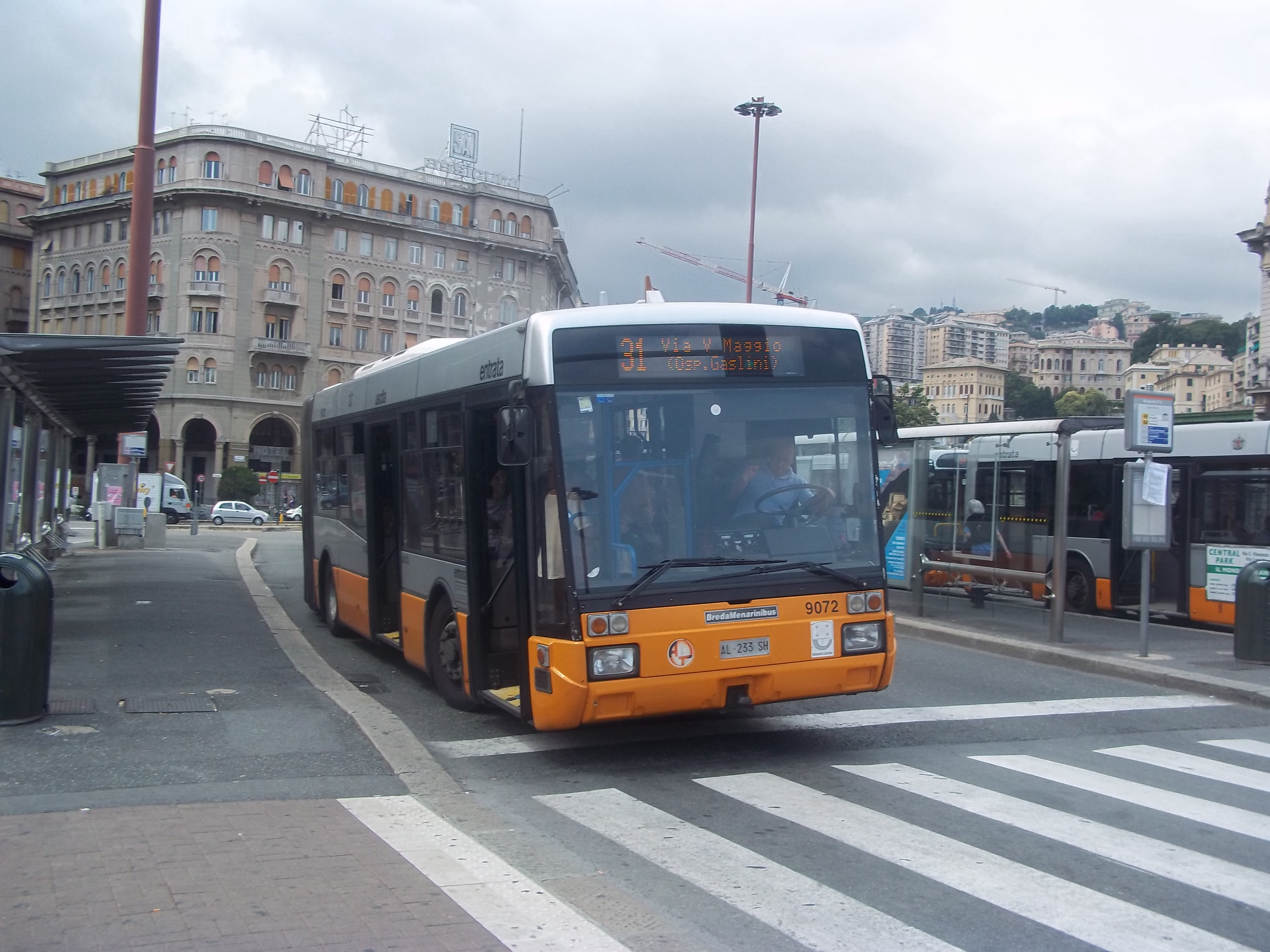
One of the AMT's urban buses

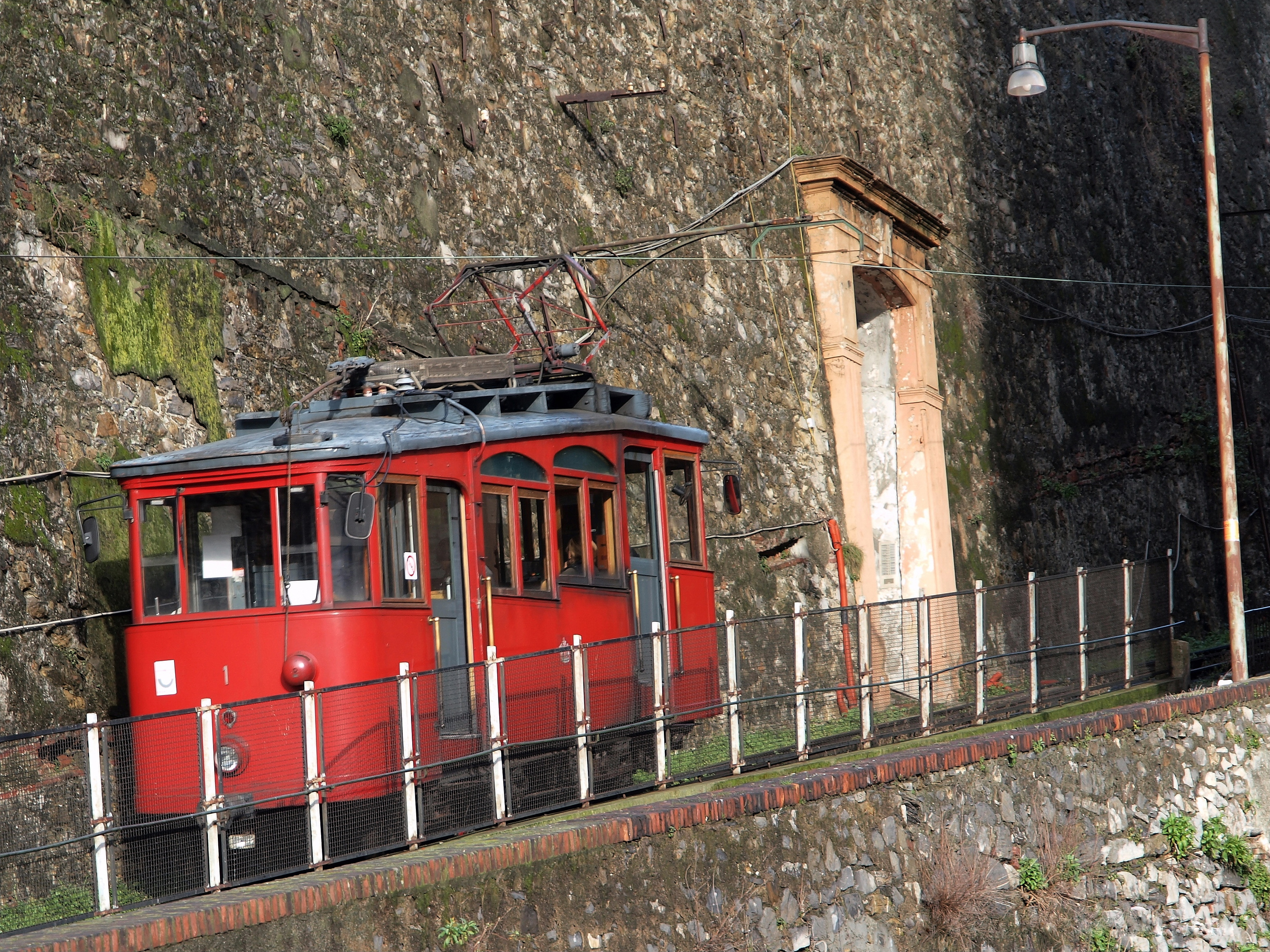
The Principe–Granarolo rack railway

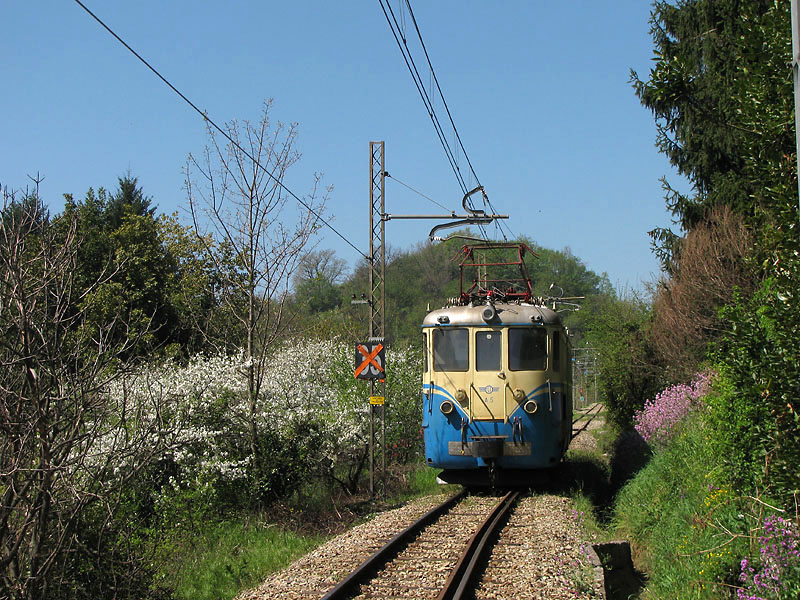
Train on the Genova–Casella railway

The AMT Genova, formally known as the Azienda Mobilità e Trasporti and formerly as the Azienda Municipalizzata Trasporti, is a joint stock company that holds the concession for public transport in the Italian city of Genoa.

== History ==
The first public transport in Genoa was provided by a horse-drawn omnibus service linking the city centre and Sampierdarena, that started in 1873. In 1878, the French company Compagnia Generale Francese dei Tramways (CGFT, French General Company of Tramways) began to build a horse tram system. The city subsequently granted further concessions to two other companies, the Swiss backed Società di Ferrovie Elettriche e Funicolari (FEF, Society of Electric Railways & Funiculars) and the Belgian/Italian Società Tramways Orientali (TO, Oriental Tramway Society). However, by 1894, the FEF had achieved no more than a single short electric tram line between Piazza Manin and Piazza Corvetto, whilst the TO had not progressed beyond the planning stage. The CGFT system had extended through the city and the Val Polcevera, but was still horse operated.

In 1894, the German company Allgemeine Elektrizitäts Gesellschaft (AEG, Common Electricity Company) bought both the FEF and TO companies. The following year AEG created the company Officine Electrical Genovesi (OEG, Genovese Electrical Office), which took over the city's existing electricity supply company, and the Società Unione Italiana Tramways Elettrici (UITE, Italian Electric Tramways Union), which purchased the CGFT's concession. By the end of 1895, AEG has a monopoly of both electricity supply and public transport provision in the city. Under their new ownership, the FEF and the TO developed a tram network of more than 53 km (33 mi) reaching Nervi and Prato, whilst UITE electrified their lines to Voltri and Pontedecimo. Finally in December 1901, AEG merged the FEF and TO into an enlarged UITE.

AEG continued to own and manage the UITE until the outbreak of World War I, in which Germany and Italy fought on different sides. In 1916, new shares were issued and subscribed for entirely by Italian entrepreneurs. In 1927, the city of Genoa acquired a majority share-holding in UITE. In 1965, the city acquired the remaining holding and the UITE's activities were transferred to the Azienda Municipalizzata Trasporti (AMT).

As of 1 January 2021, the merger between AMT and ATP Esercizio is going to take place, with AMT absorbing the staff, services and vehicles of ATP Esercizio.

== Services ==
The AMT manages the following services:

- 1 metro line (the Genoa Metro)
- 3 funiculars (the Zecca–Righi funicular, the Sant'Anna funicular and the Quezzi funicular)
- 1 rack railway (the Principe–Granarolo rack railway)
- 1 narrow gauge railway (the Genova–Casella railway)
- 10 public lifts, one of which is the Ascensore Castello d'Albertis-Montegalletto
- 139 urban bus lines
- 1 trolleybus line

== Bus and Trolleybus Routes ==
=== Routes 1-99 ===
- 1 Caricamento-Cornigliano-Sestri-Pegli-Prà-Voltri
- 1/ Caricamento-Cornigliano-Sestri-Pegli-Prà-Voltri
- 3 Stazione Principe-Sestri Via Soliman
- 5/ Sestri Via Menotti-Erzilli Polo Tecnologico
- 7 Via Fanti d'Italia-Via Brin-Via Gallino (Pontedecimo)
- 8 Sampierdarena Via Avio-Bolzaneto
- 8/ Sampierdarena Via Avio-Rivarolo Via Pallavicini
- 9 Caricamento-Brin-Bolzaneto-Pontedecimo
- 9/ Pontedecimo-Sampierdarena-Caricamento
- 13 Prato-Molassana-Brignole-Caricamento
- 13/ Prato-Gavette-Staglieno-Brignole-Caricamento
- 14 Prato-Molassana-Brignole
- 14/ Prato-Gavette-Staglieno
- 15 Nervi Viale Franchini-Albaro-Via Brigata Liguria
- 16 Quarto (Autostrada)-Corso Europa-Brignole
- 17/ Via Ceccardi-Corso Europa-Nervi Via del Commercio
- 18 Sampierdarena Via Degola-Pronto Soccorso San Martino
- 18/ Sampierdarena Via Degola-Ospedale San Martino
- 20 Foce Via Rimassa-Piazza De Ferrari-Principe-Piazza Vittorio Veneto (trolleybus)
- 20/ Sampierdarena-Principe-Brignole-Foce (trolleybus)
- 31 Stazione Brignole-Corso Italia-Sturla-Ospedale Gaslini
- 32 Largo San Francesco da Paola-Caricamento
- 34 Cimitero Staglieno-Piazza Manin-Stazione Principe
- 35 Ospedale Galliera-De Ferrari-Stazione Principe-Largo San Francesco da Paola
- 35/ Ospedale Galliera-De Ferrari-Stazione Principe-Via Vesuvio
- 36 Stazione Marittima-Circonvalmonte-Piazza Manin-Stazione Brignole-Piazza Merani
- 37 Marassi Via dei Platani-Brignole-Via Dante
- 38 Stazione Principe-Granarolo
- 39 Stazione Brignole-Oregina (Via Vesuvio)
- 40 Stazione Brignole-Oregina (Via Costanzi)
- 42 Via Isonzo-Via De Gasperi-Piazza De Ferrari
- 42/ Via Diaz-Via Isonzo
- 43 Stazione Brignole-Albaro-Ospedale San Martino
- 44 Piazza de Ferrari-San Martino-Borgoratti (full electric)
- 44/ Borgoratti-Corso Torino (full electric)
- 45 Stazione Brignole-San Martino-Sturla-Ospedale Gaslini
- 46 Via Donghi-Piazza De Ferrari-Via Donghi
- 47 Via Pinetti (Ascensore)-Brignole-Via Pinetti
- 48 Molassana-Pronto Soccorso San Martino
- 48/ Pronto Soccorso San Martino-Cimitero Staglieno
- 49 Via delle Ginestre-Corso Montegrappa-Stazione Brignole
- 49/ Stazione Brignole-Largo Giardino
- 49/ Via delle Ginestre-Via Montaldo-Gavette
- 51 Sestri Via Biancheri-Via Rollino
- 51/ Via Rollino-Sestri
- 52 Sestri Via Biancheri-Via Sant'Alberto-Cimitero Sestri
- 52/ Sestri Via Merano-Cimitero Sestri
- 53 Rivarolo Piazza Pallavicini-Borzoli-Sestri Via Travi
- 53/ Borzoli-Sestri
- 54 Stazione Principe-Via del Lagaccio
- 57 Chiesa di Santa Maria del Garbo-Piazza Pallavicini
- 57/ Piazza Pallavicini-Rivarolo Cimitero-Chiesa di Santa Maria del Garbo
- 59 Via dei Landi-Via Cantore-Via B. Powell-Belvedere
- 59/ Via dei Landi-Piazza Montano-Belvedere
- 62 Sampierdarena Via Avio-Coronata-Testa di Cavallo
- 62/ Sampierdarena Via Avio-Coronata Cimitero
- 63 Sampierdarena Via Avio-Corso Perrone-Pontedecimo (Via Anfossi-Stazione FS)
- 63/ Sampierdarena Via Avio-Corso Perrone-via Artigiani-Pontedecimo (Via Anfossi-Stazione FS)
- 64 Piazza Manin-Righi-Oregina
- 64/ Piazza Manin-Righi (Funicolare)
- 65 Cesino-Pontedecimo-San Cipriano
- 65/ Cesino-Pontedecimo (Gallino)-San Cipriano
- 66 Via Milano-Cimitero Castagna-Piazza Montano
- 67 Piazza Martinez-Via Berghini-Camaldoli
- 67/ Camaldoli-Piazza Giusti
- 71 Pegli Piazza Rapisarda-Via Carperana-San Carlo di Cese
- 71/ Pegli FS-San Carlo di Cese
- 74 Bolzaneto FS-Chiesa di Murta
- 82 Stazione Brignole-Chiesa di Quezzi
- 82/ Chiesa di Quezzi-Via Fereggiano
- 84 Stazione Brignole-Piazza Martinez-Via Amarena
- 84/ Stazione Brignole-Via Solari
- 85 Chiesa di Bavari-Borgoratti-Brignole
- 85/ Corso Buenos Aires-Borgoratti-Bavari
- 86 San Desiderio-Borgoratti-Brignole
- 86/ San Desiderio-Borgoratti
- 87 Apparizione (Cimitero)-Borgoratti-Stazione Brignole
- 88 / 88/ San Desiderio-Borgoratti-Apparizione
- 89 Piazza Martinez-Via Giovanni XXIII
- 93 Pegli FS-Via Vespucci
- 94 Via Stassano-Via Diano Marina-Prà FS
- 96 Voltri Via Don Verità-Crevari
- 97 Voltri Via Don Verità-Fiorino
- 97/ Voltri Via Don Verità-Località Fabbriche

=== Routes 100-199 ===
- 101 Voltri Via Don Verità-Acquasanta FS
- 101/ Voltri Via Don Verità-Acquasanta Santuario
- 128 Erzelli-Piazza Baracca-Piazza di Vittorio
- 128/ Erzelli-Sestri-Piazza di Vittorio
- 151 Sestri Via Biancheri-Viale Villa Gavotti
- 151/ Sestri-Viale Villa Gavotti
- 158 Piazza Consigliere-Ospedale Micone-Piazza Baracca-Piazza Consigliere
- 158/ Sestri-Piazza Consigliere
- 159 Piazza Consigliere-Piazza Baracca-Ospedale Micone-Piazza Consigliere
- 159/ Sestri-Piazza Consigliere
- 160/ Via dei Sessanta-Via Rolla
- 160/ Via dei Sessanta-Cornigliano
- 165 Piazza Montano-Via Fanti-Piazza Montano
- 170 Sestri Via Travi-Piazza Virgo Potens
- 172 Sestri Piazza Baracca-Panigaro
- 172/ Sestri-Panigaro
- 188 Prà FS-Via Pavese
- 189 Pegli FS-Quartiere Giardino
- 189/ Pegli FS-Via Lorenzini-Quartiere Giardino
- 190 Pegli FS-Via Lariosa-Via Ungaretti
- 192 Voltri FS-Via M. Turchino-Via Salvemini-Via 2 Dicembre
- 193 Voltri Via Don Verità-Ospedale San Carlo-Via Montanella
- 199 Voltri FS-Via M. Turchino-Via Calamandrei-Via Don Verità
- 199/ Via S. Sulfuree-Via Salvemini-Via Calamandrei-Via Don Verità

=== Routes 200-299 ===
- 270 Brin Metro-Via Linneo-Bolzaneto Via Reta
- 270/ Bolzaneto-Via Maritano-Rivarolo Piazza Pallavicini Brin Metro
- 272 Rivarolo Piazza Pallavicini-Via Cambiaso-Begato
- 272/ Rivarolo Piazza Pallavicini-Via Brocchi
- 273 Rivarolo Piazza Pallavicini-Via delle Tofane
- 275 Bolzaneto-Chiesa di Geminiano-Campora
- 275/ Bolzaneto-Chiesa di Geminiano
- 276 Bolzaneto-Morego-San Biagio
- 277 Bolzaneto-Chiesa di Cremeno

=== Routes 300-399 ===
- 340 Piazza Dinegro-Via Asilo Garbarino
- 355 Via Spallanzani (San Teodoro)-Fregoso
- 355/ Via Spallanzani-Via Bianco
- 355/ Granarolo-Fregoso
- 356 Stazione Brignole-Via Fea (Biscione)
- 356/ Via Fea-Via Fereggiano
- 374 Spianata Castelletto-Via Cancelliere
- 375 Spianata Castelletto-Via Chiodo
- 377 Spianata Castelletto-Via Ausonia
- 381 Via Monticelli-Via Biga
- 383 Via Monticelli-Via Robino
- 385 Via Torti-Via Imperiale
- 385/ Piazza Martinez-Via Imperiale

=== Routes 400-499 ===
- 451 Via Bobbio-Via Tortona
- 451/ Cimitero Staglieno-Via Tortona
- 470 San Martino di Struppa-Bavari-Sant'Eusebio
- 470/ Molassana-Sant'Eusebio
- 470/ Molassana-San Martino di Struppa
- 474 Piazzale Bligny-Via Terpi-Via Lodi-Preli
- 474/ Preli-Via Lodi
- 474/ San Sebastiano-Piazzale Bligny
- 477 Molassana-Via Geirato-Cartagenova
- 477/ Molassana-Via Geirato-Castello di Pino-Cartagenova
- 479 Molassana-San Martino di Struppa
- 480 Stazione Brignole-Via Mogadiscio-Sant'Eusebio
- 480/ Sant'Eusebio-Piazzale Bligny-Cimitero Staglieno
- 481 Molassana (Via Geirato)-Pino Superiore (Località Torrazza)
- 482 Stazione Brignole-Via Valtrebbia-Sant'Eusebio
- 482/ Sant'Eusebio-Cimitero Staglieno

=== Routes 500-599 ===
- 512 Piazza Ragazzi del 99-Via degli Iris
- 512/ Piazza Ragazzi del 99-Via Anemoni-Via degli Iris
- 513 Piazza Ragazzi del 99-Colle degli Ometti-Via Nenni
- 515 Nervi Viale Franchini-Via Oberdan-Via Somma-Quinto Piazza Rusca
- 515/ Nervi Viale Franchini-Nervi Largo Edilio Pesce
- 516 Nervi-Sant'Ilario
- 517 Nervi-Cimitero Nervi-Capolungo
- 518 Internal Route of Ospedale San Martino (Ingresso-Maragliano)
- 518/ Internal Route of Ospedale San Martino (Dermatologia Sociale-Istituto Sud)
- 584 Via V Maggio (Ospedale Gaslini)-Chiesa di Bavari
- 584/ Via V Maggio (Ospedale Gaslini)-Via Cadighiara

=== Routes 600-699 ===
- 603 Stazione Brignole-Via Monticelli-Largo Merlo-Chiesa di Quezzi
- 603/ Chiesa di Quezzi-Via Fereggiano
- 604 Stazione Brignole-Via Berghini-Camaldoli
- 606 Boccadasse-Tommaseo-Manin-Stazione Principe
- 607 Nervi-Corso Italia-De Ferrari-Stazione Brignole
- 607/ Nervi-Corso Italia-Stazione Brignole
- 617 Capolungo-Corso Europa-Piazza Dante-Stazione Brignole
- 617/ Capolungo-Stazione Brignole
- 618 Sampierdarena Via Degola-De Ferrari-Pronto Soccorso San Martino
- 634 Cimitero Staglieno-Manin-Largo Zecca-Stazione Principe
- 635 Via Vannucci-Largo San Francesco da Paola-Dinegro-Caricamento
- 635/ Caricamento-Dinegro-Largo San Francesco da Paola-De Ferrari
- 640 Brignole-Piazza della Nunziata-Via Vesuvio-Via Costanzi (Righi)
- 641 Ospedale Gaslini-Via Orsini-Albaro-De Ferrari-Principe
- 641/ Ospedale Gaslini-Via Orsini-Albaro-Corso Buenos Aires
- 649 Via delle Ginestre-Corso Montegrappa-Stazione Brignole
- 653 Sestri Via Travi-Piazza Consigliere-Via Borzoli-Rivarolo
- 656 Stazione Brignole-Via Fea
- 656/ Via Fea-Piazza Giusti
- 660 Via Milano-Cimitero Castagna-Piazza Montano
- 663 Sampierdarena Via Avio-Coronata-Corso Perrone-Pontedecimo
- 663/ Pontedecimo-Corso Perrone-Cornigliano
- 670 Brin Metro-Via Linneo-Bolzaneto Via Reta
- 680 Stazione Brignole-Corso de Stefanis-Via Mogadiscio-Sant'Eusebio
- 680/ Sant'Eusebio-Cimitero Staglieno
- 683 Stazione Brignole-Via dei Platani-Via Robino-Via Biga-Stazione Brignole
- 683/ Via Robino-Via Biga-Piazza Martinez
- 685 Chiesa di Bavari-Borgoratti-De Ferrari-Stazione Brignole
- 685/ Chiesa di Bavari-Corso Buenos Aires
- 686 San Desiderio-Borgoratti-De Ferrari-Stazione Brignole
- 686/ San Desiderio-Corso Buenos Aires
- 687 Apparizione-Borgoratti-De Ferrari-Stazione Brignole
- 687/ Apparizione-Corso Buenos Aires
- 697 Via Verità-Crevari-Via Fiorino-Via Montanella
- 699 Voltri-Via Calamandrei-Via Novella-Via 2 Dicembre-Via Sorgenti Sulfuree-Voltri
- 699/ Via 2 Dicembre-Via Sorgenti Sulfuree

=== Night Bus Routes ===
- N1 Pontedecimo-De Ferrari-Prato
- N1/ Pontedecimo-Sampierdarena-Brignole-Prato
- N2 Voltri-De Ferrari-Nervi
- N2/ Voltri-Sampierdarena-Stazione Brignole

=== Other Urban Routes ===
- Genova-Casella railway bus replacement service
- Magenta Crocco lift replacement service
- AIR Sestri FS (Passerella Via Cibrario)-Sestri Aeroporto (Arrivi)
- BM Servizio Stadio
- CB Borgoratti-Cimitero Staglieno
- CK Staglieno (Piazzale Resasco)-Piazza Verdi (Brignole)
- CM Servizio Stadio
- CN San Niccolò-Cimitero Staglieno
- CR Rivarolo (Via Rossini)-Via Vezzani (Ciimitero Rivarolo)
- CS Monumental Cemetery of Staglieno's internal service
- DrinBus: this service is a demand responsive mode of transport where people call AMT to book a place on a dedicated bus in the boroughs of Pegli, Bolzaneto, Morengo, Cremeno, San Biagio, Quarto, Quinto and Molassana
- F1 Piazza Bandiera-Corso Firenze-Oregina-Righi (funicolare) (replacement bus service for the Zecca-Righi funicular)
- F2 Via Chiodo (S.Simone)-Via Piaggio-Corso Carbonara-Piazza Bandiera (replacement bus service for the Zecca-Righi funicular)
- F2/ Righi (Funicolare)-Via Carso-Piazza Manin-Piazza Bandiera (replacement bus service for the Zecca-Righi funicular)
- G1 San Teodoro (Via Spallanzani)-Granarolo (Via Bianco) (replacement bus service for the Principe-Granarolo rack railway)
- GA Sestri Via Bianchieri-Via Rollino-Santuario del Gazzo
- HP Service for people with disabilities
- HS Via Cantore-Ospedale Scassi (replacement bus service for the Villa Scassi Lift)
- KM Servizio Stadio
- SC Sturla-Cimitero Staglieno
- SM Servizio Stadio
- I01 Prà FS-Via Sup. Della Torrazza-Via Villini Negrone
- I02 Sestri Via Travi-Via Calda
- I03 Via Canepari-Via S. Piombelli
- I04 Brin Metrò-Via Mansueto
- I06 Piazza Masnata-Via del Campasso-Via Spaventa-Piazza Masnata
- I09 Via Linneo-Via Ravel-Via Fermi-Via Linneo
- I10 Via Buozzi (Dinegro Metrò)-Via P. Doria-Via Ceppi
- I13 Piazzale Resasco (Cimitero Staglieno)-Via delle Banchelle
- I14 Piazzale Resasco (Cimitero Staglieno)-Sant'Antonino)
- I15 Doria-Bavari-Sant'Eusebio
- I15/ Sant'Eusebio-Costa di Sant'Eusebio
- I17 Via Borgoratti-Via Sapeto-Via Minoretti
- I19 Via Borgoratti-Via Copernico
- I21 Via De Vincenzi-Via Spalato-Via Merello-Via De Vincenzi
- I21/ Via de Vincenzi-Via Olivo (cimitero)
- I22 Largo Merlo-Via Edera-Poligono di Quezzi
- I24 Marina Aeroporto-Sestri FS Via Puccini
- I25 Piazza Garrassini-Via Monte Rosa
- I27 Doria Via Struppa-San Siro di Struppa-Aggio
- VLB Staz.Brignole-Aeroporto C.Colombo

== Interurban Routes ==
Since the 1st January 2021, AMT started to operate also various interurban Routes, following ATP Esercizio's merging into AMT becoming effective. This interurban branch of AMT is known as AMT Extra

=== Interurban Routes ===
==== A-Z ====
- A:
  - A AR-CA Arenzano-Cantarena
  - A AR-CO Genova Voltri-Arenzano-Terralba-Roccolo-Val Lerone-Cogoleto
  - A AR-TE Terrarossa-Arenzano-Voltri
  - A CO-BE Cogoleto-Beuca
  - A CO-CA Cogoleto-Capieso
  - A CO-LE Cogoleto-Capieso-Lerca
  - A CO-SC Cogoleto-Schivà-Sciarborasca-Pratozanino
  - A SC-VO Cogoleto-Sciarborasca-Arenzano-Genova Voltri
- Chiamabus Recco (demand responsive service connecting Recco with some outer localities in its municipal boundaries)
- C2 Free Circular Bus Route Chiavari (Piazzale Roma-Via Preli-Ospedale)
- E:
  - E BO-SE Genova Bolzaneto-Pedemonte-Valleregia-Serra
  - E CAMPI Genova Staglieno-Tresasco-Campi
  - E PE-CA Genova Bolzaneto-Pedemonte-Casella
  - E PE-SE Pedemonte-San Cipriano-Serra
  - E PI-CO Picarello-Manesseno-Comago
- F:
  - F BU-MO Busalla-Ponte Savignone-Casella-Avosso-Montoggio
  - F BU-SA Busalla-Ponte Savignone-Savignone
  - F GIOVI Genova Pontedecimo-Mignanego-Passo dei Giovi-Busalla-Ronco Scrivia
  - F MIGNANEGO Genova Pontedecimo-Mignanego-Paveto-Fumeri
  - F VALBREVENNA Casella-Ponte Savignone-Sorrivi-Nenno-Casella-Valbrevenna-Molino Vecchio
- Free CityBus Rapallo
- H:
  - H CRAVASCO Genova Pontedecimo-Campomorone-Isoverde-Cravasco
  - H GAIAZZA Genova Pontedecimo-Campomorone-Gaiazza-Sareto
- RECCO 1 Recco Centro-Mulineti Cimitero (demand responsive service)
- RECCO 2 Recco-Polanesi-Monte Fiorito
- S:
  - S BERNARDO Bogliasco-Poggio-San Bernardo
  - S BO-PI Bogliasco-Pieve Alta-Sori
  - S SESSAREGO Bogliasco-Sessarego
  - S SO-AP Sori-Rupanego-Sant'Apollinare
  - S SO-LE Sori-Sussisa-Levà
  - S SO-LE Sori-Via Solimano-Teriasca
- T:
  - T Genova-Corso Europa-Recco
  - T RE-GA Recco-Uscio-Colle Caprile-Lumarzo-Tribogna-Gattorna-Ferrada
  - T RE-SE Recco-Testana-Serro

==== 1-99 ====
- 1A Genova Brignole-Prà-A26-Masone-Campo Ligure-Rossiglione-Tiglieto-Vara Superiore
- 1C Masone-Campo Ligure
- 1M Masone-Campo Ligure-Rossiglione
- 2 Chiavari FS-Piazzale Rocca-San Bartolomeo-Sampierdicanne-Chiavari FS
- 2B Chiavari FS-Piazzale Rocca-San Bartolomeo-Bocco-Camposacco-Villa Oneri
- 2D Chiavari FS-Piazzale Rocca-Ri Alto (Chiesa)
- 2S Chiavari FS-Piazzale Rocca-San Bartolomeo
- 3 Chiavari-Lavagna Ospedale-San Salvatore-Conscenti
- 4 Chiavari-Sestri Levante-Riva Trigoso
- 4S Chiavari-Lavagna-Sestri Levante-Riva Trigoso
- 5 Chiavari-Lavagna-Sestri Levante-Casarza Ligure-Battilana
- 6 Chiavari FS-Sampierdicanne-San Bartolomeo-Piazzale Rocca-Chiavari FS
- 6B Chiavari FS-Leivi-Camposacco-Bocco-Ri Alto
- 7 San Pietro/Santa Maria-Rapallo FS-Santa Margherita Ligure-Campo Sportivo
- 7F San Pietro/Santa Maria-Rapallo FS-Santa Margherita Ligure
- 7H Santa Margherita Ligure FS-Rapallo FS-Ospedale
- 7M Campo Sportivo-Santa Margherita Ligure-Rapallo FS-Santa Maria
- 7P Campo Sportivo-Santa Margherita Ligure-Rapallo FS-San Pietro
- 7R San Pietro/Santa Maria-Rapallo FS
- 7V San Pietro/Santa Maria-Rapallo FS-Santa Margherita Ligure Via Doria
- 8A Genova Voltri-Arenzano-Cogoleto-Varazze
- 9 Chiavari-Zoagli (Aurelia)-Rapallo FS
- 9F Genova-A7-Busalla-Casella-Montoggio
- 10 Chiavari-Sampierdicanne-Campodonico
- 10T Chiavari-San Terenziano-Campodonico
- 11 Chiavari-Borzonasca-Rezzoaglio-Santo Stefano d'Aveto
- 11B Santo Stefano d'Aveto-Rezzoaglio-Carasco
- 11S Chiavari-Scoglina-Rezzoaglio-Santo Stefano d'Aveto
- 12/12B/12N Chiavari-Borzonasca-Belvedere
- 12C Belvedere-Borzonasca-Carasco
- 12M Carasco-Mezzanego-Borzonasca
- 13 Calvari-Carasco-Caperana-Chiavari FS-Rostio
- 13T Chiavari FS-Rostio-San Terenziano
- 14/14C Chiavari FS-Villagrande di Cichero-Ferreccio
- 15 Genova-Bargagli-Gattorna-Cicagna-Calvari-Chiavari
- 15B Chiavari-Monleone-Ferrada-Gattorna-Bargagli
- 15C Genova-Bargagli-Gattorna-Chiavari-Carasco
- 16 Carasco-Isolona-Orero-Cicagna-Ferrada
- 17 Ferrada-Gattorna-Neirone-Roccatagliata
- 18 Ferrada-Cicagna-Lorsica-Favale di Malvaro
- 19 Ferrada-Gattorna-Ognio-San Marco d'Urri
- 21 Chiavari FS-Sant'Andrea di Rovereto-San Pietro di Zoagli
- 22 Genova Prato-La Presa-Terrusso-Cisiano
- 24 Genova-Traso-Bargagli-Sant'Alberto-Maxena
- 25 Genova Brignole-Bargagli-Torriglia
- 25 FONTANIGORDA Torriglia-Montebruno-Fontanigorda-Rovegno
- 25 M1-2 Genova-Creto-Montoggio-Laccio-Torriglia
- 25 OTTONE Genova-Bargagli-Torriglia-Montebruno-Gorreto-Ottone
- 25 PROPATA Torriglia-Caprile-Propata-Rondanina-Diga Brugeto
- 26 Genova-Davagna-Scoffera-Torriglia
- 27 Genova Prato-Calvari-Marsiglia
- 31 Calvari-Carasco-San Salvatore-Lavagna Ospedale-Chiavari FS-Rostio
- 34 Chiavari-Graveglia-Conscenti-Statale-Arzeno
- 35 Genova Bolzaneto-Pedemonte
- 36 Genova Pontedecimo FS-Campomorone-Isolaverde
- 36C Genova Pontedecimo FS-Campomorone-Ponte Ferriera
- 37 Genova Bolzaneto-Piccarello-Sant'Olcese
- 37C Genova Bolzaneto-Piccarello-Casanova
- 37P Genova Bolzaneto-Piccarello
- 38 Genova Pontedecimo FS-Pietralavezzara
- 38C Campomorone-Pietralavezzara
- 40 Sestri Levante-Riva Trigoso-Sestri Levante
- 41 Sestri Levante-Trigoso-Bracco-Ca' Marcone
- 41CA Spiaggie di Sestri Levante-Parcheggio Powell-San Bartolomeo-Spiaggie di Riva Trigoso-Campeggio del Bracco (Summer Only)
- 42 Sestri Levante-Moneglia-Bracco-Ca' Marcone
- 43 Sestri Levante-Deiva Marina-Castagnola-Framura
- 43C/43D Sestri Levante-Deiva Marina-Castagnola-Costa di Framura
- 43CA Passano-Campeggi-Deiva Marina (Summer Only)
- 44 Moneglia-Lemeglio
- 45 Chiavari-Sestri Levante-Riva Trigoso-Battilana
- 46 Lavagna-Santa Giulia-Barasso-Cavi
- 47 Ca' di Lazzino-Castagnola-Levanto
- 47M Montaretto-Levanto
- 48 Moneglia-Deiva Marina-Mezzema
- 49 Castagnola-Bonassola-Levanto
- 50 Sestri Levante FS-Castiglione-Torza-San Pietro Vara-Varese Ligure
- 52 Carro-Missano Mereta-Maissana-Varese Ligure
- 55 Sestri Levante FS-Casarza Ligure-Bargone-Costa di Bargone
- 61 Sestri Levante-Santa Vittoria-Libiola-Montedomenico
- 61CA Campeggio Fossa Lupara-Sestri Levante FS-San Bartolomeo-Spiaggie di Riva Trigoso-Campeggio Fossa Lupara (Summer Only)
- 64 Sestri Levante-San Bernardo-Cascine-Loto-Azaro-Santa Vittoria
- 70 Rapallo-Ruta-Recco
- 71 Rapallo-Santa Margherita Ligure-Ruta-Camogli-Recco
- 73 Santa Margherita Ligure-Ruta-Camogli-Recco
- 73S Camogli Town Service
- 75T Genova-Corso Europa-Recco-Rapallo FS
- 76 Recco-Uscio-Colle Caprile
- 76T Genova-Corso Europa-Recco-Uscio-Colle Caprile
- 77 Quartiere degli Ulivi-Santa Margherita Ligure-Nozarego
- 80 Rapallo-San Martino- Rita
- 82 Santa Margherita Ligure FS-Paraggi-Portofino
- 83 Rapallo-San Massimo
- 84 Rapallo FS-Savagna
- 85/85 87F Rapallo FS-Arboccò-Chignero
- 87 Rapallo FS-Sellano-San Quirico-Montepegli
- 89 Rapallo FS-Via Laggiaro-Via delle Balze
- 89L Rapallo FS-Via delle Balze-Via Lande-Cimitero
- 90 Rapallo FS-Zoagli Centro
- 91 Rapallo FS-Sant'Agostino-Via Lande
- 92 Rapallo FS-Montallegro
- 93 Rapallo FS-Costasecca
- 95 Rapallo-Mexi-Sant'Ambrogio-Rapallo
- 96 Rapallo-Mexi-Sant'Ambrogio-Zoagli
- 97 Zoagli-Semorile
- 98/98C Santa Margherita Ligure-Rapallo-San Pietro-Lavagna-Sestri Levante-Bargonasco

==== 100-199 ====
- 101 Carasco-Rivarola-Caperana
- 101C Groppo-Masone-Campo Ligure-Rossiglione
- 102C Genova Voltri-Mele-Biscaccia
- 102F Busalla-Crocefieschi-Vobbia-Vallenzona
- 103F Busalla-Ronco Scrivia-Isola del Cantone-Vobbia
- 111 Rezzoaglio-Alpepiana-Vicosoprano
- 112 Rezzoaglio-Priosa-Sbarbari
- 113 Rezzoaglio-Ertola-Casaleggio
- 114 Borzonasca-Camponi-Temossi
- 116 Borzonasca-Caregli
- 117 Borzonasca-Levaggi-Belpiano-Acero
- 122 Mezzanego-Borzonasca-Borzone
- 126/126M Carasco-Borgonovo-Montemoggio-Passo del Blocco
- 127 Mezzanego-Val Carnella-Vignolo
- 128 Mezzanego-Porciletto
- 161 Cicagna-Canevale-Coreglia Ligure
- 180 Monleone-Lorsica-Verzi-Trino-Cassottana-Cicagna
- 182 Cicagna-Quartaie-Serra Riccò
- 183 Gattorna-Quartaie-Cornia
- 191 Ferrada-Gattorna-Moconesi Alto

==== 300-399 ====
- 330 Genova Pontedecimo-Campomorone-San Martino Paravanico-Caffarella
- 331 Genova Bolzaneto FS-Canonero-Livellato
- 332 Genova Bolzaneto FS-Geo-Santuario della Guardia

==== 400-499 ====
- 424 Moneglia-San Saturnino-Bracco-Ca' Marcone-Crova-Casale-Moneglia
- 441 Moneglia-Comeglio-Littorno
- 442 Moneglia-Casale-Crova
- 444 Moneglia-Casale-Crova-Ca' Marcone-Bracco-San Saturnino-Moneglia

==== 700-799 ====
- 701 Rossiglione-Campoligure-Masone-Mele-Voltri
- 702 Rossiglione-Campoligure-Masone-A26-Pegli-Genova Brignole
- 703 Chiavari FS-Lavagna Osp.-S.Salvatore-Conscenti
- 708 Varazze-Cogoleto-Arenzano-Voltri
- 711 Chiavari-Borzonasca-Rezzoaglio-S.Stefano d'Aveto
- 712 Chiavari-Borzonasca
- 713 Rostio-Chiavari FS-Caperana-Carasco
- 715 Chiavari FS-Gattorna-Ferriere-Genova
- 725 Torriglia-Bargagli-Genova Brignole
- 726 Torriglia-Laccio-Davagna-Prato
- 727 Genova-Sampierdarena-A7-Busalla-Bromia
- 728 Genova-Creto-Montoggio-Morasco-Bromia
- 730 Pontedecimo-Busalla
- 731 Chiavari FS-Lavagna Osp.-S.Salvatore-Carasco I Leudi
- 735 Bolzaneto-Pedemonte
- 736 Pontedecimo-Isoverde-Cravasco
- 737 Bolzaneto-Piccarello-Casanova
- 738 Bolzaneto-Piccarello-S.Olcese
- 740 Busalla FS-Savignone-Casella-Avosso-Montoggio-Bromia
- 750 Sestri Levante FS-Castiglione Ch.-Torza-S.Pietro Vara-Varese Ligure
- 772 Recco-Megli-Polanesi-Montefiorito-Recco
- 773 S.Margherita L.-Ruta-Camogli-Recco
- 774 Recco-Genova
- 775 Rapallo-Ruta-Recco-Genova
- 776 Colle Caprile-Uscio-Recco-Genova

==== 800-899 ====
- 802 Chiavari-piazzale Rocca-S.Bartolomeo-Sampierdicanne-Chiavari
- 803 Voltri FS-Mele-Fado
- 805 Cogoleto FS-Capieso-Cogoleto FS
- 806 Chiavari-Sampierdicanne-S.Bartolomeo-piazzale Rocca-Chiavari
- 807 Cogoleto FS-Lerca-Cogoleto FS
- 808 Arenzano-Terralba-Ospedale-Roccolo-Vallerone
- 809 Arenzano-Terrarossa
- 810 Chiavari FS-Campodonico
- 811 Cogoleto FS-Pratozanino-Sciarborasca-Schivà-Cogoleto FS
- 812 Borzonasca-Belvedere
- 813 Cogoleto FS-Schivà-Sciarborasca-Pratozanino-Cogoleto FS
- 814 Chiavari FS-Villagrande di Cichero-Ferreccio
- 820 Genova Staglieno-Campi
- 822 Busalla-Savignone
- 824 Traso ponte-Traso centro-Traso alto-S.Alberto-Bargagli
- 825 Busalla-Crocefieschi-Vobbia-Vallenzona
- 826 Carasco-Montemoggio-Borzonasca
- 828 Chiavari-piazzale Rocca–S.Bartolomeo-Bocco–Camposasco-Villa Oneto-Sampierdicanne–Chiavari
- 830 Busalla-Borgofornari-Ronco Scrivia-Isola del Cantone
- 831 Prato-Marsiglia
- 833 Pontedecimo-Ceranesi-Gaiazza-Sareto
- 834 Pontedecimo-S.Martino di Paravanico-Caffarella
- 835 Bolzaneto-Livellato
- 836 Bolzaneto-Pedemonte-Serra Riccò-Valleregia
- 837 Pontedecimo-Paveto
- 838 Pontedecimo-Pietralavezzara
- 839 Pontedecimo-Fumeri
- 840 Bolzaneto-Pedemonte-Orero-Casella
- 843 Moneglia-Deiva Marina-Piazza-Passano-Framura Costa-Montaretto-Levanto
- 847 Moneglia-Deiva FS-Piazza-Cà di Lazino-Framura-Costa-Montaretto-S.Giorgio-Levanto
- 852 Sestri Levante FS-Velva Santuario-Castello-Carro
- 856 Varese Ligure-Maissana-Tavarone-Missano
- 857 Cogoleto FS-Capieso-Lerca-Cogoleto FS
- 869 Gattorna-Tribogna-Colle Caprile
- 870 Ferriere-Lumarzo-Colle Caprile-Calcinara
- 871 Bogliasco-Pieve Ligure-Pieve Alta
- 872 Recco-Testana-Serro
- 873 Bogliasco-San Bernardo
- 875 Bogliasco-Sessarego
- 876 Sori-Lago-Canepa-Levà-Sussisa-Capreno-Sori
- 878 Sori-Capreno-Sussisa-Levà-Canepa-Lago-Sori
- 879 Sori-Via Solimano-Teriasca
- 881 Sori-S.Apollinare-Rupanego-Sori
- 882 Rapallo-Santa Margherita Ligure-Portofino

==== 900-999 ====
- 900 Arenzano-Cantarena
- 901 Cogoleto FS-Beuca
- 904 Chiavari-Lavagna Piazza Cordeviola-Cavi FS-Sestri L. Via Nazionale-Riva Trigoso
- 905 Chiavari-Lavagna Piazza Cordeviola-Cavi FS-Sestri L. Via B. Powell-Battilana
- 906 Voltri-Mele Paese-Biscaccia
- 907 Masone Isolazza-Campoligure FS-Rossiglione-Vara Superiore
- 908 Maddalena-Masone-Groppo-Campoligure FS-Rossiglione
- 909 Chiavari-Zoagli (Aurelia)-Rapallo FS
- 910 Bromia-Laccio-Torriglia
- 915 Borzonasca-Borzone
- 916 Borzonasca-Caregli
- 917 Borzonasca-Levaggi-Belpiano-Acero
- 920 Carasco-S.Colombano-Vignale-S.Martino
- 925 Torriglia-Montebruno-Rovegno-Gorreto-Ottone
- 926 Torriglia-Casoni-Fontanigorda-Casanova-Carchelli-Rovegno
- 927 Torriglia-Propata-Rondanina
- 928 Local service for the Comune of Torriglia
- 929 Local service for the Comune of Fascia and Rovegno
- 931 Local service for the Comune of Gorreto
- 932 Rivarolo Brin (Capolinea Metro)-Bolzaneto-Santuario N.S. della Guardia
- 933 Varese Ligure-Cerro-Valletti-Codivara
- 941 Sestri Levante FS-Via B. Powell-Trigoso-Bracco-Ca' Marcone
- 945 Chiavari-Lavagna Piazza Cordeviola-Cavi-Sestri L. Via Nazionale-Riva Trigoso-Battilana
- 948 Moneglia-Deiva Marina-Mezzema
- 949 Cà di Lazino-Castagnola-Bonassola-Levanto
- 955 Genova Brignole-Bargagli-Laccio-Trefontane
- 962 Moneglia-S.Saturnino-Bracco-Crova-Casale-Moneglia
- 964 Moneglia-Comeglio-Pian di capre-S.Saturnino-Lemeglio-Moneglia
- 965 Moneglia-Lemeglio-Comeglio-Moneglia
- 966 Moneglia-Comeglio-Pian di capre-San Saturnino-Moneglia
- 967 Moneglia-Littorno-Comeglio-Pian di Capre-S.Saturnino-Moneglia
- 968 Moneglia-Comeglio-Littorno-Moneglia
- 973 San Rocco Park-Via Castagneto Seia-Migliaro-Piazza Schiaffino-Camogli FS
- 988 Rapallo FS-Laggiaro-Via delle balze-S.Agostino-Via Landea-Rapallo FS
- 993 Colle Caprile-Terrile-Recco

== Fleet ==
=== AMT Genova Bus Fleet ===
==== Urban Buses and Mid-Buses ====
- 1937-1938 Mercedes Benz 315 Sprinter-Sora
- 1939 FIAT Ducato
- 3031-3035 Mercedes Benz Sprinter Tomassini CI/26
- 3301-3330 Autodromo Tango
- 3842-3851 Irisbus Citelis 10
- 3852-3871 Mercedes Benz O530 Citaro C2K
- 3901-3954 Iveco Citiclass 491.10.27
- 4551-4570 Bredamenarinibus M231 MU
- 4571-4601 Bredamenarinibus M231 MU
- 4602-4610 Bredamenarinibus M231 VivaCity MU
- 4614-4616 Bredamenarinibus M231/E5 VivaCity+ MU
- 4641-4648 IIA M231/E6 VivaCity+ MU
- 4801-4824 Bredamenarinibus M230 CU
- 4951-4973 IIA M231/E6 VivaCity+ MU
- 4981-4992 Heuliez GX137
- 5026-5050 Iveco Bus Daily Indicar Mobi City 7
- 5101-5105 Autodromo Alé (2 Doors)
- 5201-5225 Autodromo Alé (3 Doors)
- 5231-5236 Rampini Alé
- 5241-5244 Rampini Alé Euro 6
- 5301-5325 Cacciamali TCC685 "Grifone"
- 5326-5335 Cacciamali TCC690 "Grifone"
- 5501-5507 Mercedes Sprinter CarInd (owned by Gelosobus and AUTOTICINO)
- 5601-5608 Iveco Bus Sitcar Road (owned by Della Penna)
- 7001-7084 IIA Menarini Citymood 10
- 8701-8750 Scania OmniCity 12
- 8801-8845 Bredamenarinibus M240 AvanCity LU
- 8851-8875 Bredamenarinibus M240/E5 AvanCity+ LU
- E020-E030 Iveco Urbanway 12 Hybrid
- E111-E145 Rampini Alé E80
- E301-E331 Irizar ie bus 10
- E801-E830 Solaris Urbino IV 12 Electric

==== Urban Bendy Buses ====
- 9141-9146, 9151-9195 Mercedes Benz O530GN Citaro C2
- 9301-9354 VanHool AG300 New
- 9401-9417 Solaris Urbino III 18
- 9421-9422 Solaris Urbino IV 18

==== Trolleybuses ====
- 2101-2117 VanHool AG300 New

=== AMT Extra ===
These buses were absorbed into AMT Extra on the 1st January 2021 from ATP Esercizio:

- 1214-1215 Cacciamali TCC685
- 1221-1225 Cacciamali Urby
- 1226-1228 Cacciamali TCC685
- 1229-1230 and 1233 Cacciamali Urby CNG
- 1231-1232 Cacciamali Urby
- 1301-1310 Iveco 200E.9.27 Europolis S
- 1316-1319 Irisbus 203E.7.23 Europolis S
- 1330 Isuzu Novociti Life
- 1401-1403 Bredamenarinibus M240 NS
- 1404-1405 Heuliez Bus GX117L
- 1406-1410 MAN NL263 A23 Lion's City M
- 1411-1412 Iveco Crossway low Entry City
- 1505-1508 Bredamenarinibus M240 LS
- 1600 Irisbus Crossway EEV LE 12.8
- 2108-2111 Irisbus Daily 50C
- 2112-2113 Otokar Centro
- 2214-2213 FIAT Dietrich City 21
- 2307-2315 IIA Menarinibus VivaCity 9
- 2316-2322 Heuliez Bus GX137
- 2404-2406 Bredamenarinibus M240 NU
- 2407-2413 Bredamenarinibus M240 NU AvanCity
- 2414-2415 Iveco Cityclass Cursor 491.10.29
- 2416-2417 Otokar Kent C
- 2506-2511 Iveco Cityclass Cursor 491.10.29
- 2512-2513 Iveco Urbanway 12 Hybrid
- 4101-4103 FIAT Ducato
- 4229-4234 Iveco TurboDaily
- 4235 Mercedes Sprinter 418
- 4236-4249 Iveco Daily 50C
- 4250-4264 Cacciamali TCC775M
- 4265-4272 Irisbus Daily
- 4273-4275 Otokar Navigo 185 SE
- 4277-4278 Otokar Navigo 160 SE
- 4279-4282 BMC Midilux L750
- 4283-4290 Irisbus Daily
- 4291-4292 FIAT Ducato
- 4293-4294 Irisbus Daily
- 4295-4297 Iveco Daily Line 50C
- 4298-4299 Iveco Daily Line 60C
- 4304-4308 Cacciamali TCI840
- 4309-4314 Cacciamali Thesi II
- 4315 Cacciamali TCI840 GT
- 4420-4429 Iveco 380.10.35 Euroclass Orlandi
- 4431-4439 Scania De SimonIN 3.301
- 4440-4445 Irisbus Crossway
- 4446 Cacciamali TCI972
- 4448 Cacciamali TCI972
- 4449-4453 VanHool 913 CL
- 4454-4477 Iveco Crossway Low Entry Line
- 4503-4507 Iveco Eurorider Orlandi
- 4508-4510 Iveco Euroclass 380.12
- 4511-4515 Iveco MyWay
- 4516-4253 Scania De Simon IL 3.301
- 4525-4530 Bredamenarinibus Lander
- 4534-4543 Iveco Crossway Line
- 4601 Irisbus Ares 15.36
- 5200-5215 Otokar Navigo U
- 5216 Iveco Daily.
- 5217 Irisbus Daily
- 5218-5219 Iveco Daily Line 50C
- 5220 Iveco Daily Line 40C
- 8202 Iveco TurboDaily
- 8204 Irisbus Daily
- 8206 Irisbus Daily
- 8207 Iveco Daily Tourys
- 8402 Irisbus Crossway
- 8505-8506 Irisbus Domino 2001 Orlandi
- 8507-8508 Irisbus Evadys

=== Former Fleet of AMT Genova ===
The fleet series numbers mentioned in this section include vehicles which are no longer in service at AMT, and have either been withdrawn or demolished. A few vehicles, however, have been preserved by AMT and private organisations.

==== Private Hire, Suburban, and Interurban Buses ====
- 130 Iveco 315.8.17 Menarini
- 201-210 FIAT 308R Cameri
- 306-321 Iveco 370.10.25
- 381-384 and 386-388 Iveco 380.10.35 EuroClass Orlandi
- 830-831 Bredamenarinibus M220E/LS
- 910 and 920 Iveco 370.10.24
- 930 Iveco 370S.10.24
- 970 Menarini M102/1 SBH
- 980, 982, and 984 Iveco 380.12 Orlandi TopClass

==== Urban Minibuses ====
- 1001-1002 Iveco Autodromo (CAM) Pollicino 280 TH
- 1003 Iveco CAM Pollicino NEW TH
- 1010-1011 Autodromo Pollicino New
- 1935-1936 FIAT Ducato Sora
- 3011-3016 Iveco CAM Pollicino 280 AU
- 3020-3025 Autodromo Pollicino New
- 3041-3045 FIAT 242 Coriasco
- M001-M007 Mercedes Benz O413 Sprinter Sora (M005 and M007 sold to the Protezione Civile
- M020-M021 Mercedes Benz O416 Sprinter CNG Sora

==== Urban Buses and Midbuses ====
- 3101-3180 FIAT 418 AC Cameri (Vöv windscreen)
- 3181-3192 FIAT 418 AC Cameri
- 3201-3230 FIAT 418 AC Portesi AU310
- 3251-3290 FIAT 418 AC BCF AU610A
- 3401-3440 FIAT 418 AC Portesi AU295
- 3441-3469 FIAT 418 AC Portesi 2021
- 3501-3530 FIAT 418 AL De Simon
- 3601-3650 FIAT 418 AL Cameri
- 3701-3705 Iveco 480.9.3 TurboCity Viberti U992
- 3721-3725 Iveco 490.12.22 TurboCity-UR
- 3801-3841 Iveco 490.12.22 TurboCity-UR
- 4001-4006 Iveco 470.10.20
- 4011-4043 Iveco 471.10.20 U-Effeuno (no. 4027, 4028, and 4039 have been sold to AMT Vittuone)
- 4051-4055 Iveco 471.10.20 U-Effeuno Viberti U692
- 4101-4141 Inbus Bredabus U210 FT-N
- 4201-4243 Menarini M201/2 NU
- 4301-4370 Bredabus BB 2001.10 LL
- 4561 and 4562 Bredamenarinibus M231 MU
- 4580 Bredamenarinibus M231 MU
- 4601-4667 FIAT 409 Menarini M1231
- 4671 Siccar 181C
- 4672-4698 Inbus U150 Siccar 181CU
- 4701-4725 FIAT 314/3 Portesi AU277
- 4736-4796 Iveco 316.8 Portesi VS
- 4851-4864 Menarini M1201/3
- 4871-4885 FIAT 316.8.13 Menarini C13
- 4891-4895 FIAT 316.8.17 Menarini C13
- 4901-4917 Iveco 418 AC Portesi VS.880
- 4921-4946 Inbus Bredabus U150 Siccar 181MU (4935 and 4946 sold to AMT Vittuone)
- 5001-5025 Cacciamali TCC685 L1M "Grifone"
- 5327 Cacciamali TCC690 "Grifone"
- 8001-8100 FIAT 421 AL Cameri
- 8101-8112 Iveco 471.12.20 U-Effeuno
- 8121-8130 Iveco 471.12.21 TurboCity-U
- 8201-8265 Iveco 470.12.20
- 8301-8310 Inbus U210 Siccar 176UL
- 8401-8410 Menarini M201LU
- 8501-8505 Iveco 470.12.20 Mauri
- 8601-8641 Iveco Cityclass 491.12.27
- 8651-8670 Iveco Cityclass Cursor 491.12.29
- 8671-8693 Iveco CityClass Cursor 491.12.29
- 8702,8717, and 8731 Scania OmniCity 12
- 8802 and 8836 Bredamenarinibus M240 AvanCity LU
- E001-E016 Iveco 490.12.22 TurboCity-UR "Altrobus"
- E017-E018 Iveco 490.12.22 TurboCity-UR Viberti "Altrobus"
- E101-E108 Cacciamali Elfo
- E201-E205 Mercedes Benz O520 Cito 9,6 m

==== Bendy Buses ====
- 9001-9040 Iveco 471.18.24 U-Effeuno Viberti
- 9051-9119 Bredamenarinibus M321 U
- 9121-9135 MAN 253 A23
- 9201-9223 Iveco 491.18.35 CityClass Cursor
- 9307 VanHool AG300 New

==== Preserved Buses ====
The following vehicles, identified by their fleet number, have been preserved by AMT and private enthusiasts heritage bus associations:

- 3012 Iveco CAM Pollicino 280 AU (purchased by the Parish Church of San Giovanni della Rimessa in 2017).
- 3123 FIAT 418 AC Cameri (preserved by AMT)
- 3127 FIAT 418 AC Cameri (preserved by the Associazione "Il Capolinea" in Genoa)
- 3328 Autodromo Tango UM (preserved by STORICBUS La Spezia in 2021).
- 4239 Menarini M201/2 NU (preserved by STORICBUS La Spezia in 2011)
- 4317, 4353, and 4364 Bredabus BB 2001.10 LL (preserved by STORICBUS La Spezia in 2018 and 2019)
- 4320 Bredabus BB 2001.10 LL (preserved by Associazione FITRAM La Spezia in 2018)
- 4346 Bredabus BB 2001.10 LL (preserved by AMAS Catania)
- 4536 Bredamenarinibus M230 MU (preserved by STORICBUS La Spezia in 2021).
- 4616 FIAT 409 Menarini M1231 (preserved by the Associazione "Il Capolinea" in Genoa)
- 4912 Iveco 418 AC Portesi VS.880 (preserved by Associazione FITRAM La Spezia)
- 8070 FIAT 421 AL Cameri
- 8657 Iveco 491.12.27 CityClass (Preserved by STORICBUS La Spezia in 2023).
- 8691 Iveco 491.12.27 CityClass Cursor (preserved by STORICBUS La Spezia in 2020)
- 9064 Bredamenarinibus M321 U (preserved by Associazione FITRAM La Spezia in 2020)
- 9072 Bredamenarinibus M321 U (preserved by STORICBUS La Spezia in 2019)

==== Trolleybuses ====
- 2001-2020 Bredamenarinibus M220 FLU Bredabus

== Rolling Stock ==
=== Genoa Metro ===
- 01-06 Ansaldo trainsets
- 11-22 Firema 67 A trainsets
- 31-37 Hitachi rail trainsets

=== Genova-Casella railway ===
- A1-A2 T.I.B.B. Carminati&Toselli trainsets (formerly of the Val di Fiemme Electric Railway)
- A5-A6 T.I.B.B. Carminati&Toselli trainsets (formerly of the Spoleto-Norcia railway line)
- A8-A10 Firema/OMS trainsets
- A11-A12 Firema/OMS trainsets
- 29 T.I.B.B. electric locomotive (formerly of the Ferrovia Adriatico Sangritana)
- D1 Gmeinder / MAK diesel locomotive (formerly of Deutsche Bundesbahn)
- C21 Breda rail coach
- C50-C53 Breda rail coaches
- F23 Freight wagon

== See also ==
- Trolleybuses in Genoa
- Genoa Metro
- ATP Esercizio
