= Chiavari (disambiguation) =

Chiavari may refer to:

- Chiavari, Italy, town and comune on the Italian Riviera in the Province of Genoa, region of Liguria
  - Chiavari railway station
  - Roman Catholic Diocese of Chiavari
- Coti-Chiavari, commune in Corsica, France
- Chiavari chair, wooden chair originating in the Ligurian town
