= Sestri Levante railway station =

Railway station in Italy

Sestri Levante
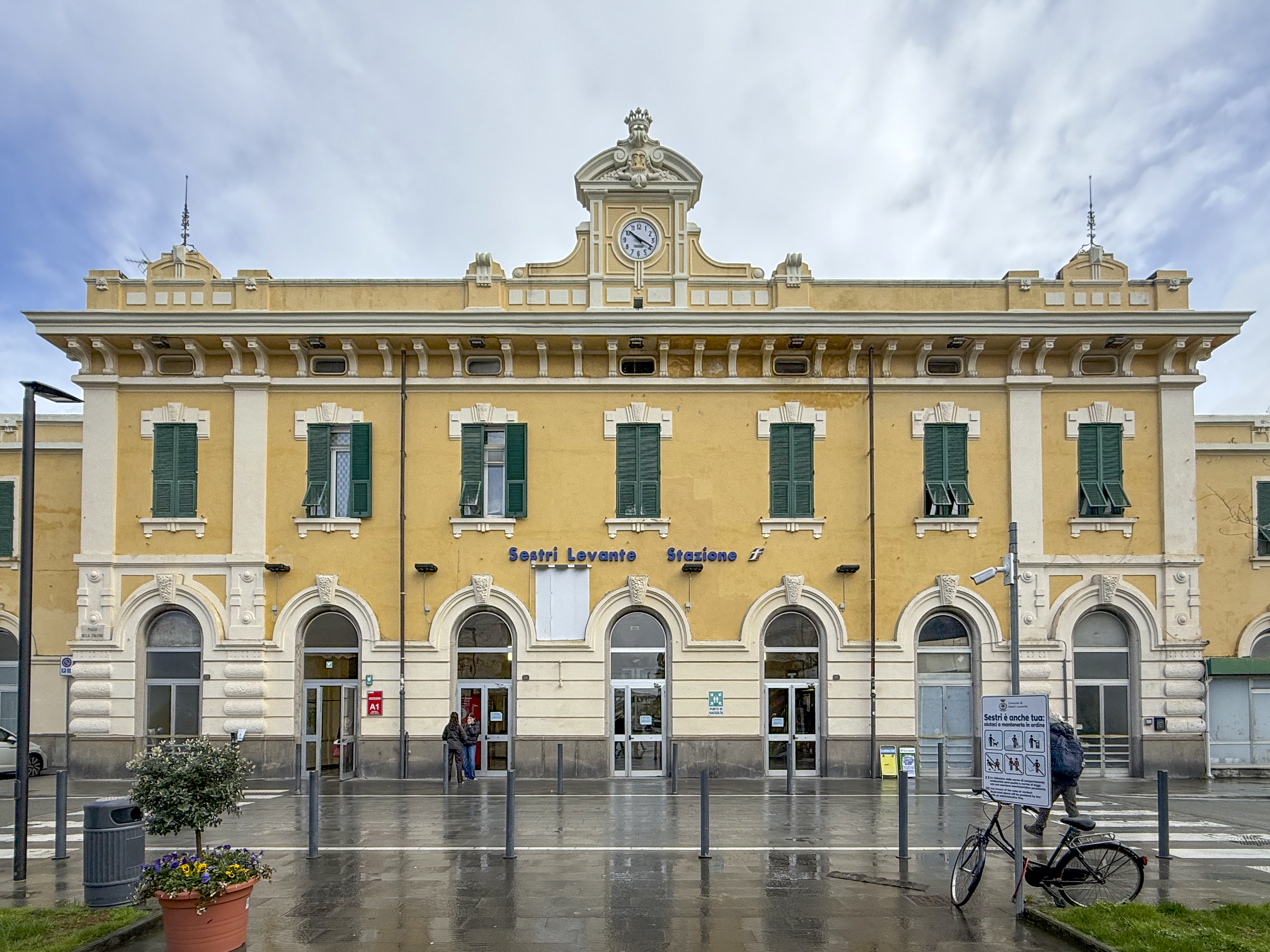

General information
- Location: Piazza Nuova Stazione 7 Sestri Levante, Genoa, Liguria
- Coordinates: 44°16′34″N 9°23′51″E
- Operator: Rete Ferroviaria Italiana
- Line: Pisa–Genoa
- Platforms: 7
- Train operators: Trenitalia

Other information
- Classification: Silver

History
- Opened: 27 August 1924; 101 years ago
- Electrified: May 1925; 101 years ago; April 1947; 79 years ago
Location
- Location within Liguria Location within Northern Italy Location within Italy

Sestri Levante railway station (Stazione di Sestri Levante) is located on the Genoa–Pisa railway. It serves the town of Sestri Levante, Italy.

== History ==
The first Sestri Levante station was opened on 23 November 1870, coinciding with the opening of the railway line from Chiavari, becoming the temporary terminus of the line from Genoa, which was extended to La Spezia in 1874. The original line a ran on a route via Viale Giuseppe Mazzini (a variant of the Roman Via Aurelia) – Piazza Italia – Piazza Sant'Antonio – Via Vincenzo Fascie (a variant of the modern Via Aurelia which is now a national route), until it rejoined the current alignment.

The timber station was therefore located closer to the sea than the current line, in an area adjacent to the current station forecourt.

The Chiavari–Riva Trigoso section, including the line through Sestri Levante station, was doubled in 1890.

To cope with increasing traffic, the current station was opened on 27 August 1924, located further inland on a larger site and equipped with several platforms for departures to Genoa. This station came into operation on 27 July 1925, in conjunction with a rearrangement of the station area. The previous temporary station building was replaced with the current, monumental building. The old tracks were dismantled together with the old passenger building which was demolished.

At the same time, the station was electrified at the three-phase voltage of 3600 V at 16 2/3 Hz, which was activated in 1926. The conversion to 3000 V DC took place in April 1947 towards La Spezia (the station temporarily became the location for a traction change) and on 25 April 1948 the new system was extended towards Genoa.

== Buildings and infrastructure ==
The station has 5 passing tracks and 2 (3 until 2007) platform tracks for passenger services, plus other passing tracks used for the storage of railway wagons and train sets not in service.

In the past there were also two other main line tracks without a platform that connected to the freight yard, but these were removed in 2007 together with a third main line track for passenger trains so that a car park and a building complex could be built.

Trains that do not have terminate at this station stop at platforms 2 and 3 (2 towards Genoa, 3 towards La Spezia), while the other tracks are used for trains starting or stopping in Sestri.

== Rail services ==
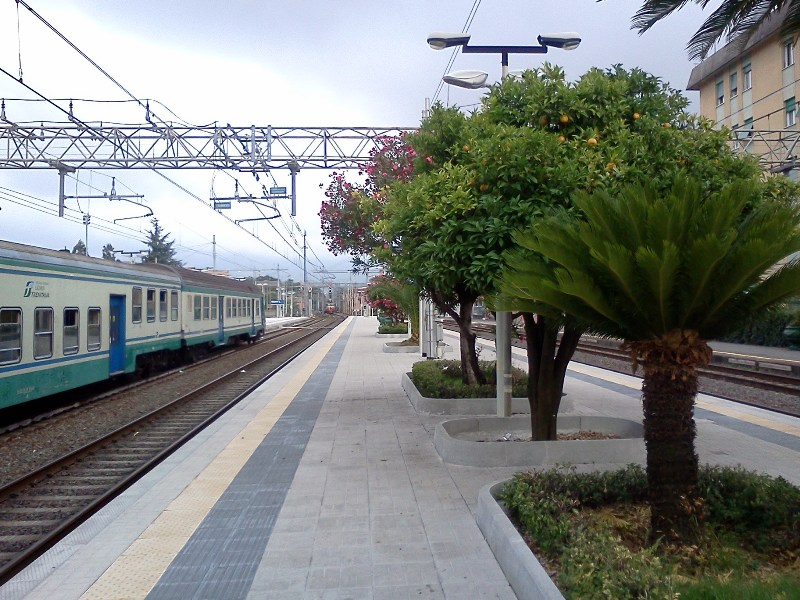
Platforms

The station is served by Trenitalia regional services operated under a contract with the region of Liguria. In particular, the station is used both as a terminus and a stop for regional services on the line to Genoa and Savona and on the line to the Cinque Terre and the La Spezia area.

Trenitalia long-distance services and regional services that connect the town to Milan, which are operated with Trenord rolling stock, also stop at Sestri Levante.

In the past, the station was the terminus of international services towards Switzerland and Germany, such as the Eurocity services, Carlo Magno and Barbarossa.

== Services ==
The station is managed by RFI, which classified it in 2008 in the silver category. The seven tracks all adjoin platforms and are connected to each other by an underpass. It has:

- ticket counter
- ticket machines
- station of the railway police
- toilets
- Newsstand
- waiting room.

== Interchange ==
The station has a commuter car park. The terminus of the ATP Esercizio buses is nearby, giving direct connections to the inland towns.

- bus station
- taxi rank.
