= Zecca–Righi funicular =

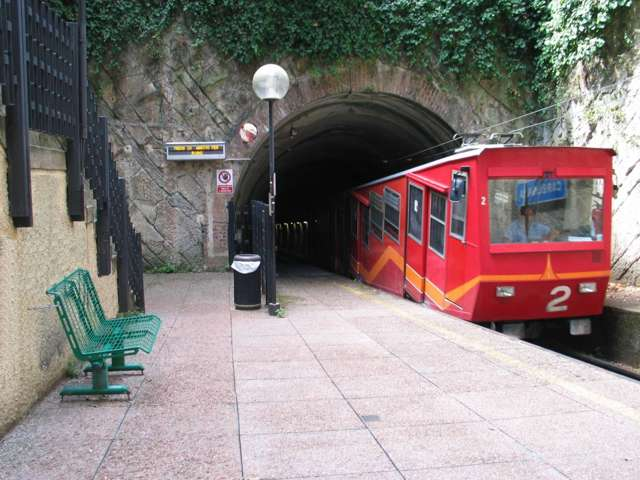
- Train in intermediate station at Carbonara

Overview
- Status: Open
- Locale: Genoa, Liguria, Italy
- Coordinates: 44.4134°N 8.9306°E
- Termini: Largo della Zecca; Righi
- Stations: 7

Service
- Type: Funicular
- Operator: AMT Genova

History
- Opened: 1895

Technical
- Line length: 1,428 m (4,685 ft)
Route map
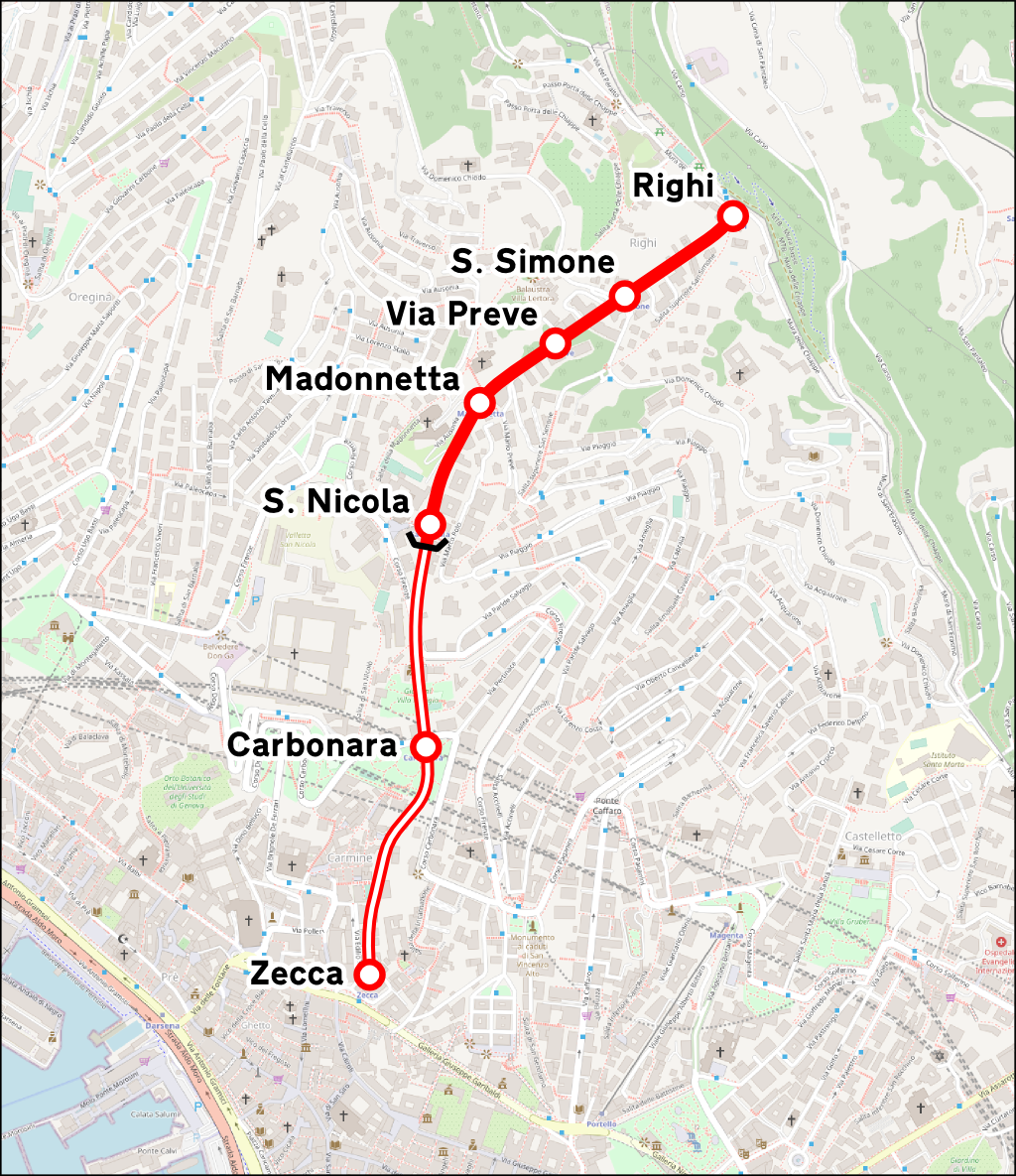

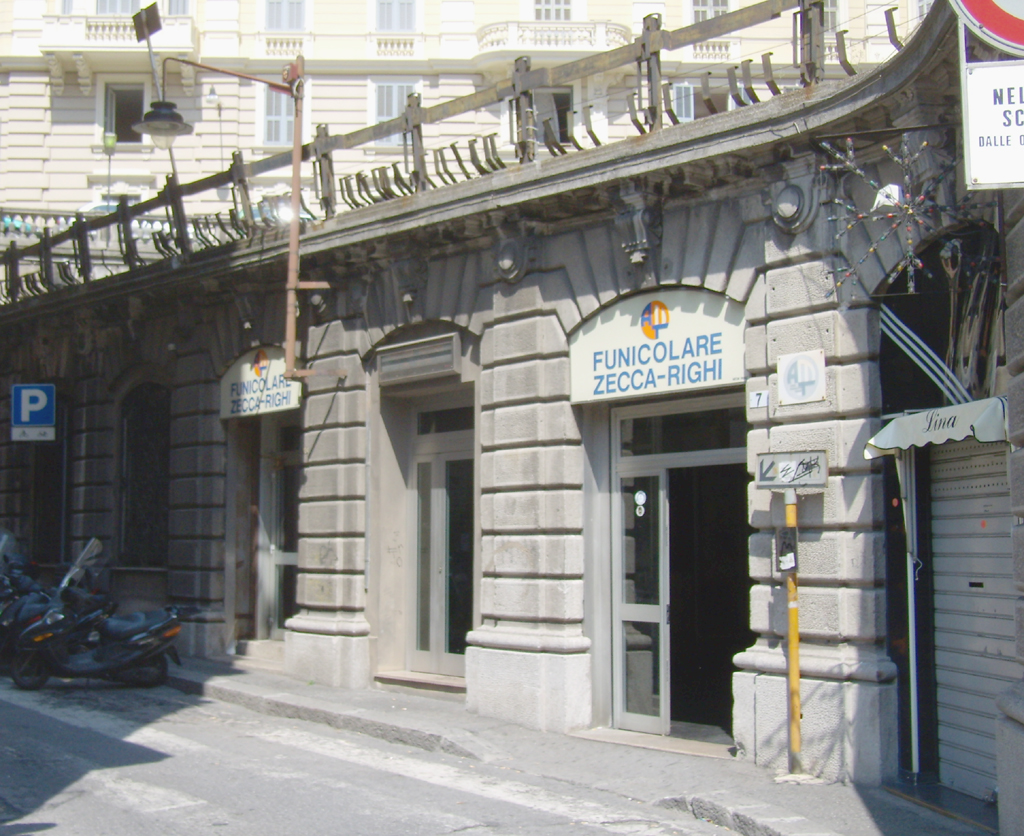
The lower station

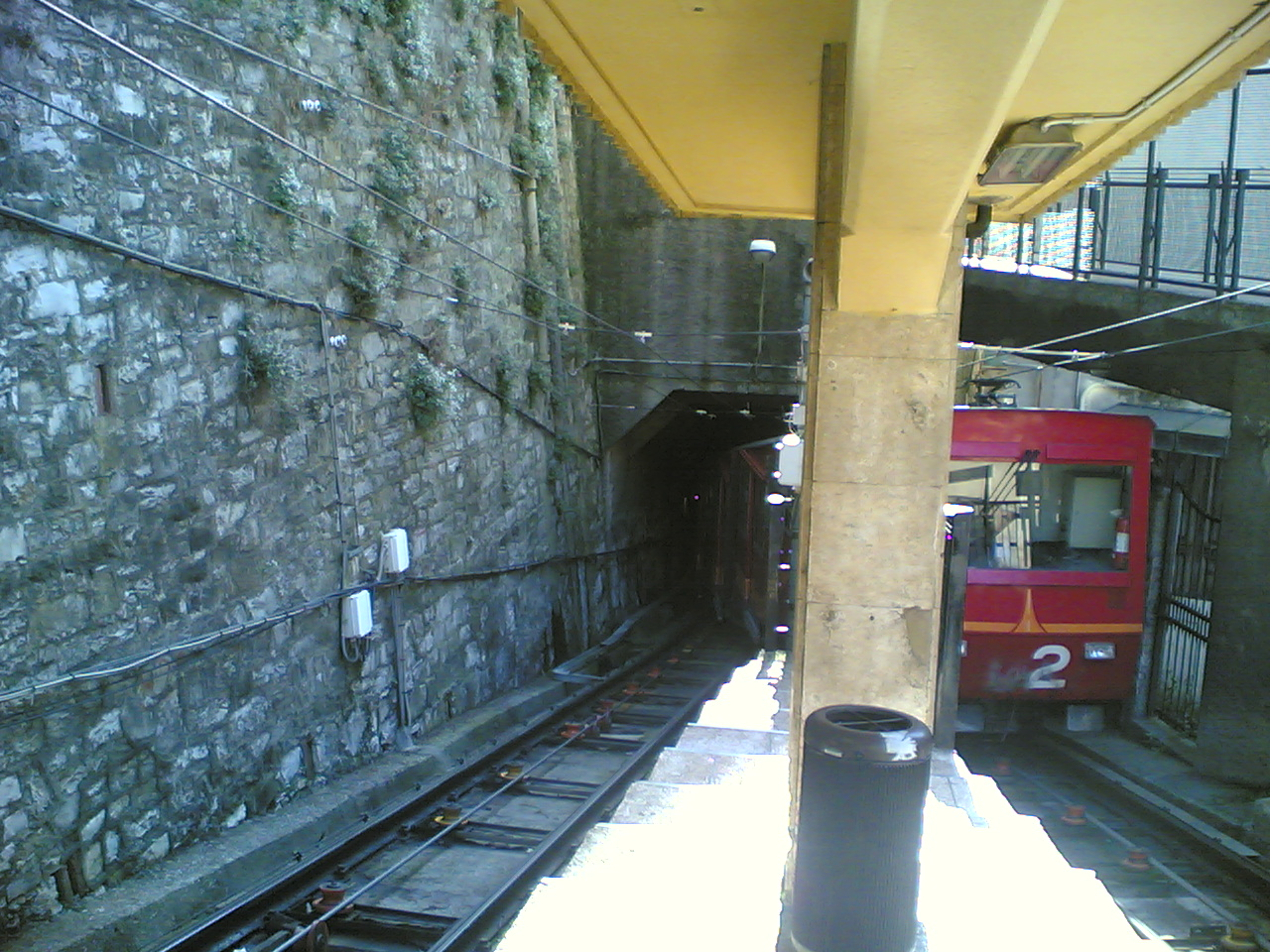
Passing loop and station at San Niccolò

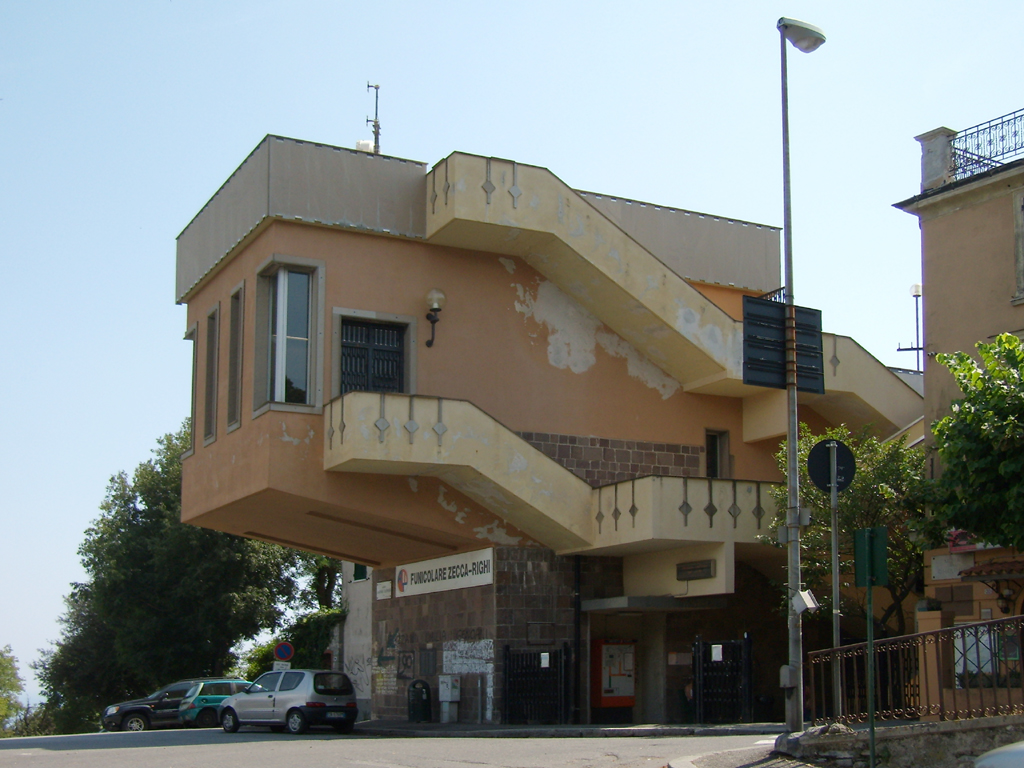
The upper station

The Zecca–Righi funicular (Italian: Funicolare Zecca–Righi) is a funicular railway in the Italian city of Genoa connecting the Largo della Zecca, on the edge of the historic city centre, to several stations on the slope of the Righi hill. The line is one of several true funiculars in the city, including the Sant'Anna funicular and the Quezzi funicular, although the Principe–Granarolo rack railway is also sometimes erroneously described as a funicular.

== History ==
The line was originally built as a two-section funicular, with passengers transferring between the two sections at the station of San Nicola. The upper section opened in 1895 and was constructed in the open, with three intermediate stations at Madonnetta, Via Preve and San Simone, as well as the section terminals at San Nicola and Righi. The lower section opened in 1897 and was entirely in tunnel, except for its terminals and the single intermediate station at Carbonara.

Between 1963 and 1965, the line was completely rebuilt as a single section funicular, with a passing loop at San Nicola and retaining all the existing stations. In 1990, the line was again rebuilt, with longer trains and platforms, and an increased haulage speed.

The line closed on 31 March 2015 for an overhaul, which is expected to last 3 months.

From 1 December 2021 it has been free to use courtesy of the Municipality of Genoa and AMT.

== Operation ==
The line is currently managed by AMT Genova, and has the following parameters:

Number of cars	2 trains of 2 cars each
Number of stops	7 (2 terminal, 5 intermediate)
Configuration	Single track with passing loop
Track length	1,428 metres (4,685 ft)
Track gauge	1,000 mm (3 ft 3 3/8 in)
Rise	279 m (915 ft)
Gradient	19.91% (average); 35% (maximum)
Capacity	156 passengers per train
Frequency	Every 15 minutes
Maximum speed	6 metres per second (20 ft/s)

== See also ==
- List of funicular railways
