= Quezzi inclined elevator =

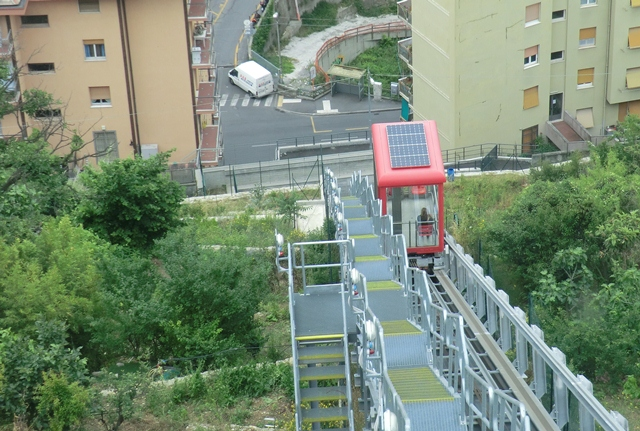

Overview
- Status: Open
- Locale: Genoa, Liguria, Italy
- Coordinates: 44°25′16″N 8°58′18″E

Service
- Type: Inclined elevator
- Operator(s): AMT Genova

History
- Opened: May 2015

Technical
- Line length: 131 m (430 ft)

The Quezzi elevator (Italian: Ascensore inclinato di Quezzi) is a public inclined elevator with variable slope in the Quezzi quarter of Genoa, Italy. The elevator opened in May 2015 and connects the lower terminus at Via Pinetti to the terminus at Via Fontanarossa, with an intermediate stop at Portazza.

The plant is one of the many public people movers in the city, including several elevators and funiculars, the older and best known of which are the Zecca–Righi funicular, the Sant'Anna funicular and the Principe–Granarolo rack railway. The latter is erroneously described as a funicular in popular jargon.

From 1 December 2021 it has been free to use courtesy of the Municipality of Genoa and AMT.

== Operation ==
The elevator, managed by AMT Genova, has a total length of 131 metres (430 ft), of which the lower 27 metres (89 ft) are in a tunnel, the middle 23 metres (75 ft) in a cutting, and the remainder on an elevated rail. The lower section has a gradient of 44%, transitioning to a gradient of 30% in the upper section. The single car is designed to tilt, in order to maintain the floor leveled, despite the change in gradient.

The line has the following parameters:

Number of cars	1
Number of stops	3
Configuration	Single track
Track length	131 metres (430 ft)
Rise	76 m (249 ft)
Gradient	44% (maximum)
Journey time	100 seconds
Capacity	25 passengers per car
