= Ascensore Castello d'Albertis-Montegalletto =

Combined funicular and lift in Genoa, Italy

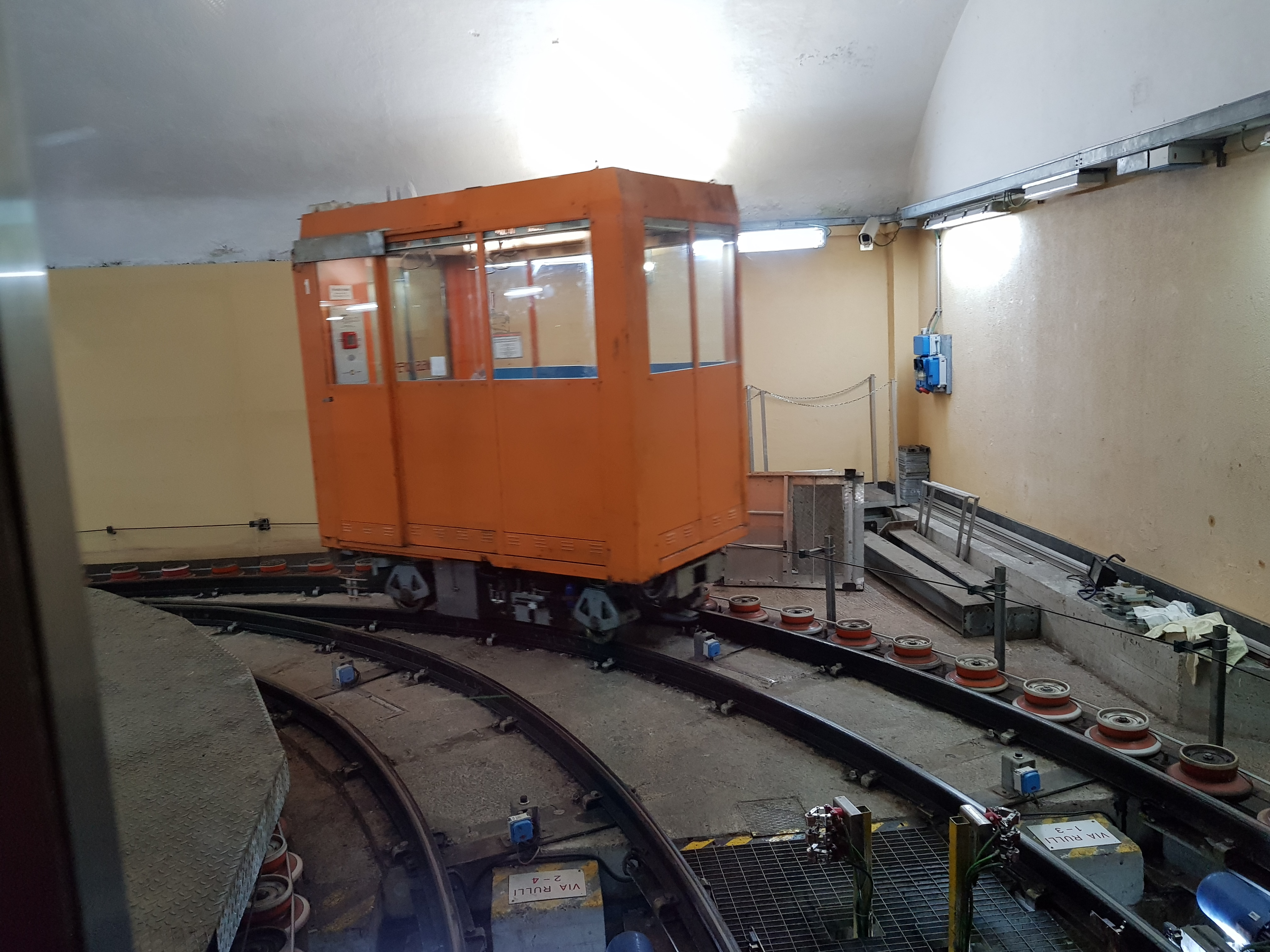
- A gondola in the horizontal tunnel

Overview
- Locale: Genoa, Italy
- Coordinates: 44°25′0.17″N 8°55′25.45″E
- Termini: via Balbi; Corso Dogali
- Connecting lines: Genova Piazza Principe railway station
- Stations: 2
- Website: www.amt.genova.it

Service
- Type: Funicular + Lift
- System: AMT Genova
- Operator(s): AMT Genova

History
- Opened: 1929; 97 years ago (Lift only)
- Closed: 1995; 31 years ago
- Reopened: 15 December 2004; 21 years ago

Technical
- Line length: 235.87 metres (258 yd)
- Number of tracks: 1
- Track gauge: 850 mm (2 ft 9 15/32 in)
- Operating speed: 4.5 m/s (14.8 ft/s) – funicular 1.6 m/s (5.2 ft/s) – lift
- Highest elevation: 72.19 metres (79 yd)

Ascensore Castello d'Albertis-Montegalletto (the Albertis Castle – Montegalletto lift) is a combined funicular and lift in Genoa, Italy. It connects via Balbi, near Genova Piazza Principe railway station, to corso Dogali near Albertis Castle, home of the Museo delle Culture del Mondo (Museum of World Cultures). It is run by AMT Genova.

== History ==
The lift was built in 1929 by a private company, the Società Ligure per Impianto ed Esercizio Ascensori, to connect the main railway station of Genoa with Montegalletto, a name now in disuse that indicated the area at the time subject to a large urban expansion. It rose some seventy meters in altitude, but to reach the two cabins that can seat twenty people, it was necessary to set off into the ground along a tunnel of about three hundred meters. The lift was used frequently by local residents as it had a lower ticket price than those of the local tram, bus and trolley; between 1963 and 1965 the owners replaced the lifts with more modern and fast replacements.

At the end of the 1960s the number of users experienced a gradual reduction due to the introduction of the unified tariff in the Genoa public transport which made it less convenient the use of the lift. On 1 February 1976 it became part of the AMT system (along with the Castelletto Ponente lift). The lifts remained in service until 1995, when the thirty-year useful life expired, the lifts were closed.

== The current system ==
AMT decided not to renew the facility in the previous configuration as the need to travel the long pedestrian tunnel would have been unattractive to users. A preliminary design was created by engineer Michele Montanari of AMT which involved the construction of a funicular to connect to the lifts.

Through a tender, the works were assigned to a consortium led by Poma Italy. The initial stage started with preparation of detailed design; the project was presented in January 2001 to the Italian Minister of Transports for the necessary permits, which were granted on 14 November of the same year. Work began in September 2002 and ended in June 2004.

After a period of testing the lift, it was inaugurated and opened to the public on 15 December 2004.

== Features and Operation ==
The lift consists basically of three subsystems:

- Funicular for transit in the horizontal tunnel;
- Translation system on tyres, as a cableway;
- Lift for the overcoming of the vertical section consists of two distinct platforms (one per cabin).

The two gondolas start simultaneously: the first from the valley station along the horizontal tunnel while the latter begins the descent from the corsa Dogali; the intersection of the gondolas is at the base of the lift shaft when both cabins are taken over from the translation system, while the descending gondola is hooked to the funicular system to start its horizontal path, the ascending gondola is placed on in the lift and raised toward the upstream station.

== Technical data ==
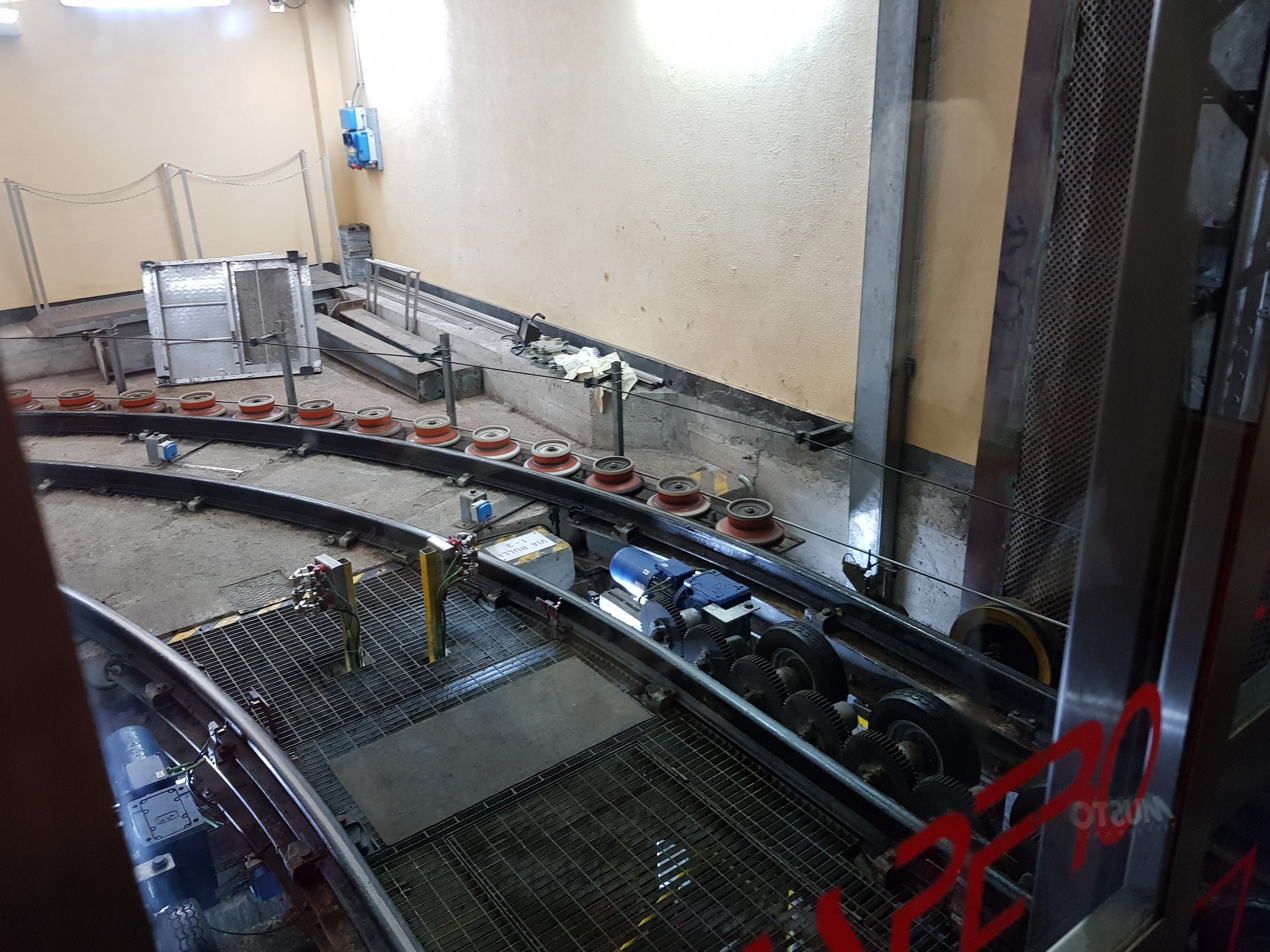
Mode of movement switches from horizontal to vertical and vice versa

Altitude of lower station	22.38 m above sea level
Altitude of upper station	94.60 m asl
Height difference: Horizontal section; Vertical section	72.22 m 2.89 m 69.33 m
Horizontal distance travelled	235.87 m (line 1); 233.71 m (line 2)
Speed of horizontal part	4.5 m/s (1.5 m/s approaching the vertical part)
Speed of translation part	0.25 m/s
Speed of vertical part	1.6 m/s
Cable diameter (funicular)	15 mm
Track gauge	850 mm
Gondola capacity	23 persons
