= Sant'Anna funicular =

Funicular railway in Genoa, Italy

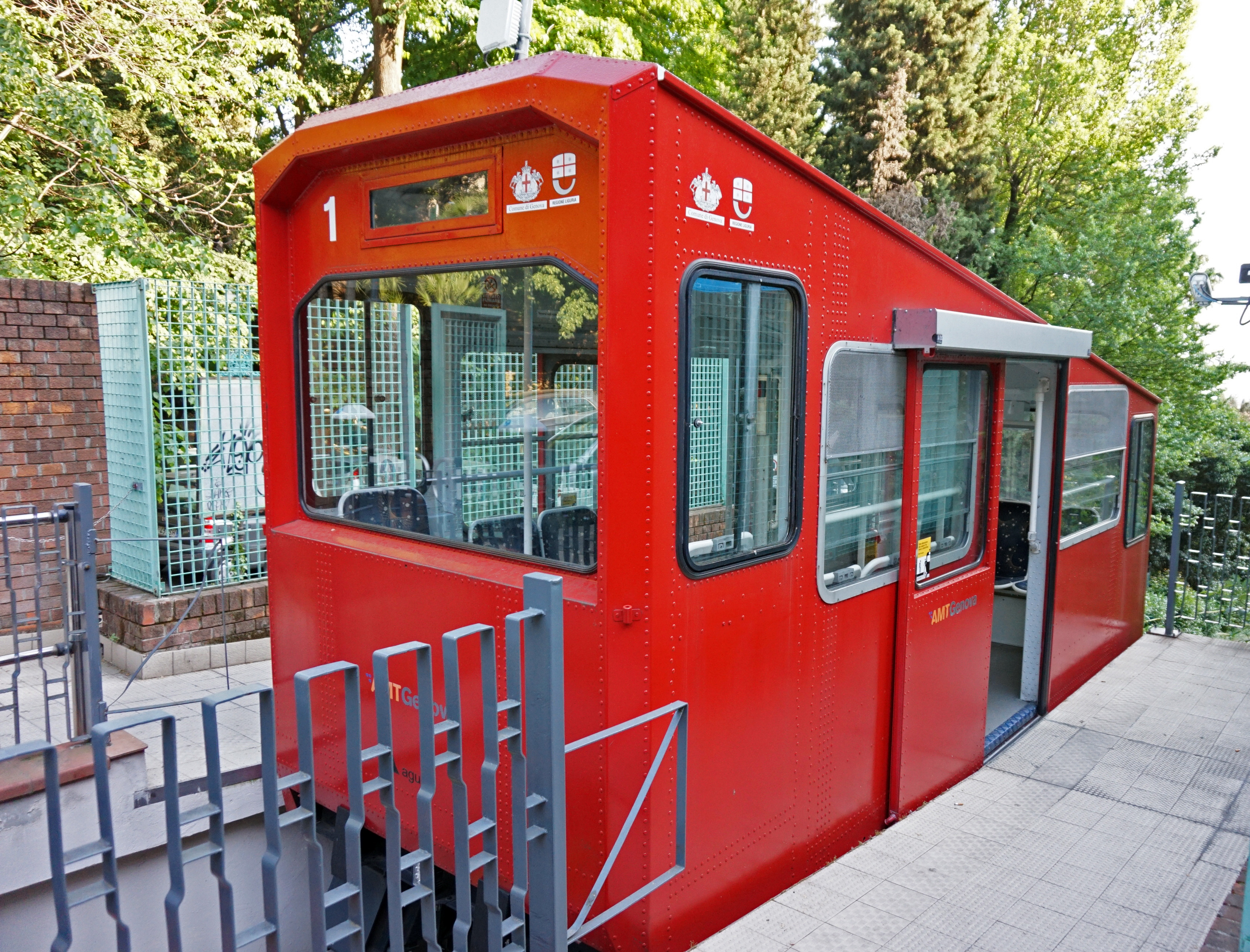
- Car at the upper terminus

Overview
- Status: Open
- Locale: Genoa, Liguria, Italy
- Coordinates: 44°24′47″N 8°56′11″E

Service
- Type: Funicular
- Operator(s): AMT Genova

Technical
- Line length: 357 m (1,171 ft)

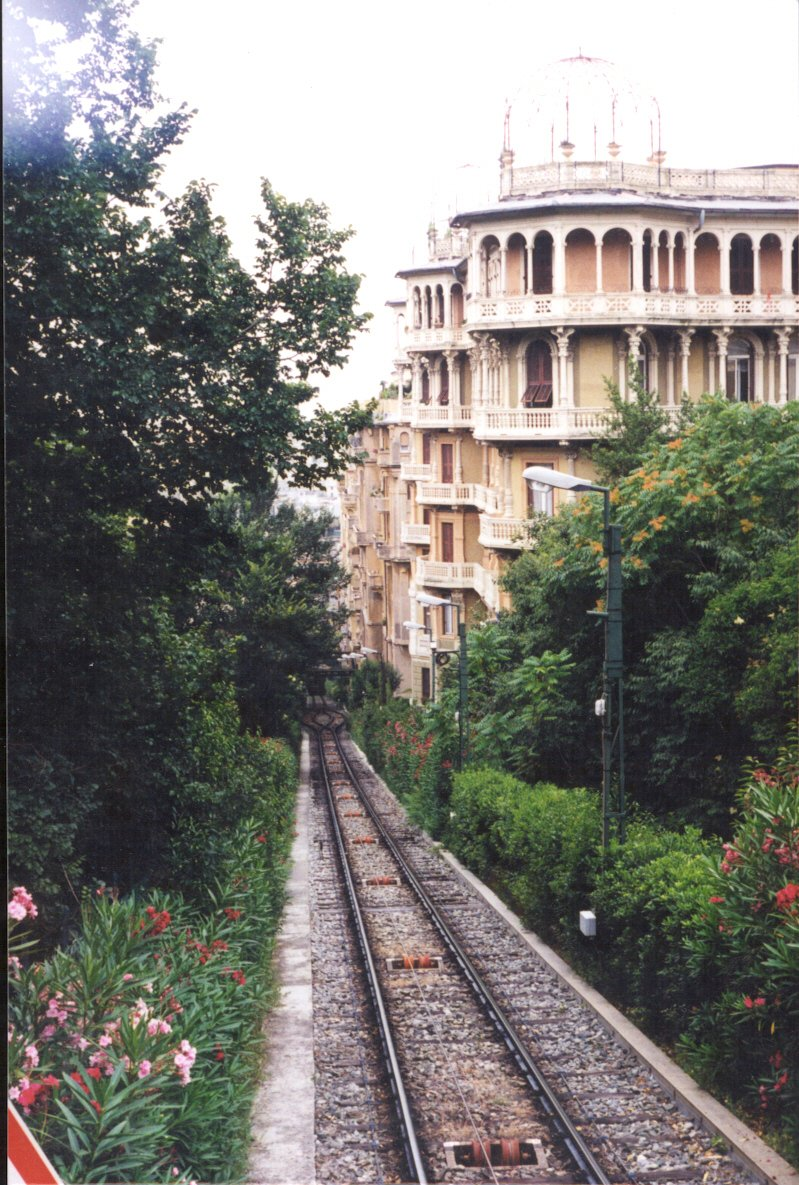
The line

The Sant'Anna funicular (Italian: Funicolare Sant'Anna) is a funicular railway in the Italian city of Genoa connecting the Piazza Portello, on the edge of the historic city centre, to the Corso Magenta. The line is one of several true funiculars in the city, including the Zecca–Righi funicular and the Quezzi funicular, although the Principe–Granarolo rack railway is also sometimes erroneously described as a funicular.

== History ==
The funicular was opened in 1891, and was initially water-driven, with water filling a ballast tank under the carriage at the top station, and emptying at the bottom. The line was converted to electric operation in 1980, and was again modernized in 1991 following a fire that destroyed the top station.

From 1 December 2021 it has been free to use courtesy of the Municipality of Genoa and AMT.

== Operation ==
The line is currently managed by AMT Genova, and has the following parameters:

Number of cars	2
Number of stops	2
Configuration	Single track with passing loop
Track length	357 metres (1,171 ft)
Track gauge	1,200 mm (3 ft 11 1/4 in)
Rise	54 m (177 ft)
Gradient	15.33% (average); 17% (maximum)
Capacity	30 passengers per train
Maximum speed	4 metres per second (13 ft/s)

== See also ==
- List of funicular railways
