= Principe–Granarolo rack railway =

Rack railway in Genoa, Italy

Coordinates: 44.421558°N 8.916354°E

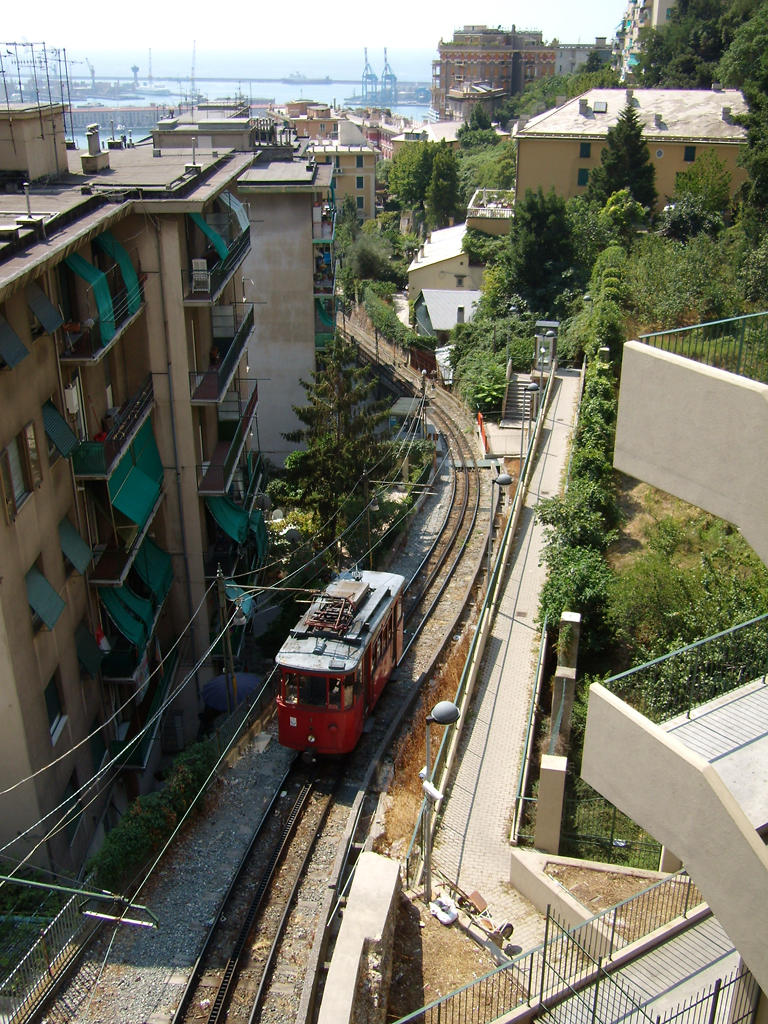
- The Principe–Granarolo railway from via Bari, with car 1 descending towards Principe.

Overview
- Status: Open
- Locale: Genoa, Liguria, Italy
- Stations: 9

Service
- Type: Rack railway
- Operator(s): AMT Genova

History
- Opened: 1901

Technical
- Line length: 1,130 metres (3,710 ft)
- Rack system: Riggenbach
- Track gauge: 1,200 mm (3 ft 11 1/4 in)
- Electrification: 550 V DC
Route map
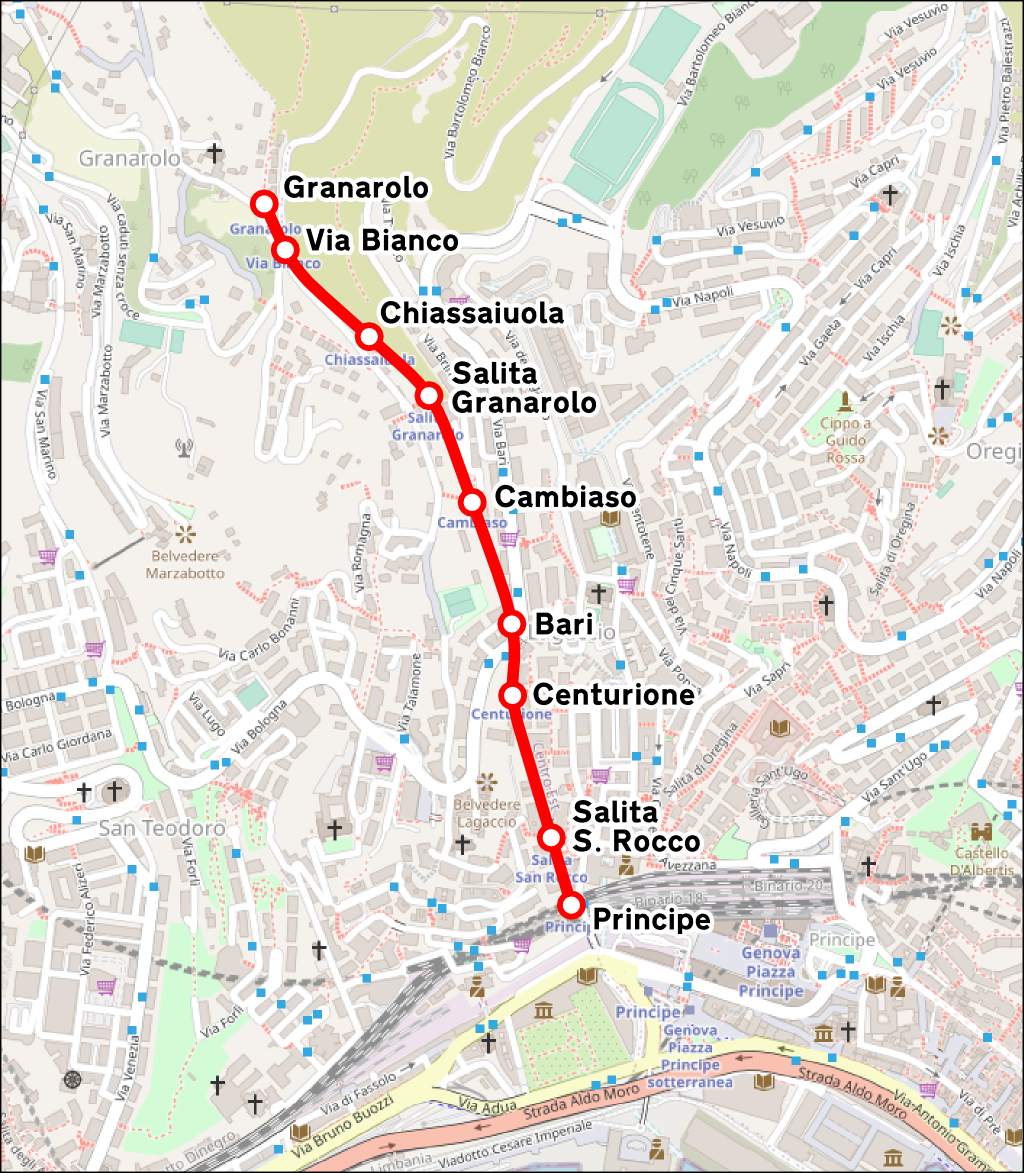

The Principe–Granarolo rack railway (Italian: Ferrovia Principe-Granarolo) is a rack railway in the Italian city of Genoa that connects via del Lagaccio, near the Genoa Piazza Principe railway station, to the Granarolo hills. The line is sometimes erroneously described as a funicular and listed alongside the city's Zecca–Righi funicular, the Sant'Anna funicular and the Quezzi funicular. The line is managed by AMT Genova, which manages the city's public transport. It is a rare example of a rack railway operating within a city (others include the Dolderbahn and Stuttgart Rack Railway).

== History ==
Work on the Principe–Granarolo rack railway started in 1898, and operation commenced in 1901. The line's unusual track gauge and passing loop arrangement, both common in funiculars but rare elsewhere, have suggested to some that the line may have started life as a funicular and been converted to rack operation; however the line's owners have dismissed this theory.

The line's cars were totally rebuilt in 1929, with new body and mechanical equipment, and the line was rebuilt in 1976.

In 2002, car 2 was sent away for an overhaul, but the bankruptcy of the original contractor and the involvement of a replacement in an alleged bribery scandal meant that the overhaul was not completed and the car returned to the line until March 2019. The overhaul included the replacement of the car floor, lighting, safety systems, electric drive, air conditioning and a new driver's seat. Between 2002 and 2019, service was provided by car 1 operating alone. AMT now plans to use the rebuilt car to double the service frequency to every 15 minutes.

== Operation ==
The Principe–Granarolo rack railway is 1,130 metres (3,710 ft) in length, and overcomes a height difference of 194 metres (636 ft) with a maximum gradient of 21.4%. It has a track gauge of 1,200 mm (3 ft 11 1/4 in), uses the Riggenbach rack system and is electrified at 550 V DC. The single central passing loop uses fixed points, and the two cars have double-flanged wheels on one side and unflanged wheels on the other side, thus ensuring that each car keeps to its own side in the loop.

The line serves 9 stops, including the two terminals, and currently operates an irregular timetable, with cars departing each terminus between every 30 and 40 minutes.
