= Rovegno =

Rovegno Roegno
- Comune
- Comune di Rovegno
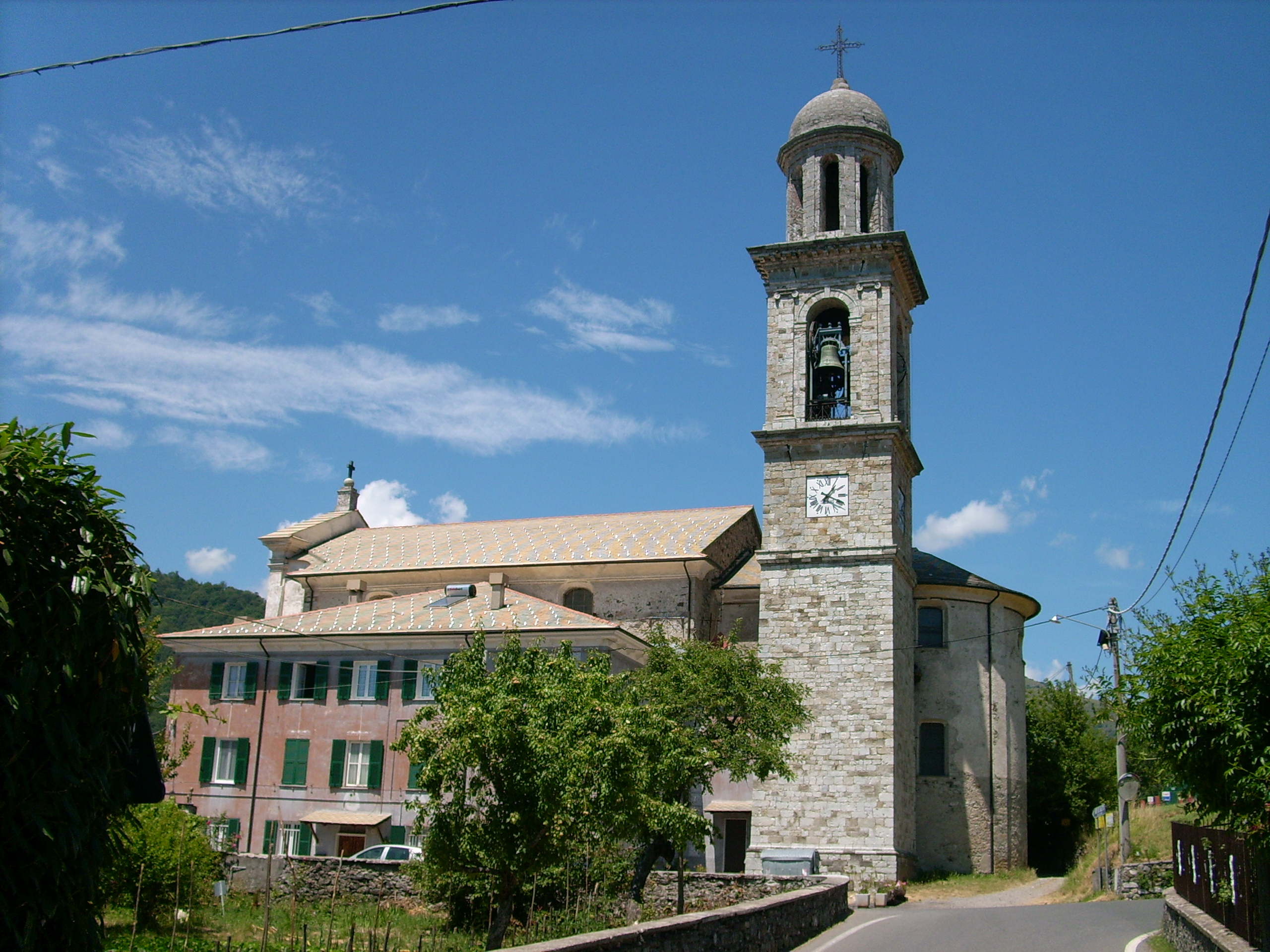
- Church of St. John the Baptist

- Coat of arms

- Location within Italy Location within Liguria
- Coordinates: 44°35′N 9°17′E
- Country: Italy
- Region: Liguria
- Metropolitan city: Genoa (GE)
- Frazioni: Casanova, Foppiano, Garbarino, Isola, Loco, Moglia, Pietranera, Spescia

Government
  - Mayor: Giovanni Giuseppe Isola

Area
  - Total: 44.09 km^{2} (17.02 sq mi)
- Elevation: 658 m (2,159 ft)

Population (31 May 2022)
  - Total: 482
  - Density: 10.9/km^{2} (28.3/sq mi)
- Demonym: Rovegnesi
- Time zone: UTC+1 (CET)
  - Summer (DST): UTC+2 (CEST)
- Postal code: 16028
- Dialing code: 010
- Patron saint: St. John the Baptist
- Saint day: 24 June
- Website: Official website

Rovegno (Ligurian: Roegno) is a comune (municipality) in the Metropolitan City of Genoa in the Italian region Liguria, located about 35 kilometres (22 mi) northeast of Genoa, in the Val Trebbia. Rovegno borders the following municipalities: Fascia, Fontanigorda, Gorreto, Ottone, Rezzoaglio.
