= Crocefieschi =

Crocefieschi A Croxe di Fieschi
- Comune
- Comune di Crocefieschi
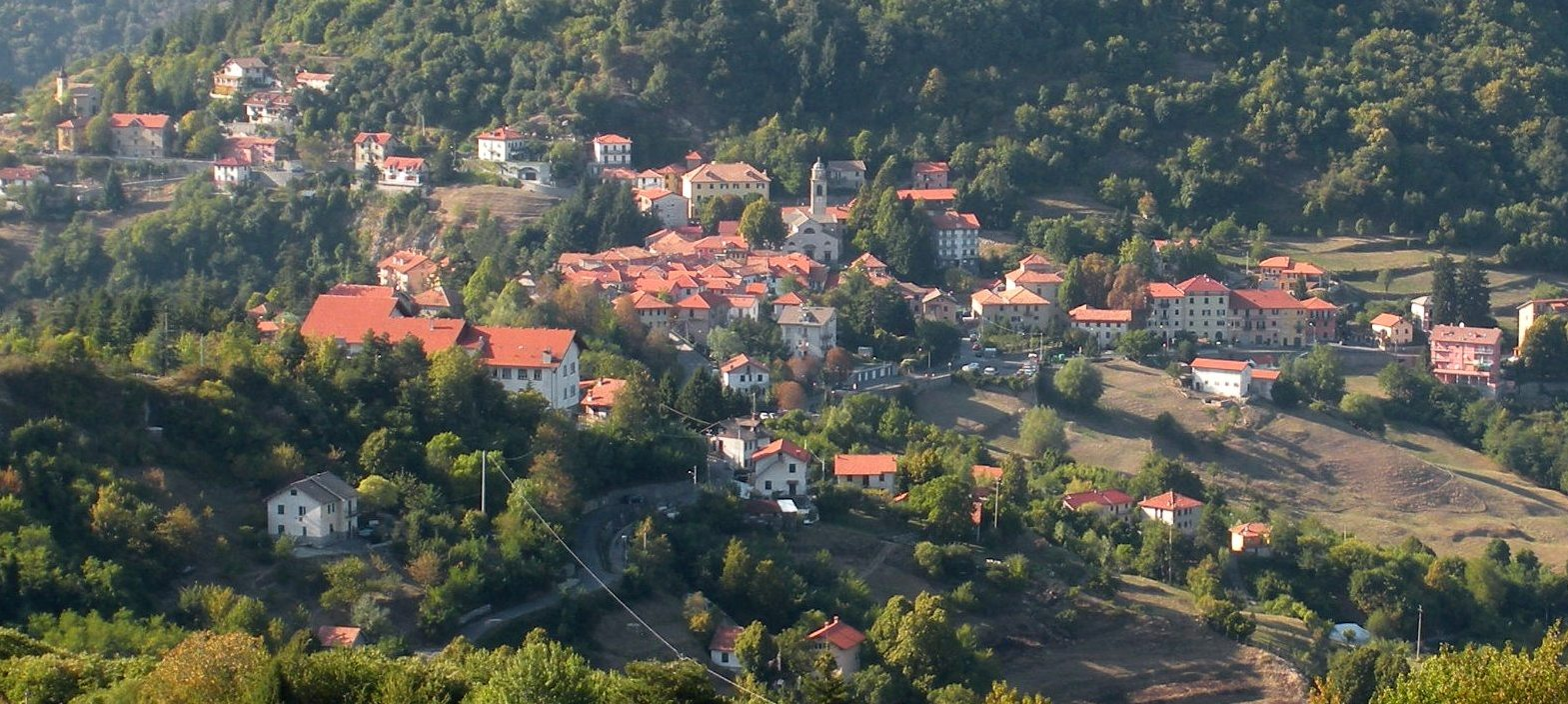
- Crocefieschi

- Location within Italy Location within Liguria
- Coordinates: 44°35′N 9°1′E
- Country: Italy
- Region: Liguria
- Metropolitan city: Genoa (GE)
- Frazioni: Crebaia, Crosi, Preria, Strassera, Vallegge, Vallemara

Government
  - Mayor: Bartolomeo Venzano

Area
  - Total: 11.73 km^{2} (4.53 sq mi)
- Elevation: 742 m (2,434 ft)

Population (30 June 2017)
  - Total: 534
  - Density: 45.5/km^{2} (118/sq mi)
- Demonym: Crocesi
- Time zone: UTC+1 (CET)
  - Summer (DST): UTC+2 (CEST)
- Postal code: 16010
- Dialing code: 010
- Website: Official website

Crocefieschi (Ligurian: A Croxe di Fieschi) is a comune (municipality) in the Metropolitan City of Genoa in the Italian region Liguria, located about 20 kilometres (12 mi) northeast of Genoa. Crocefieschi borders the following municipalities: Busalla, Savignone, Valbrevenna, Vobbia.

== See also ==
- Parco naturale regionale dell'Antola
