= Carasco =

- Comune
- Comune di Carasco
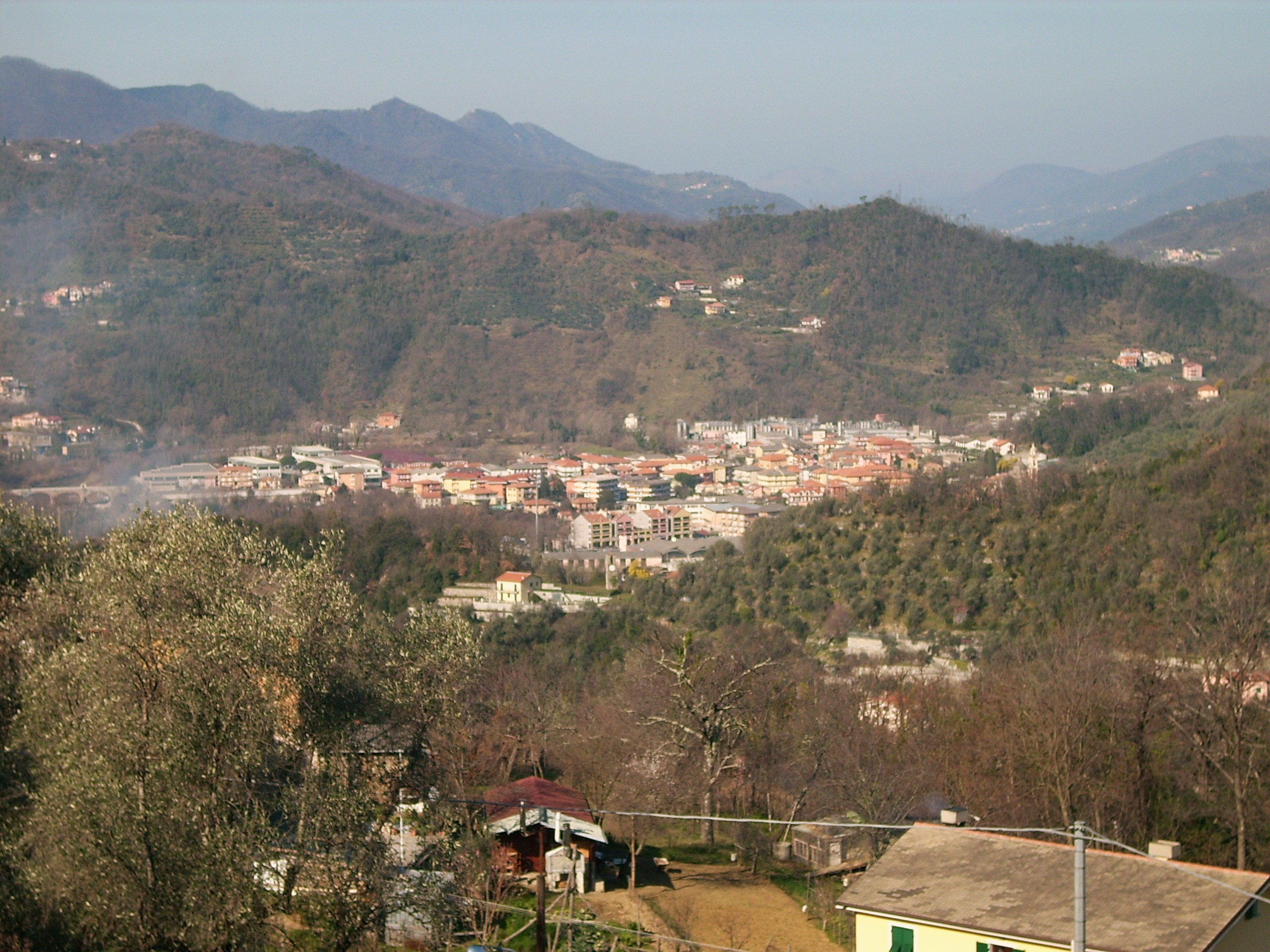

- Coat of arms

- Location within Italy Location within Liguria
- Coordinates: 44°21′N 9°21′E
- Country: Italy
- Region: Liguria
- Metropolitan city: Genoa (GE)
- Frazioni: San Pietro, Santa Maria, Rivarola, Graveglia, Paggi

Government
  - Mayor: Boris Lorenzo Beronio

Area
  - Total: 8.46 km^{2} (3.27 sq mi)
- Elevation: 26 m (85 ft)

Population (31 May 2017)
  - Total: 3,745
  - Density: 443/km^{2} (1,150/sq mi)
- Demonym: Caraschini
- Time zone: UTC+1 (CET)
  - Summer (DST): UTC+2 (CEST)
- Postal code: 16042
- Dialing code: 0185
- Website: Official website

Carasco is a comune (municipality) in the Metropolitan City of Genoa in the Italian region Liguria, located about 35 kilometres (22 mi) east of Genoa in the Val Fontanabuona.

Carasco borders the following municipalities: Chiavari, Cogorno, Leivi, Mezzanego, Ne, San Colombano Certénoli.
