= Gorreto =

Gorreto O Gorrëio
- Comune
- Comune di Gorreto
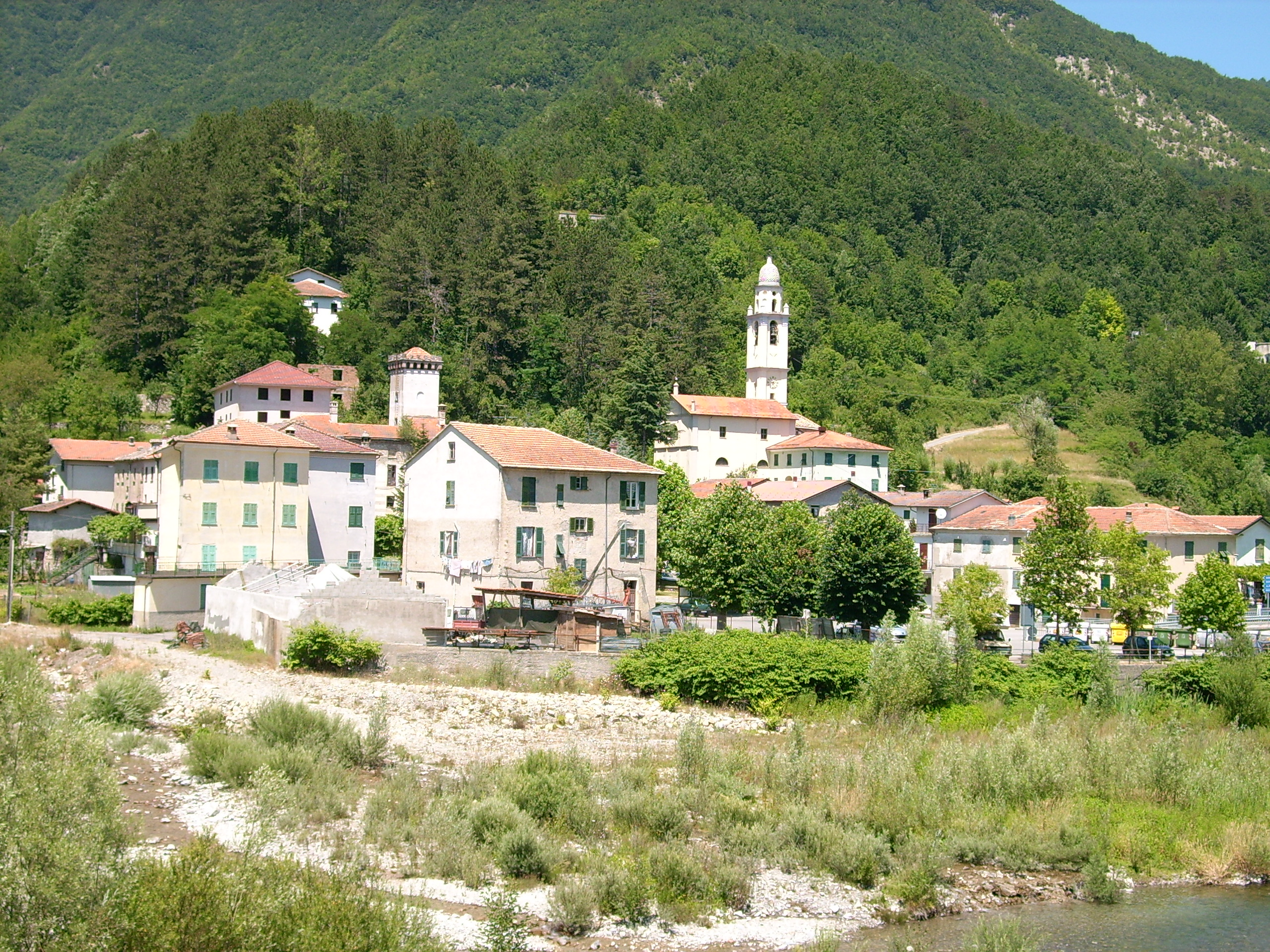

- Coat of arms

- Location within Italy Location within Liguria
- Coordinates: 44°36′N 9°18′E
- Country: Italy
- Region: Liguria
- Metropolitan city: Genoa (GE)
- Frazioni: Alpe di Gorreto, Borgo, Bosco, Canneto, Fontanarossa, Pissino, Varni

Government
  - Mayor: Sergio Gian Carlo Capelli

Area
  - Total: 18.6 km^{2} (7.2 sq mi)
- Elevation: 533 m (1,749 ft)

Population (31 August 2017)
  - Total: 93
  - Density: 5.0/km^{2} (13/sq mi)
- Demonym: Gorretesi
- Time zone: UTC+1 (CET)
  - Summer (DST): UTC+2 (CEST)
- Postal code: 16020
- Dialing code: 010
- Website: Official website

Gorreto (Ligurian and Bobbiese: O Gorrëio) is a comune (municipality) in the Metropolitan City of Genoa in the Italian region Liguria, located about 35 kilometres (22 mi) northeast of Genoa.

Gorreto borders the following municipalities: Carrega Ligure, Fascia, Ottone, Rovegno.

== See also ==
- Parco naturale regionale dell'Antola
