= Fascia, Liguria =

Fascia
- Comune
- Comune di Fascia
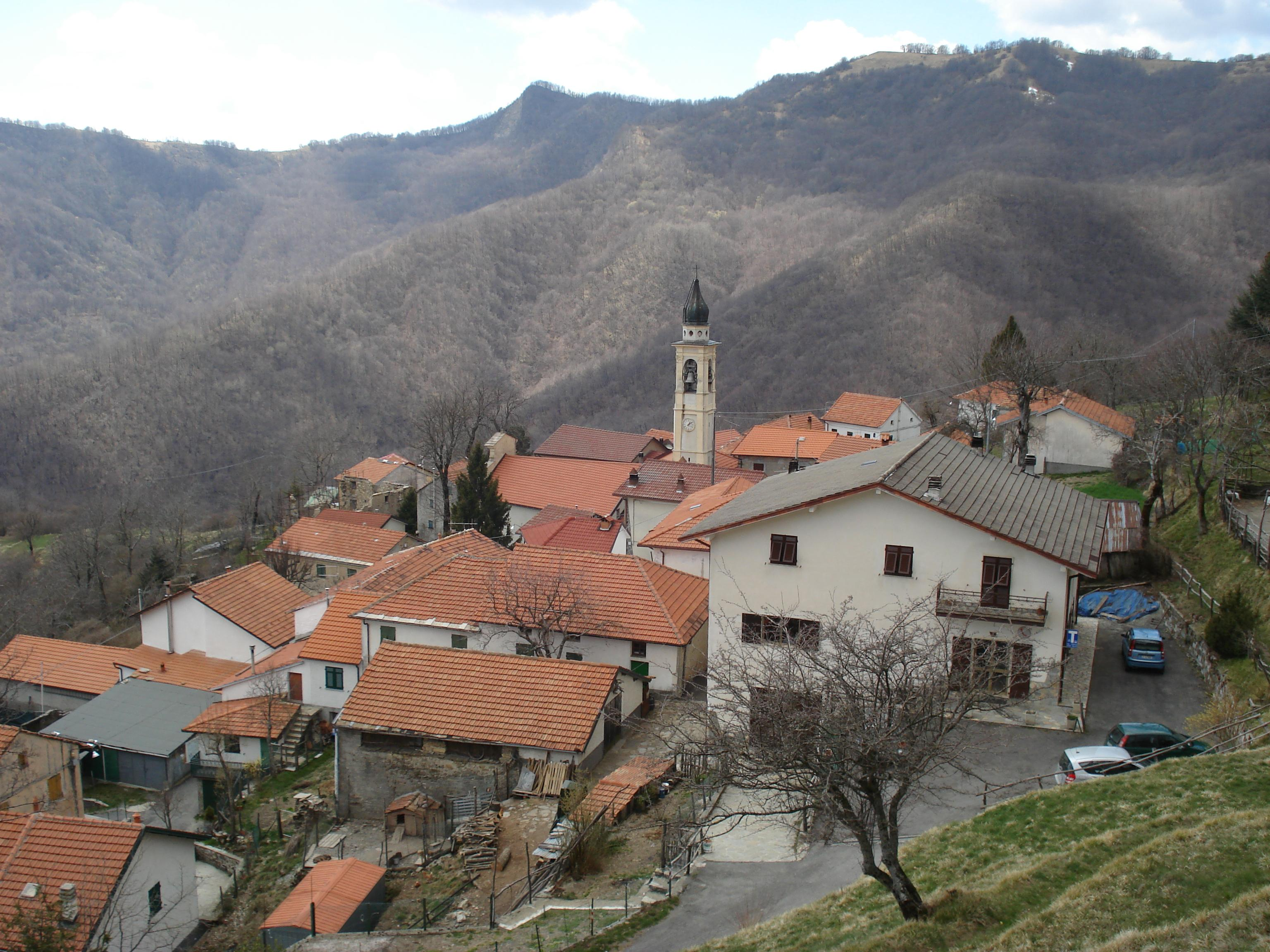

- Coat of arms

- Location within Italy Location within Liguria
- Coordinates: 44°35′N 9°13′E
- Country: Italy
- Region: Liguria
- Metropolitan city: Genoa (GE)
- Frazioni: Carpeneto, Cassingheno

Government
  - Mayor: Marco Gallizia

Area
  - Total: 11.25 km^{2} (4.34 sq mi)
- Elevation: 1,118 m (3,668 ft)

Population (31 May 2021)
  - Total: 70
  - Density: 6.2/km^{2} (16/sq mi)
- Demonym: Fasciotti
- Time zone: UTC+1 (CET)
  - Summer (DST): UTC+2 (CEST)
- Postal code: 16020
- Dialing code: 010
- Website: Official website

Fascia is a comune (municipality) in the Metropolitan City of Genoa in the Italian region Liguria, located about 30 kilometres (19 mi) northeast of Genoa.

The town is located on the slopes of the Monte Carmo, which separates the Trebbia and Borbera valleys. The municipality borders the following municipalities: Carrega Ligure, Fontanigorda, Gorreto, Montebruno, Propata, Rondanina, Rovegno.

== See also ==
- Parco naturale regionale dell'Antola
