= ATP Esercizio =

Italian transport company

ATP Esercizio Srl
- Type: Srl
- Industry: Transport
- Founded: 1976 as Tigullio Pubblici Trasporti Spa, 2012 as ATP Esercizio Srl
- Fate: Ceased operations 1 January 2021 (merger into AMT Genova)
- Headquarters: Carasco, Genoa, Italy
- Website: atpesercizio.it/

ATP Esercizio Srl was an Italian public transport company operating in 67 small cities near Genoa, Italy. The major shareholder of the company is the Province of Genova (66,16%). The company operates under its owner ATP Azienda Trasporti Provinciali Spa.

== History ==
ATP Esercizio Srl was founded in the beginning of 2012 by the merging of two transport companies: Tigullio Pubblici Trasporti Spa, founded in 1976 and operating in Chiavari, and ALI Autolinee Liguri Provincia di Genova Spa, founded on 2 June 2000.

On the 1st January 2021, ATP Esercizio effectively merged into AMT Genova in its entirety; with its services and staff now being part of the latter operator.
