= Mezzanego =

Mezzanego Mezanego
- Comune
- Comune di Mezzanego
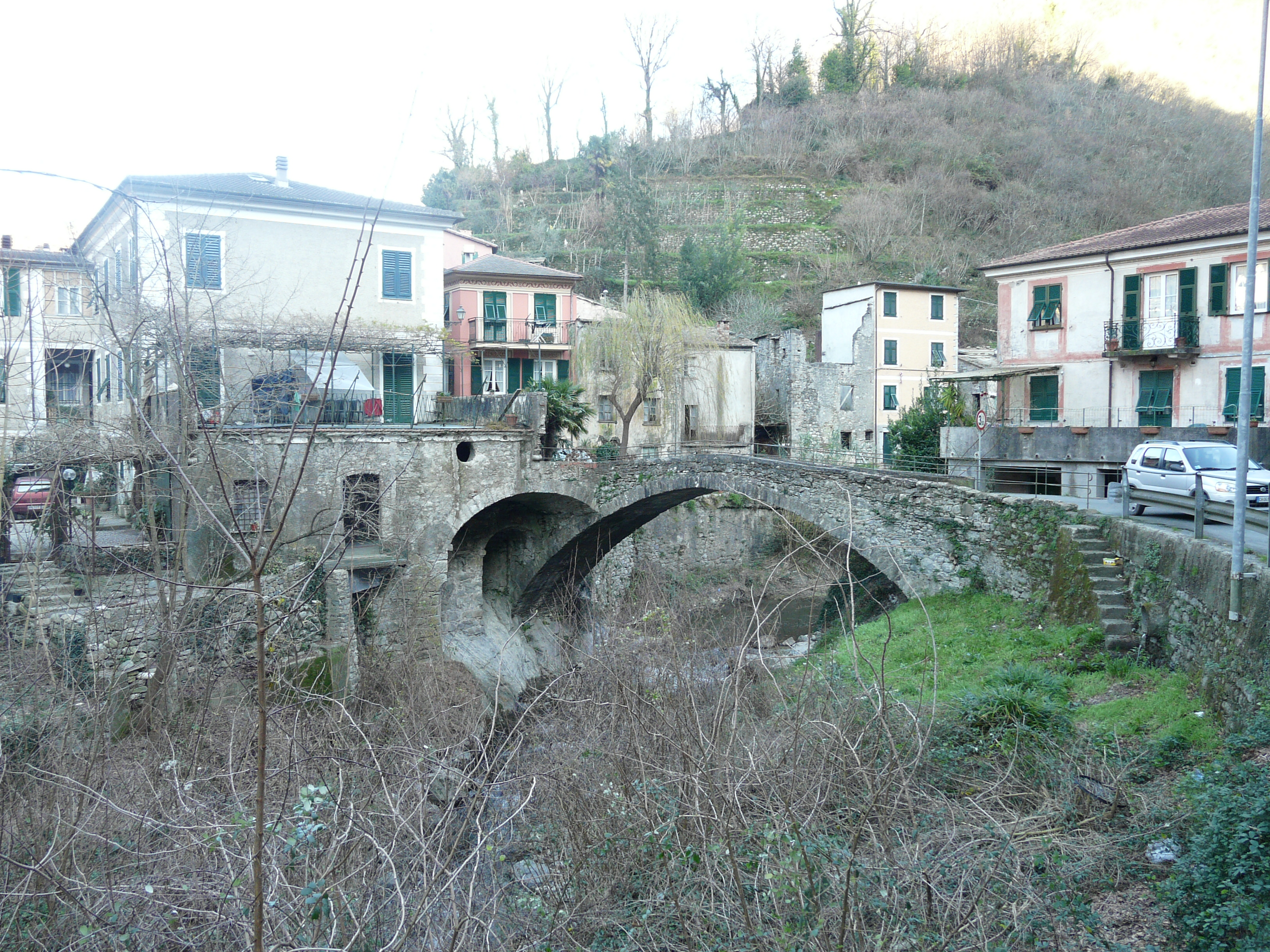
- Rocca castle, in the frazione of Borgonovo Ligure.

- Coat of arms

- Location within Italy Location within Liguria
- Coordinates: 44°23′N 9°23′E
- Country: Italy
- Region: Liguria
- Metropolitan city: Genoa (GE)
- Frazioni: Borgonovo Ligure, Case Zatta, Corerallo, Isola di Borgonovo, Passo del Bocco, Pontegiacomo, Porciletto, Prati di Mezzanego, Mezzanego Alto, San Siro Foce, Semovigo, Vignolo

Government
  - Mayor: Danilo Repetto

Area
  - Total: 28.65 km^{2} (11.06 sq mi)
- Elevation: 83 m (272 ft)

Population (31 May 2022)
  - Total: 1,489
  - Density: 51.97/km^{2} (134.6/sq mi)
- Demonym: Mezzaneghesi
- Time zone: UTC+1 (CET)
  - Summer (DST): UTC+2 (CEST)
- Postal code: 16046
- Dialing code: 0185
- Website: Official website

Mezzanego (Ligurian: Mezanego) is a comune (municipality) in the Metropolitan City of Genoa in the Italian region Liguria, located about 35 kilometres (22 miles) east of Genoa.

== Location ==
The town is situated on the river Sturla in a valley of the same name. The distance to the Ligurian capital Genua is about 57 kilometres (35 miles).

Mezzanego borders the following municipalities: Borzonasca, Carasco, Ne, San Colombano Certénoli, Tornolo.
