= Chiavari railway station =

Railway station in Italy

Chiavari
- The passenger building.

General information
- Location: Corso Angelo Gianelli; 16043 Chiavari GE; Chiavari, Genoa, Liguria; Italy
- Coordinates: 44°18′54″N 09°19′21″E
- Operator: Rete Ferroviaria Italiana; Centostazioni
- Line: Pisa–La Spezia–Genoa
- Distance: 37.654 km (23.397 mi) from Genova Piazza Principe
- Train operators: Trenitalia
- Connections: Urban (ATP) and suburban (ATP) buses

Other information
- Classification: Silver

History
- Opened: 23 November 1868; 157 years ago
Location
- Location within Northern Italy

Chiavari railway station (Italian: Stazione di Chiavari) serves the town and comune of Chiavari, in the Liguria region, northwestern Italy. Opened in 1868, it forms part of the Pisa–La Spezia–Genoa railway, and is situated between La Spezia and Genoa.

The station is currently managed by Rete Ferroviaria Italiana (RFI). However, the commercial area of the passenger building is managed by Centostazioni. Train services to and from the station are operated by Trenitalia. Each of these companies is a subsidiary of Ferrovie dello Stato (FS), Italy's state-owned rail company.

== Location ==
The station is located in a passageway between the town centre and the promenade.

Originally, there was a railway bridge linking Piazza Nostra dell'Orto (north of the station) and Piazza Vittorio Leonardi (to the south). In the early seventies, this bridge was demolished and the pedestrian underpass, which connects only the first track, was extended in both directions. Since then, the underpass has been used as a link between the two parts of the city.

== Features ==
The passenger building is a masonry structure on two levels, of which only the ground floor is open to the public. The architecture of the building is original and hard to find at Italian railway stations: it is composed of two buildings joined by a gallery in which there are many amenities for travelers.

The station once had a goods yard with an adjoining goods shed. However, the goods yard has since been dismantled and replaced by a parking lot for FS employees, and the warehouse has been converted to storage. The architecture of the former warehouse is very similar to that of other Italian railway stations.

There are additional buildings, either on one or two levels, housing the RFI technical departments. The architecture of these buildings is very similar to the two bodies that make up the passenger building. The layout of all the buildings is rectangular.

The station yard has three tracks dedicated to passenger service. In detail:

- Track 1 : the main platform for trains towards Pisa;
- Track 2 : used mainly for trains towards Genoa and sometimes used for overtaking or unusual right hand running of trains;
- Track 3 : priority track in both directions.

Tracks 4 and 5 are equipped with a starting signal at the Genoa end, and are sometimes used for the overtaking or stopping of short goods trains. During the process of extending the shelter of the platform 2 shelter, which took place in the early 1970s, the passenger service to Genoa was performed using track 4, which had been temporarily fitted with a wooden platform.

== Passenger and train movements ==
The station has about 3.4 million passenger movements each year. It is served by trains of all categories, from regional to Frecciabianca services. The main destinations are Genova Brignole, La Spezia Centrale, Pisa Centrale, Roma Termini, Milano Centrale and Torino Porta Nuova.

== Interchange ==
In front of the passenger building is a bus stop for urban and suburban buses, operated by AMT Extra (formerly ATP).

== See also ==
- History of rail transport in Italy
- List of railway stations in Liguria
- Rail transport in Italy
- Railway stations in Italy
