= Val Borbera =

Valley in Alessandria Province, Italy

Coordinates: 44.7109°N 8.8880°E

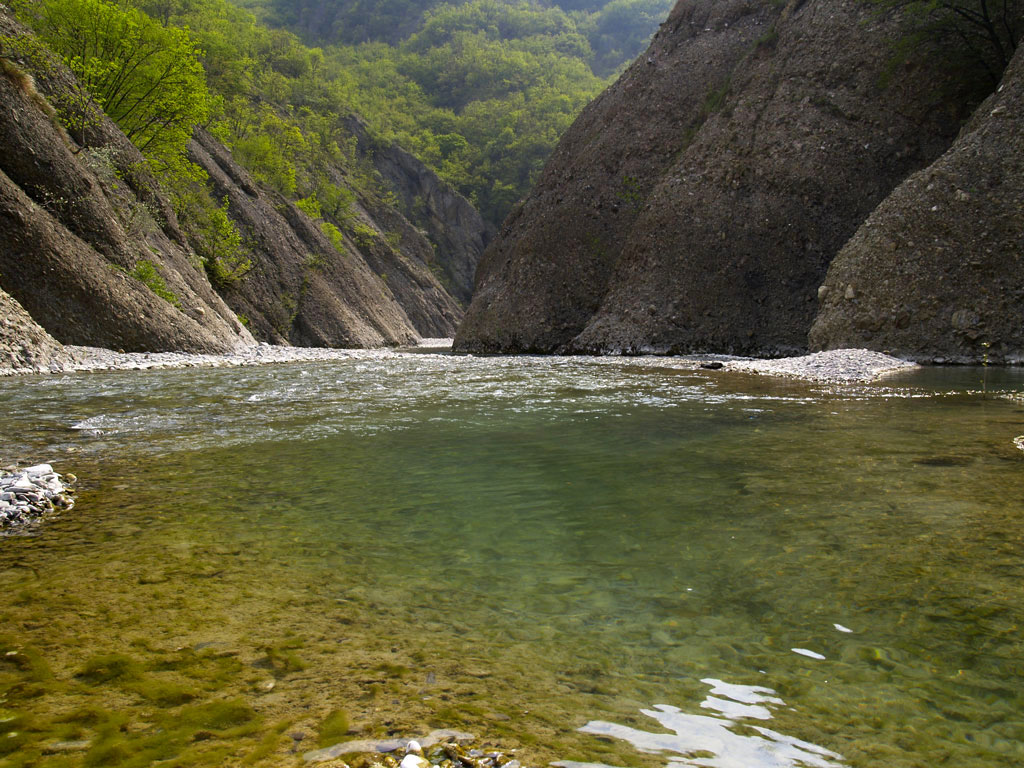
- Borbera River- Canyon Between Upper and Lower Valley

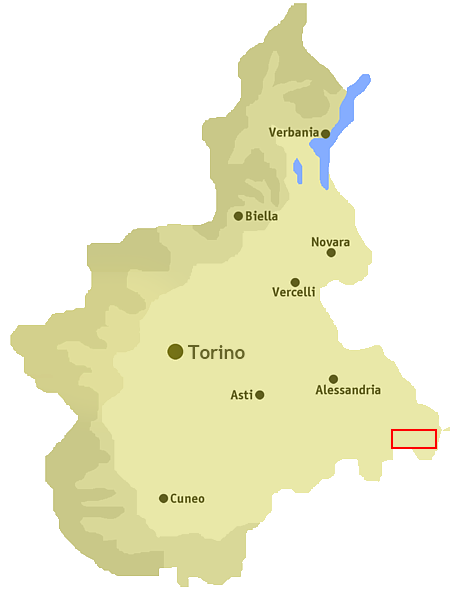
- Location in the Piedmont region

Naming
- Native name: Val Borbëa (Ligurian); Borbéia (Ligurian); Val Borbaja (Piedmontese)

Geography
- Population centers: Borghetto di Borbera, Cantalupo Ligure, Albera Ligure, Cabella Ligure, Carrega Ligure, Mongiardino Ligure, Roccaforte Ligure, Rocchetta Ligure, Stazzano, Vignole Borbera
- Rivers: Borbera

The Val Borbera (Ligurian: Val Borbëa, Borbéia; Piedmontese: Val Borbaja) is a valley formed by the River Borbera, a tributary of the Scrivia, located in the Italian province of Alessandria. It was historically linked to the Republic of Genoa, the Ligurian Republic and is still strongly tied to Liguria.

== Geography ==
This valley is wedged between Val Boreca (Piacenza) to the east; Val Vobbia, Val Brevenna and Alta Val Trebbia (Genoa) and Valle Spinti (Alessandria and Genoa) to the south; and Val Curone, Val Grue and Valley Ossona (Alessandria) to the north. It is bordered to the west by Valle Scrivia.

== History ==
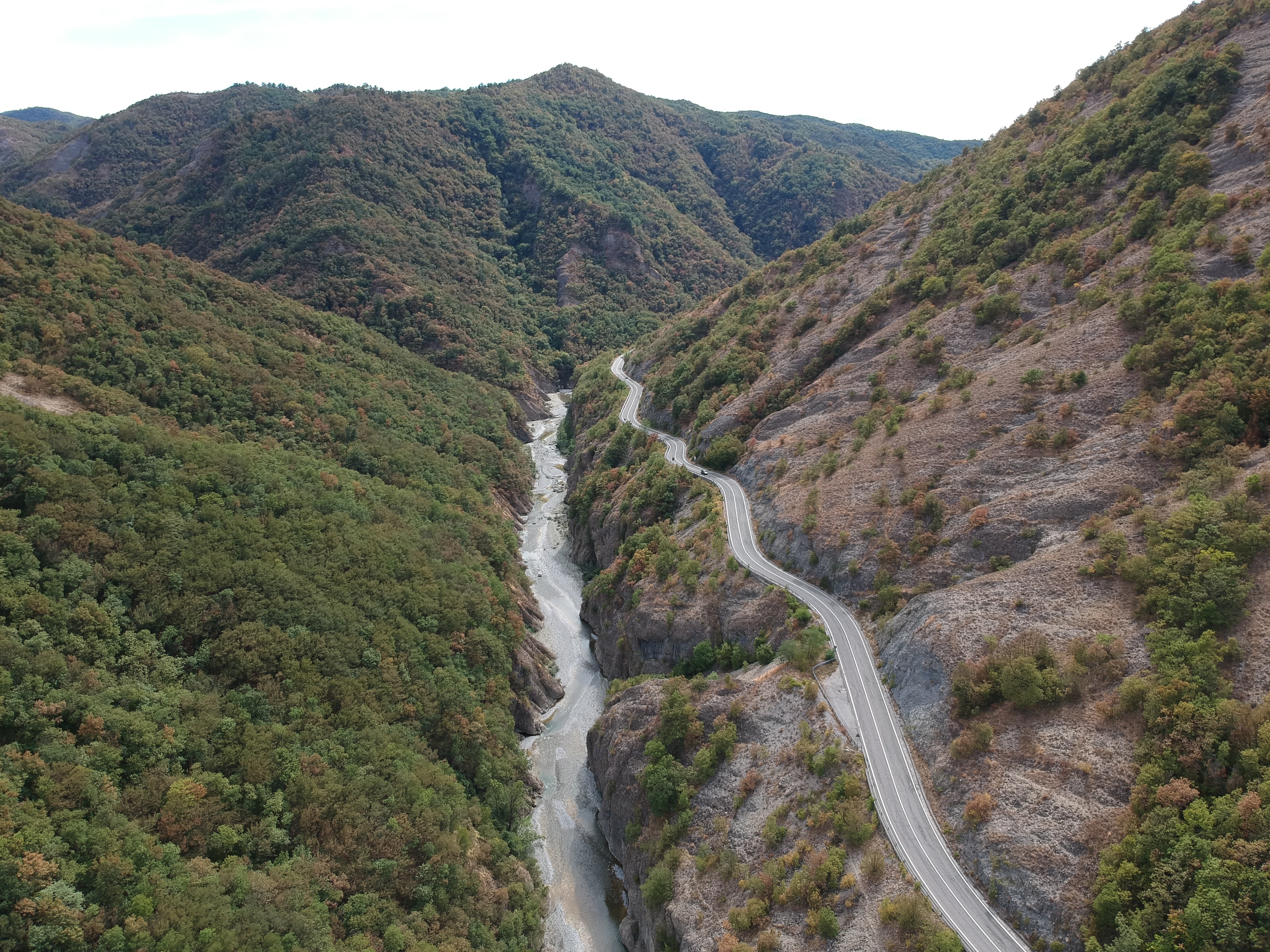
The canyon as seen from above showing the Borbera river and the road paralleling it

The valley is surrounded by high mountains, making it a place isolated from the surrounding valleys, little touched by industrialization and with a well-preserved environment. Up until the beginning of the 20th century, there was no road connecting the upper with the lower valley, the main passageway being the gravel riverbed in the dry season. It is the only valley of Piedmont bordering on the Emilia-Romagna region.

Until about the 1950s, viticulture was very widespread, especially in the lower valley. Today, a special grape variety is still cultivated in the valley, the Timorasso, which is known and appreciated even outside the valley. There are a lot of chestnut woods in the valley, but chestnuts are no longer harvested as before. Also, the water mills in the valley are no longer in operation, so chestnut flour is now produced outside the valley. Val Borbera is also known for a special kind of potatoes, namely the patata quarantina bianca genovese, and the fagiolane, a rather large, white bean that is very appreciated and used gastronomically in the Province of Alessandria.

Its population has been considered a genetic isolate.
