= Borbera =

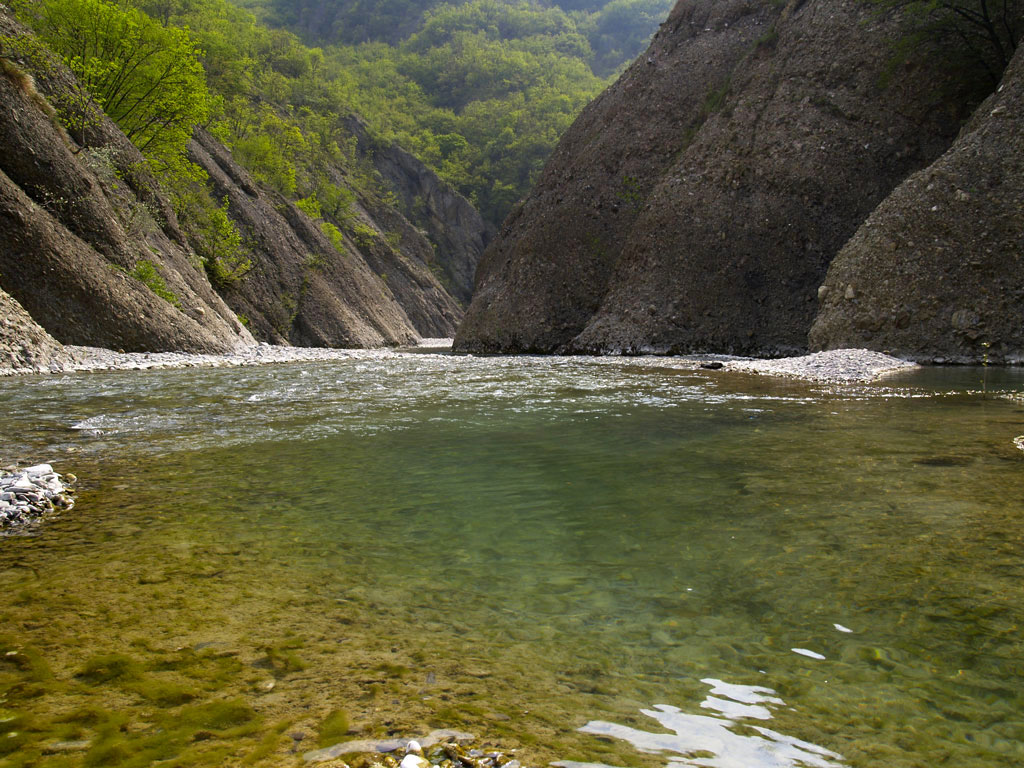
- Borbera between Borghetto di Borbera and Cantalupo Ligure

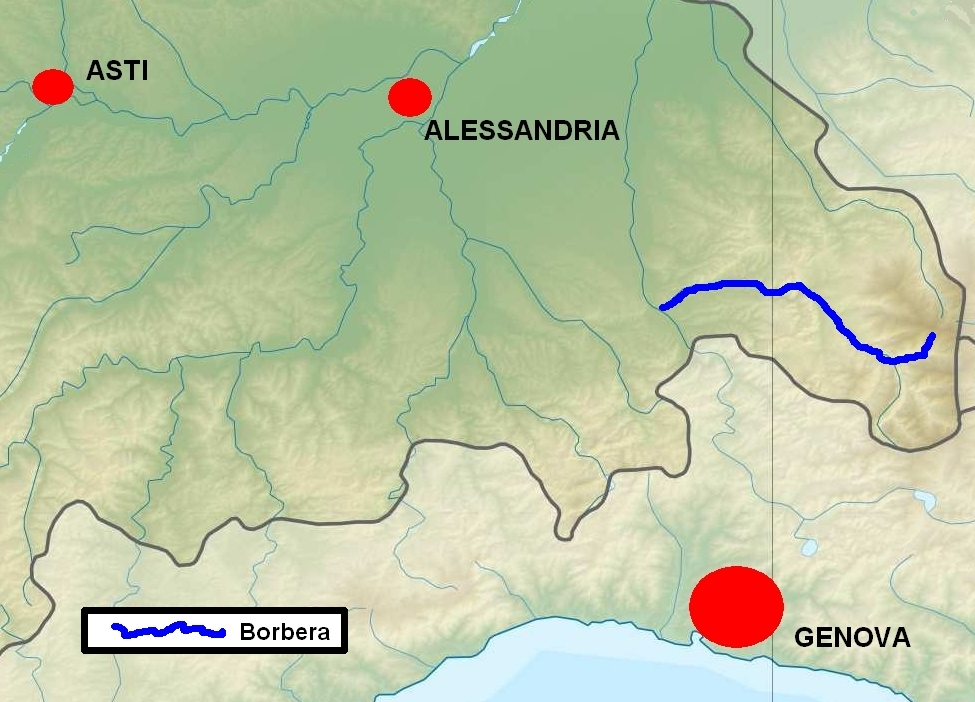
- Location within the southeast Piedmont

Location
- Country: Italy

Physical characteristics
- Source
  - location: Monte Chiappo, Ligurian Alps
  - elevation: about 1,700 m (5,600 ft)
- Mouth
  - location: The Scrivia at Vignole Borbera (Province of Alessandria) in the frazione Precipiano
  - coordinates: 44.7085°N 8.8714°E
  - elevation: 226 m (741 ft)
- Length: 38 km (24 mi)
- Basin size: 212 km^{2} (82 mi^{2})
- Discharge
  - average: 6.5 m^{3}/s (230 cu ft/s)

Basin features
- Progression: Scrivia→ Po→ Adriatic Sea

The Borbera (Borbëa in Ligurian or Borbaja in Piedmontese) is a major torrente (a stream whose flow is marked by a high degree of seasonal variation) of the Province of Alessandria in the Italian region Piedmont. The valley formed by the stream is one of the southeastern-most in the Piedmont region.

== Geography ==
It begins at an elevation of 1,700 metres (5,600 ft) on Monte Chiappo and runs a course of 38 kilometres (24 mi) before flowing into the Scrivia as its major right tributary at Vignole Borbera.

The river passes through the territories of the following communes: Cabella Ligure, Albera Ligure, Rocchetta Ligure, Cantalupo Ligure, Borghetto di Borbera, Vignole Borbera, Stazzano, Arquata Scrivia, Serravalle Scrivia.
