= Chiappini =

Chiappini is an Italian surname. Notable people with the surname include:

- Alessandro Chiappini (born 1969), Italian volleyball coach
- Barbara Chiappini (born 1974), Italian model and actress
- Izabella Chiappini (born 1995), Brazilian water polo player
- Maria Stella Wynn, Lady Newborough (née Chiappini; 1773–1843), Italian-born memoirist, Grand Master of Freemasonry, self-styled legitimate daughter of Louis Philippe II
- Pietro Chiappini (1915–1988), Italian cyclist

== See also ==
- Chiappa
- Monte Chiappo, one of the Apennine Mountains in Italy
