= Libarna =

Former Roman city

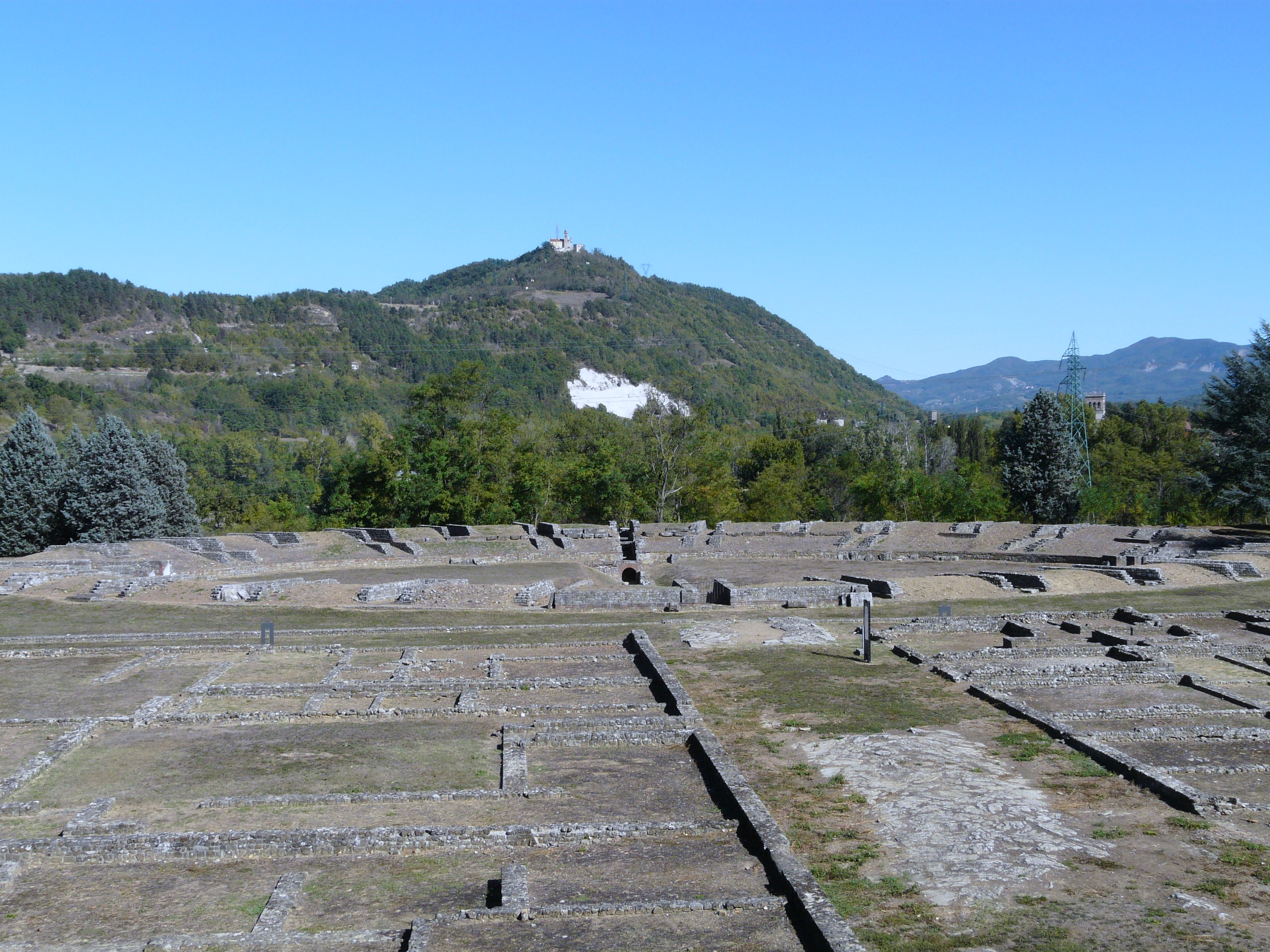
- The remains of the amphitheater and the Roman city - The pilgrimage church of Monte Spineto can also be seen in the background (453 m distance).
- Interactive map of Libarna
- Type: Settlement
- Periods: Roman Republic
- Cultures: Ancient Rome
- Location: Serravalle Scrivia
- Region: Piedmont

History
- Built: 2nd century BC
- Abandoned: 5th century AC

Site notes
- Height: 228
- Excavation dates: 1820
- Owner: Superintendence for the archaeological heritage of Piedmont
- Management: municipality of Serravalle Scrivia
- Public access: Yes
- Website: (in Italian)

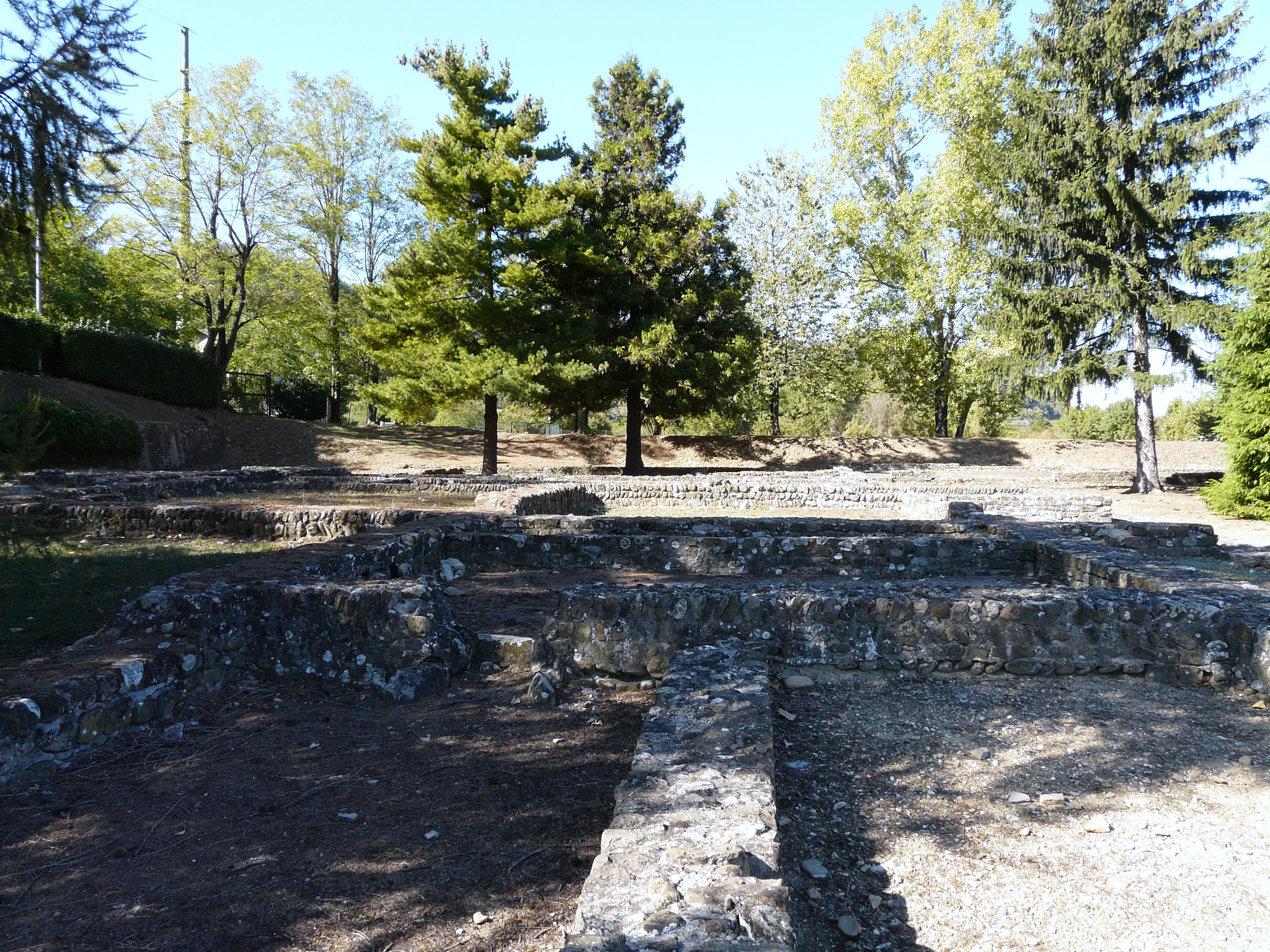
Excavation area of the old Roman city (detail)

Libarna was a Roman city located on the left bank of the Scrivia, on the stretch of the via Postumia between Genua and Dertona. Today Libarna's hamlet is part of the municipality of Serravalle Scrivia, in Alessandria province. Libarna's excavation site is owned by the Italian State, alongside a dedicated museum, also used for musical and artistic events. In 2015 a number of 4565 visitors was recorded at the archaeological site

== History ==
Libarna is first mentioned in the 2nd century BC. The village was initially founded by the Ligurian Dectunini tribe, It is speculated that Libarna could be one of the fifteen Oppidums which according to Roman historian Livy surrendered to the consul Q. Minucius Rufus in 191 BC.

The creation of Via Postumia in 148 BC favoured Libarna's growth, turning the village into an important economic and social centre. After obtaining the legal recognition of Latin citizenship, Libarna became a colony in the 1st century AD reaching its economic and social peak. Following the barbarian invasions Libarna experienced a period of decline until it was completely abandoned in 452, when the inhabitants joined existing communities or founded new ones, such as Precipiano, Serravalle and Arquata.

Libarna is mentioned in some documents found in the monastery of Precipiano (Vignole Borbera) the town is also cited in the Varinella land register of 1544.

The Libarna settlement was discovered and excavated in the eighteenth century alongside various other sites in the Bobbiese and Tortona areas; in the nineteenth century, thanks to the work of the abbot Bottazzi, Libarna historical-topographical classification was ascertained.

Libarna was the autonomous capital of a vast territory which bordered to the east with Velleia, to the south with Genua, to the west with Aquae Statiellae and to the north with Derthona. Located in a particularly fertile area, the agricultural economy was based on viticulture, on tree crops for the exploitation of wood and on cattle breeding. Other activities of the time included the production of ceramics and the brick industry. Thanks to its geographical position it was also an important commercial hub. Although there is no certain information on the existence of religious buildings in the city, from the votive inscriptions found it is clear that the citizens of Libarna were devoted to Jupiter, Diana and Hercules. The imperial cult is also attested to have been present in Libarna.

== Excavations ==
The discovery of the ancient city was accidental, as the ancient city started to surface due to excavation works to build the "Royal Road" in 1820 (today's Strada statale 35 dei Giovi) destined to connect Genoa, which had recently been annexed to the Kingdom of Sardinia, with the capital Turin. Two districts of Libarna have been unearthed near the amphitheatre, measuring 60x65m on each side. The excavation findings are for the most part preserved in the Turin Museum of Antiquities, where among the most valuable works are mosaic floors, marble statues, bronze busts and figured amber.

The city stood on flat land, rich in water, surrounded by hills. It was crossed longitudinally by Via Postumia, which constituted its main axis from northwest to southeast. Another main axis was the decumanus which, oriented from south-west to north-east, led to the amphitheatre. The streets divided the city into many square plots of different sizes. They were paved, rectilinearly with drainage manifolds conveyed towards today's Rio della Pieve. The city received water through an aqueduct, was rich in springs, wells and fountains.

At the meeting point between the two main streets, stood the forum, a large paved square on which there were arcades and buildings, which until now has only been partially explored. The baths were located in the extreme north-east sector and the theatre rose towards the northern limit.
