= Dova Superiore =

- Frazione
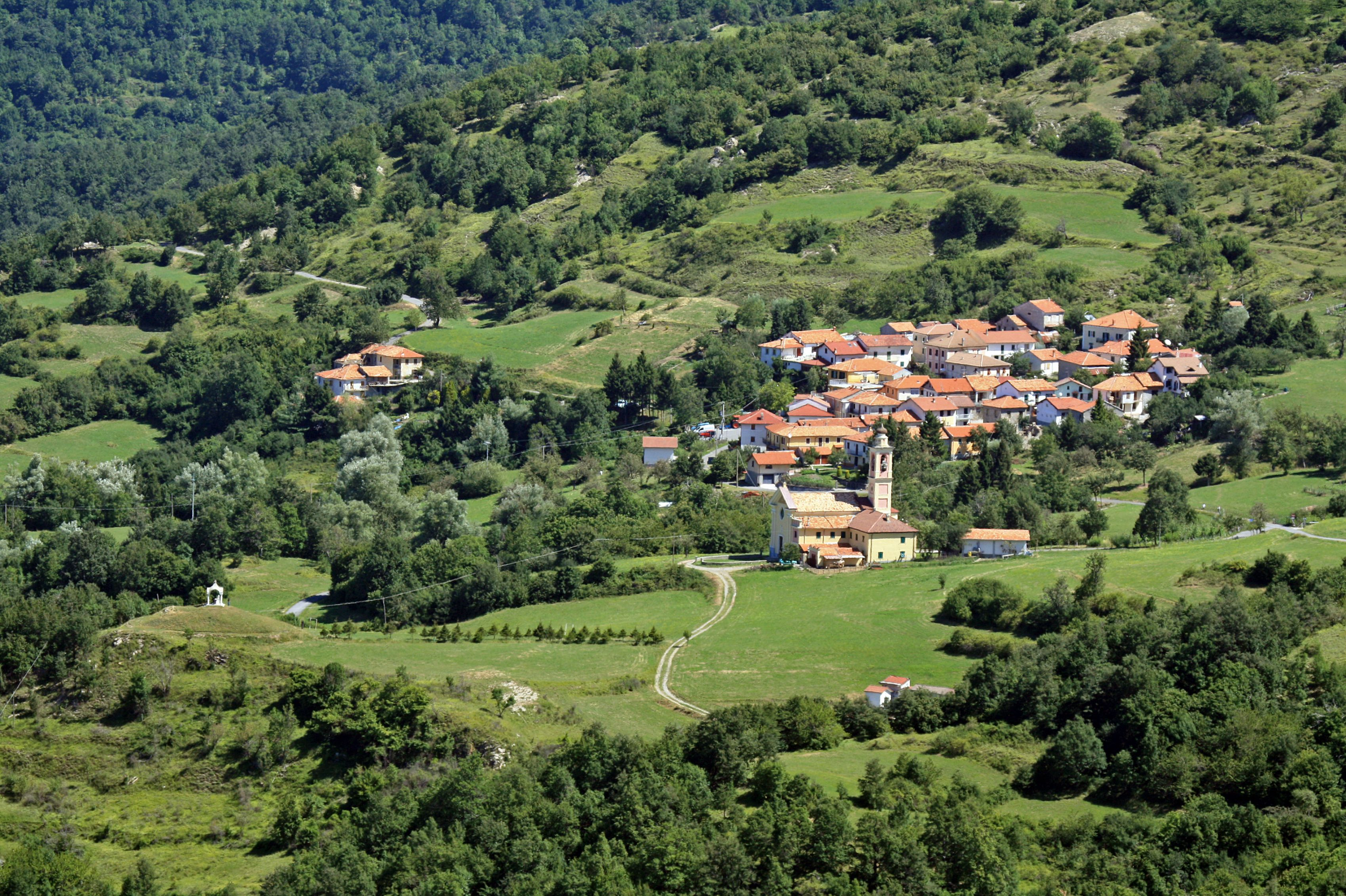
- Dova Superiore

- Location of Dova Superiore in Italy
- Coordinates: 44°40′29″N 9°5′48″E
- Country: Italy
- Region: Piedmont
- Province: Alessandria
- Comune: Cabella Ligure

Population (2012)
  - Total: 46
- Demonym: Dovesi
- Time zone: UTC+1 (CET)
  - Summer (DST): UTC+2 (CEST)
- Postal code: 15060
- Dialing code: 0143
- Patron saint: St Anne
- Website: www.dovasuperiore.it

Dova Superiore is an Italian frazione in Cabella Ligure in the province of Alessandria in Gordenella valley, a tributary of the Borbera river. The hamlet is 60 kilometres (37 miles) from Genoa and 77 kilometres (48 miles) from Alessandria.

== History ==
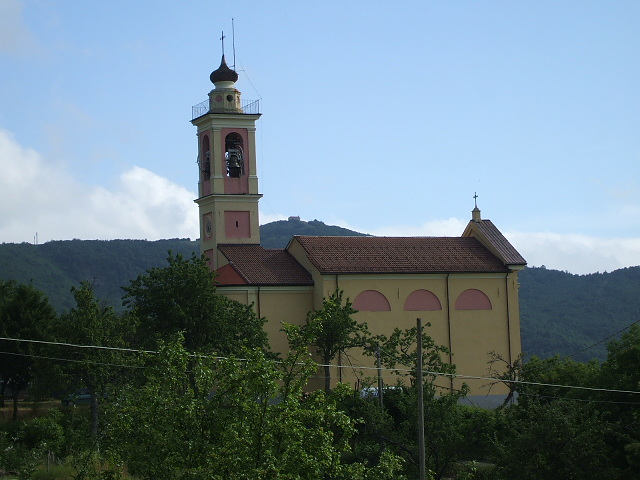
The Church of San Martino

Dova Superiore is first mentioned in 869 when the Emperor, Louis II of Italy gave the settlement to his wife Engelberga as a hunting lodge. It became part of the Imperial fief and was ruled by a number of Genoese noble families, including the Dora, Fieschi and Spinola. It became part of the short-lived Ligurian Republic in 1797, subsequently joining Mongiardino Ligure, became a hamlet in the comune of Mongiardino Ligure until 1958 when it was transferred to Cabella Ligure.

The current parish church, San Martino, was constructed in the latter part of the 19th Century after the old church collapsed in a landslide in 1870. The church is part of the Diocese of Tortona. In 1908, an aqueduct was constructed using pipes from a ship abandoned at the port of Genoa. Electricity arrived in 1934 and in 1948 a small chapel to the Dova Superiore's patron saint, St Anne, was constructed on the hill overlooking the hamlet.

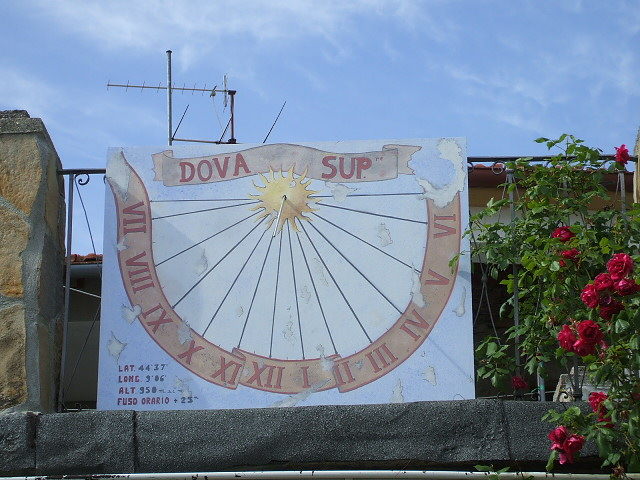
A sundial in Dova Superiore.

== Festivals ==
- July 26 - Feast of St. Anne
- August 9 - Feast of San Fermo
- First Sunday after August 18 - Feast of the Mountain

== Population ==
- 1931: 154
- 1967: 109
- 1978: 95
- 1999: 67
- 2012: 46
