= Amphitheatre of Libarna =

Ancient Roman amphitheater in Libarna, Italy

- Anfiteatro romano di Libarna (Italian)
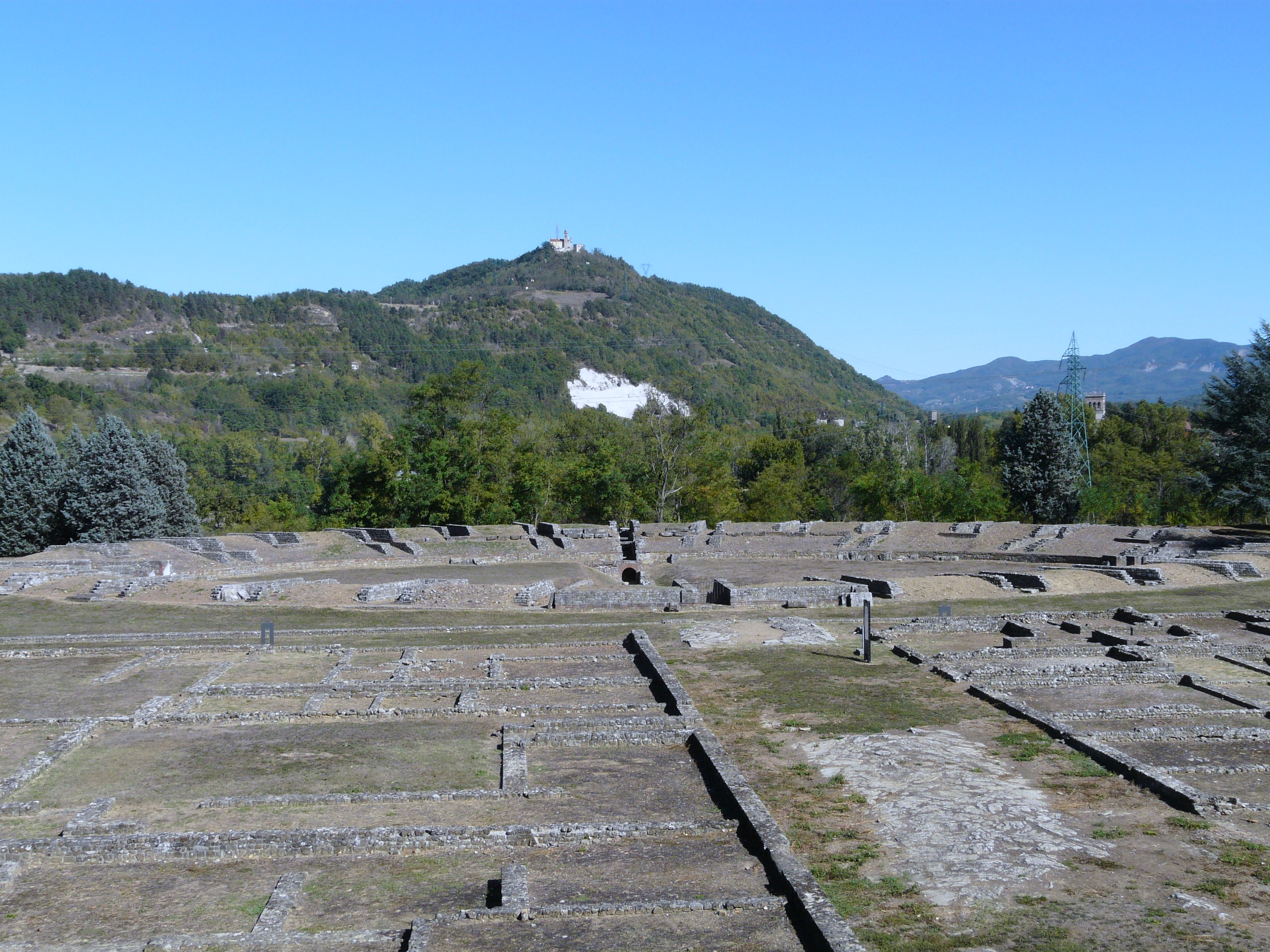
- Interactive map of Amphitheatre of Libarna
- 44.706°N 8.868°E
- Type: amphitheatre
- Cultures: Roman
- Location: Libarna, Italy

Site notes
- Website: www.libarna.al.it/lanfiteatro/ (in Italian)

The Amphitheatre of Libarna is found in the ancient Roman city of Libarna, near the modern town of Serravalle Scrivia, in Piedmont, Italy. It was discovered in excavations throughout the 20th century alongside remains of bath buildings.
