= Isola del Cantone =

- Comune
- Comune di Isola del Cantone
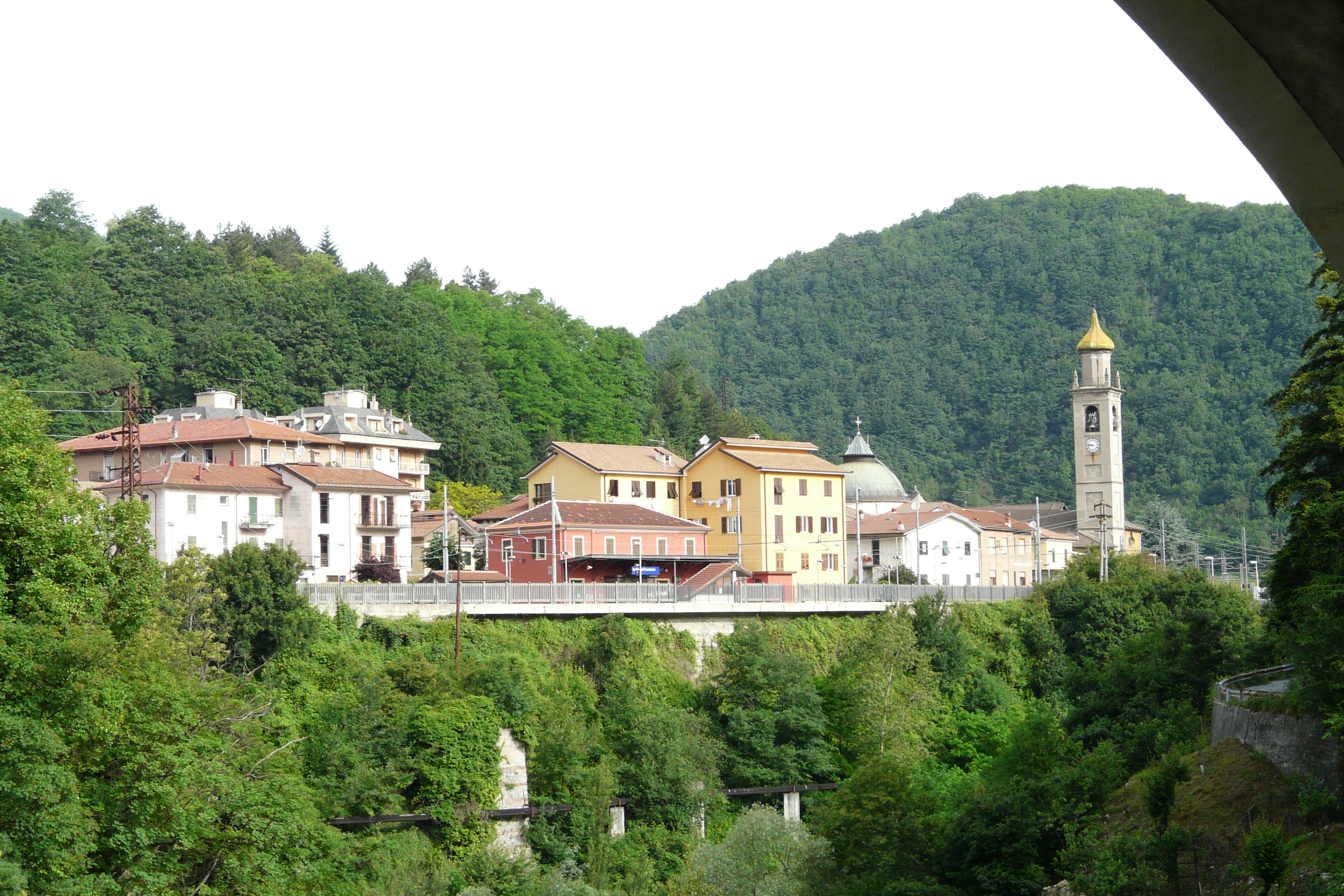
- Isola del Cantone

- Coat of arms

- Location within Italy Location within Liguria
- Coordinates: 44°39′N 8°57′E
- Country: Italy
- Region: Liguria
- Metropolitan city: Genoa (GE)
- Frazioni: Borlasca, Creverina, Griffoglieto, Marmassana, Mereta, Montecanne, Montessoro, Pietrabissara, Prarolo, Vobbietta

Government
  - Mayor: Giulio Assale

Area
  - Total: 47.8 km^{2} (18.5 sq mi)
- Elevation: 296 m (971 ft)

Population (31 December 2014)
  - Total: 1,541
  - Density: 32.2/km^{2} (83.5/sq mi)
- Demonym: Isolesi
- Time zone: UTC+1 (CET)
  - Summer (DST): UTC+2 (CEST)
- Postal code: 16017
- Dialing code: 010
- Website: Official website

Isola del Cantone (Ligurian: L'Isöa do Canton) is a comune (municipality) in the Metropolitan City of Genoa in the Italian region Liguria, located about 25 kilometres (16 mi) north of Genoa.

Isola del Cantone borders the following municipalities: Arquata Scrivia, Busalla, Gavi, Grondona, Mongiardino Ligure, Roccaforte Ligure, Ronco Scrivia, Vobbia, Voltaggio. Media related to Isola del Cantone at Wikimedia Commons
