= Monte Buio =

Mountain in Italy

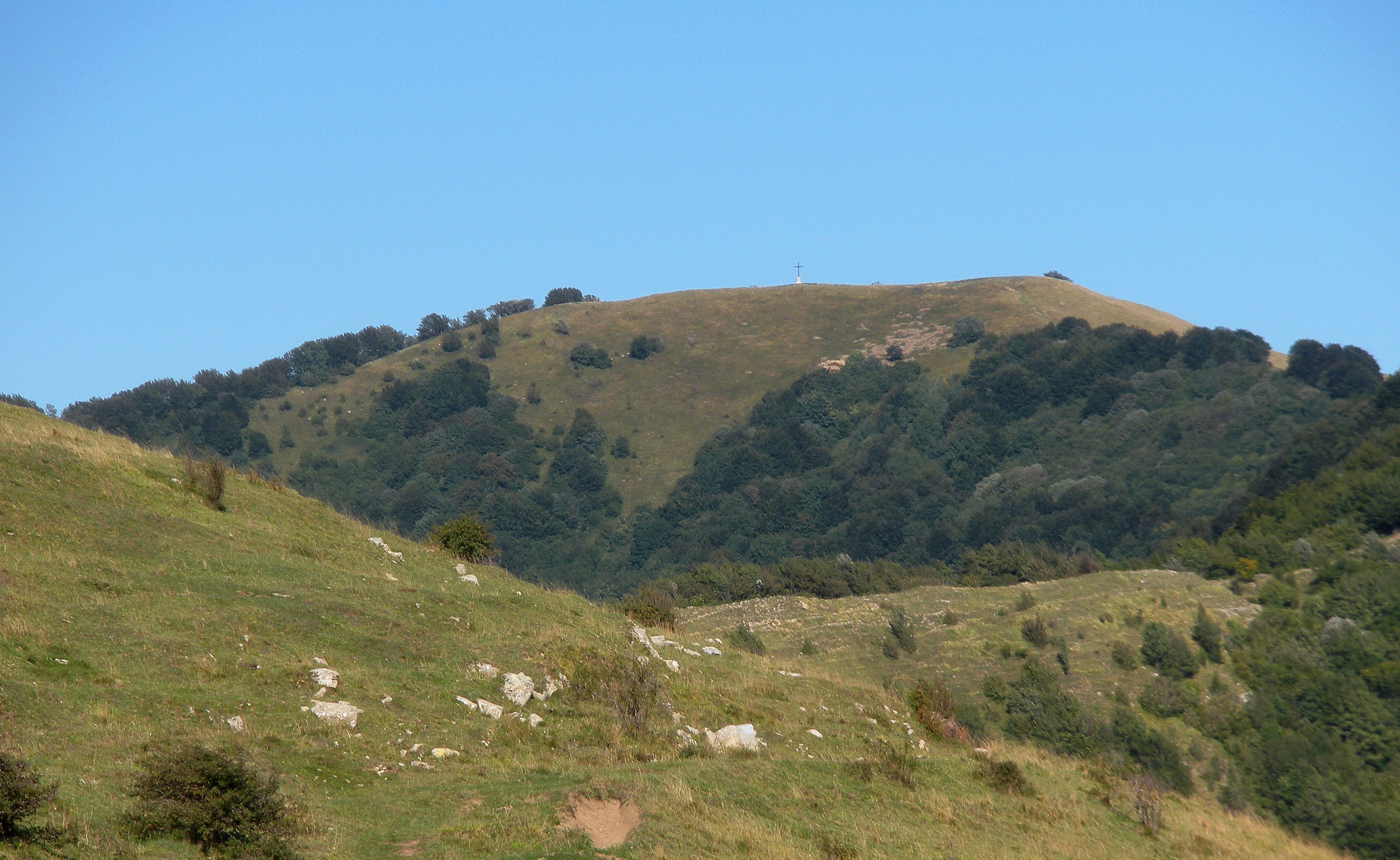
- Monte Buio from Incisa pass

Highest point
- Elevation: 1,400 m (4,600 ft)
- Prominence: 125 m (410 ft)
- Coordinates: 44°34′53.4″N 9°6′41.4″E

Geography
- Location within Italy
- Location: Liguria and Piedmont, Italy
- Parent range: Ligurian Apennines

Climbing
- Easiest route: hiking on waymarked footpath

Monte Buio is a mountain in Liguria, northern Italy, part of the Ligurian Apennines. It is located between the provinces of Genoa and Alessandria. It lies at an altitude of 1400 metres.

== Toponymy ==
Monte in Italian means Mount while Buio means Dark.

== Geography ==
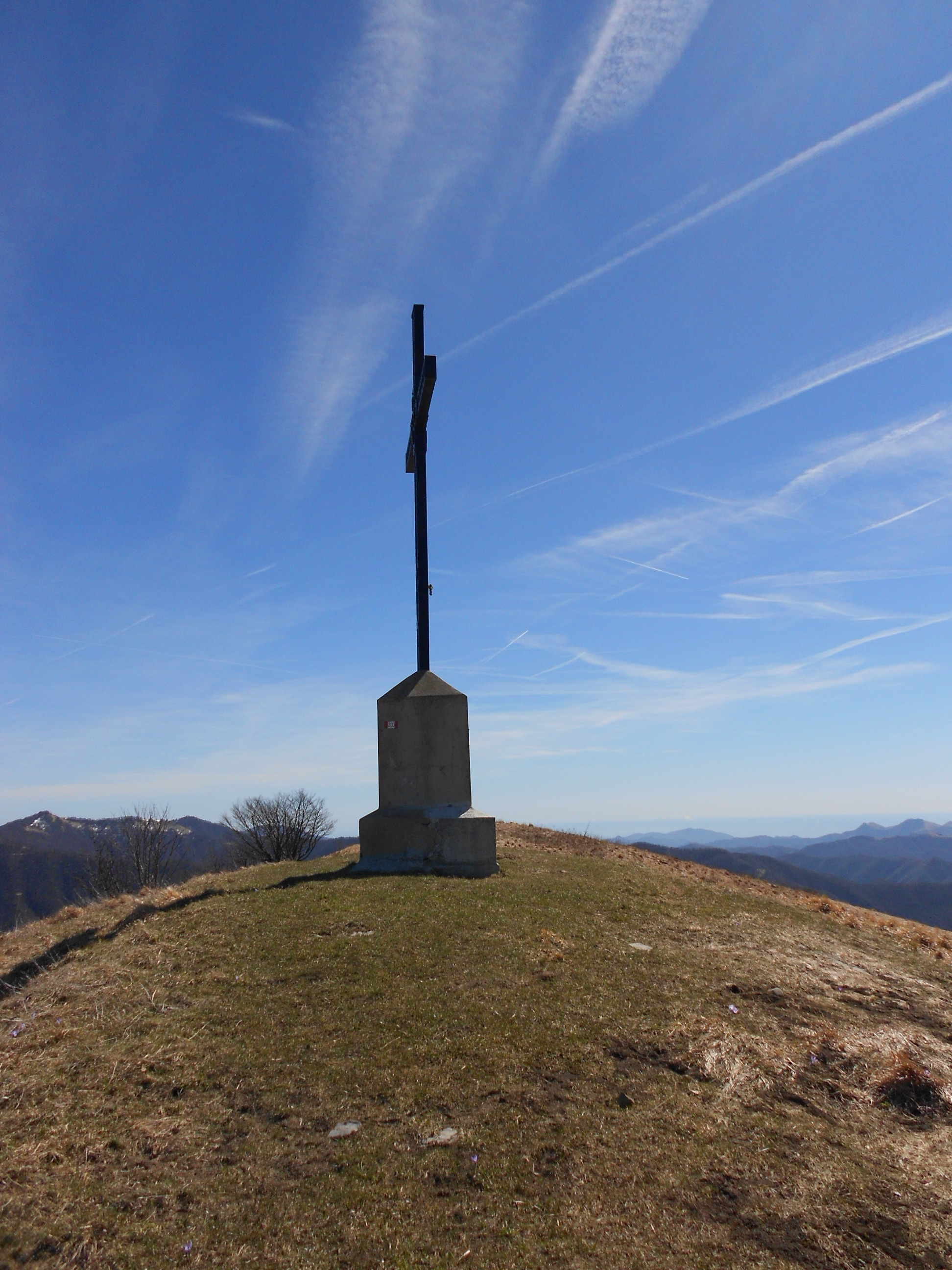
Summit cross of Monte Buio

The mountain has grassy slopes and on its summit stands a large cross. Is a tripoint where the valleys of Brevenna, Borbera and Vobbia meet. A brief ridge connects Monte Buio with monte Antola and the Ligurian Sea/Adriatic Sea water divide. The Monte Buio overlooks the Val Vobbia.

== Access to the summit ==
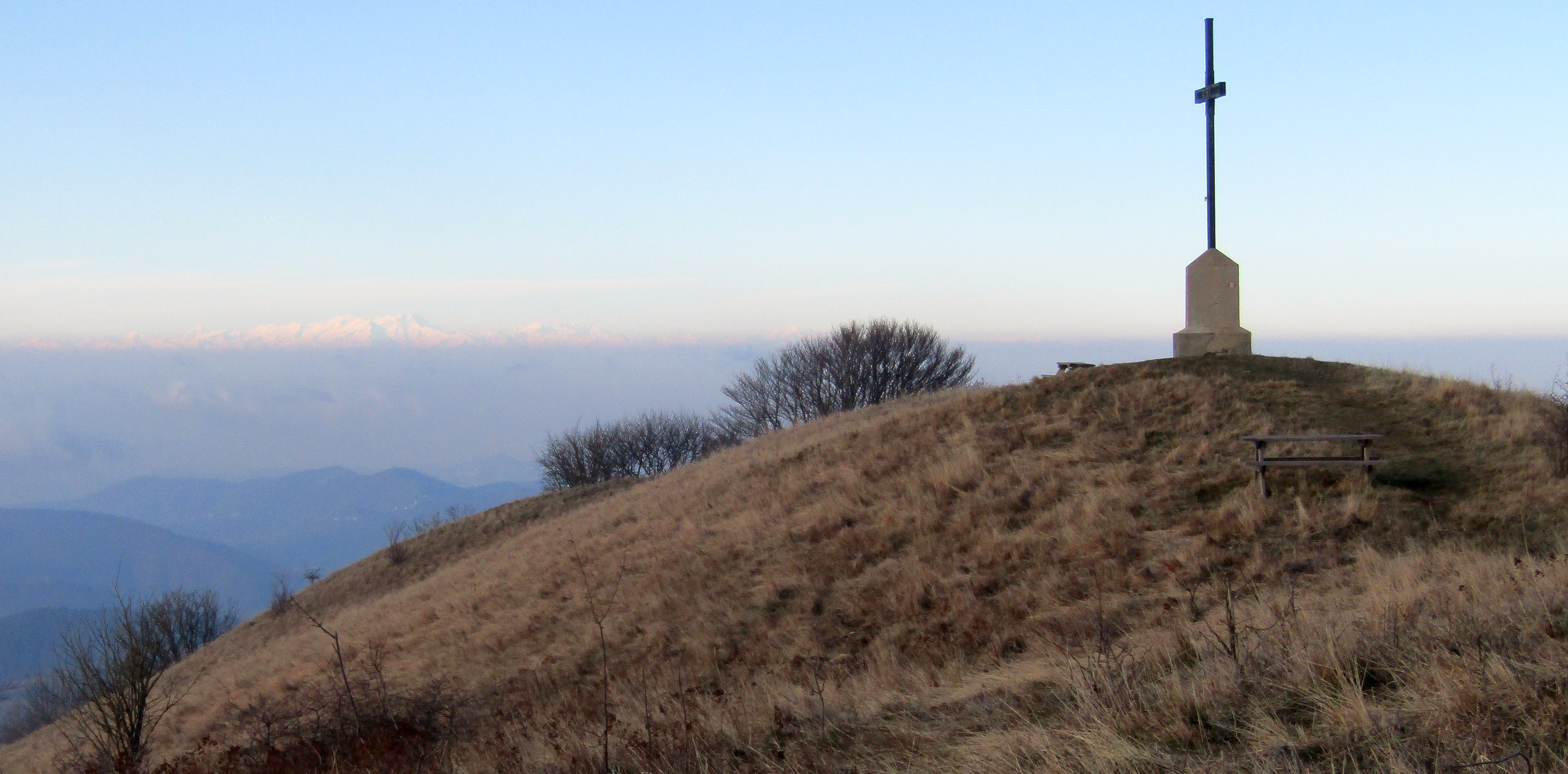
View on Monte Rosa (left of the cross)

There are several hiking paths reaching the summit of Monte Buio, starting from Alpe and Vallenzona (two villages of the comune of Vobbia), from Tonno (Valbrevenna) and from the mountain passes of the Incisa and San Fermo.

The summit offers a good point of view on the nearby valleys and from it also the Ligurian Sea and a large stretch of the Western Alps can be seen.

== Conservation ==
The Ligurian side of the mountain since 1989 is included in the Parco naturale regionale dell'Antola while the Piedmontese one is part of the Parco naturale dell'Alta val Borbera.

== Bibliography ==
- Andrea Parodi, Alessio Schiavi (2015). La catena dell'Antola. 113 escursioni fra Scrivia, Trebia e Oltrepo sui monti delle quattro province (in Italian). Andrea Parodi Editore. ISBN 978-88-8887-316-9.
