= Carrega Ligure =

- Comune
- Comune di Carrega Ligure
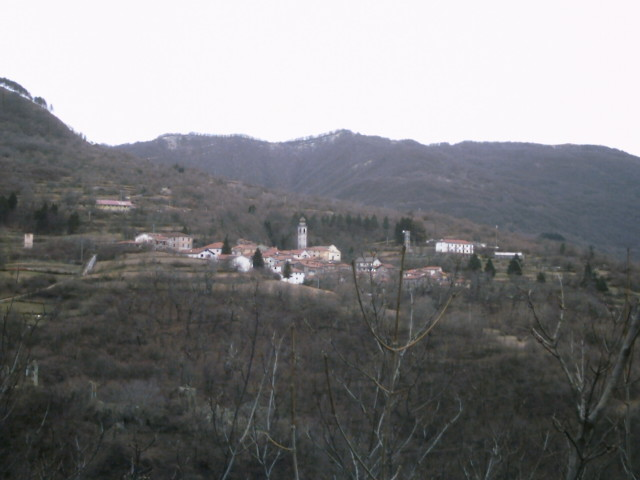

- Coat of arms

- Location within Italy Location within Piedmont
- Coordinates: 44°37′N 9°11′E
- Country: Italy
- Region: Piedmont
- Province: Alessandria (AL)
- Frazioni: Connio, Fontanachiusa, Magioncalda, Cartasegna, Daglio, Vegni, Agneto, Berga, Campassi, Capanne di Carrega, Croso, Boglianca, Cà di Campassi

Government
  - Mayor: Luca Silvestri

Area
  - Total: 55.26 km^{2} (21.34 sq mi)
- Elevation: 958 m (3,143 ft)

Population (31 May 2021)
  - Total: 150
  - Density: 2.7/km^{2} (7.0/sq mi)
- Demonym: Carreghini
- Time zone: UTC+1 (CET)
  - Summer (DST): UTC+2 (CEST)
- Postal code: 15060
- Dialing code: 0143
- Patron saint: St. Julian
- Saint day: 9 January
- Website: Official website

Carrega Ligure is a comune (municipality) in the Province of Alessandria in the Italian region Piedmont, located about 130 kilometres (81 mi) southeast of Turin and about 60 kilometres (37 mi) southeast of Alessandria, in the upper Ligurian Apennines in the Val Borbera.

Carrega Ligure borders the following municipalities: Cabella Ligure, Fascia, Gorreto, Mongiardino Ligure, Ottone, Propata, Valbrevenna, and Vobbia.
