= Mongiardino =

Mongiardino may refer to:

- Lorenzo Mongiardino, Italian architect, interior designer and production designer
- Mongiardino Ligure, comune in the Province of Alessandria in the Italian region Piedmont
