= Dova =

Dova may refer to:

- Dua, a Muslim prayer
- Dimitra Dova, Greek sprinter
- Francisco Dova, Argentine sprinter
- María Teresa Dova, Argentine physicist
- Department of Veteran Affairs, a department in many countries regarding veterans

== See also ==
- Dova Haw, an island in England
- Dova DV-1 Skylark, a light aircraft
- Dova Superiore, a frazione in Italy
