= Brevenna =

Stream in Liguria, Italy

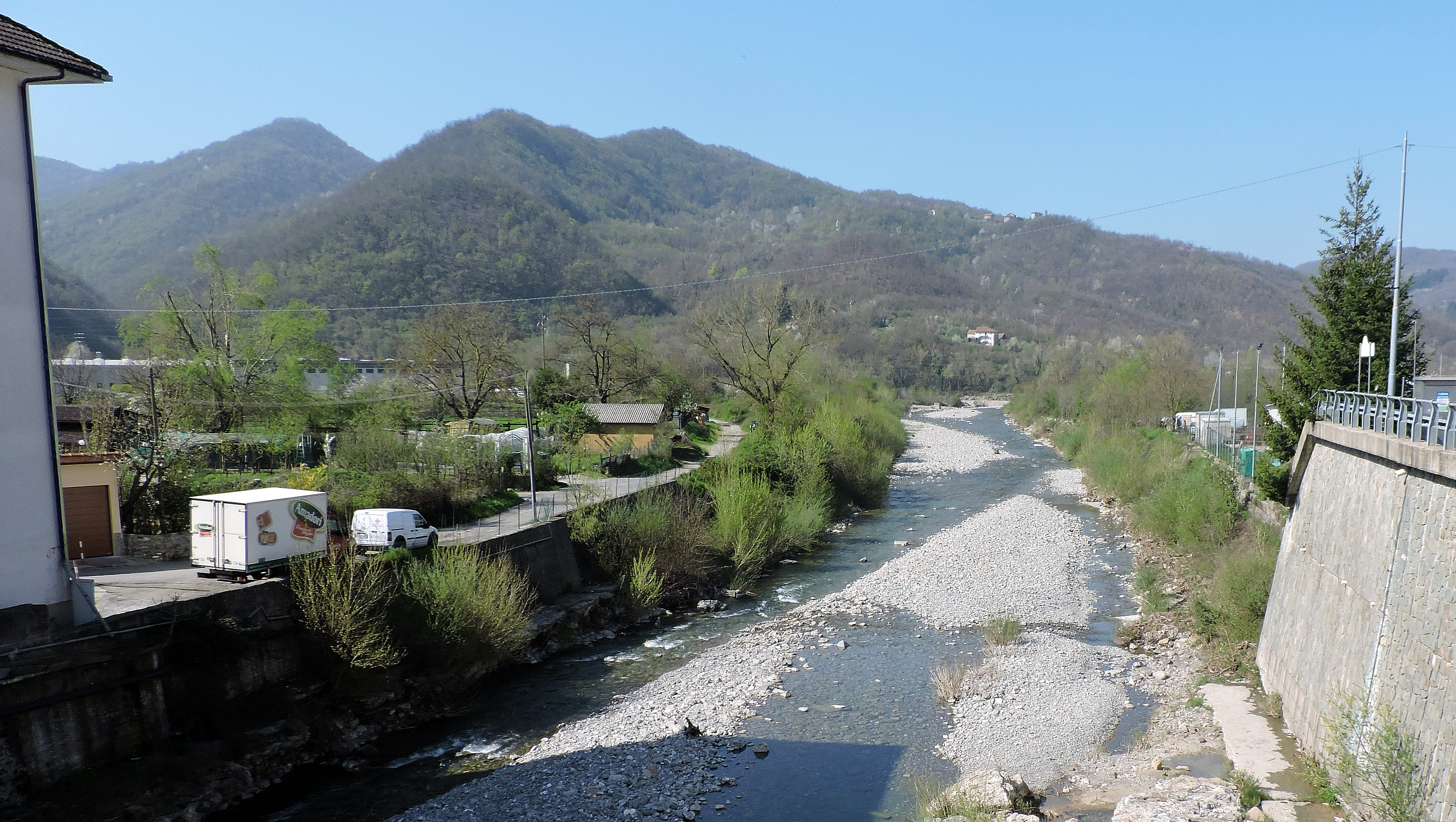
- The creek near its mouth

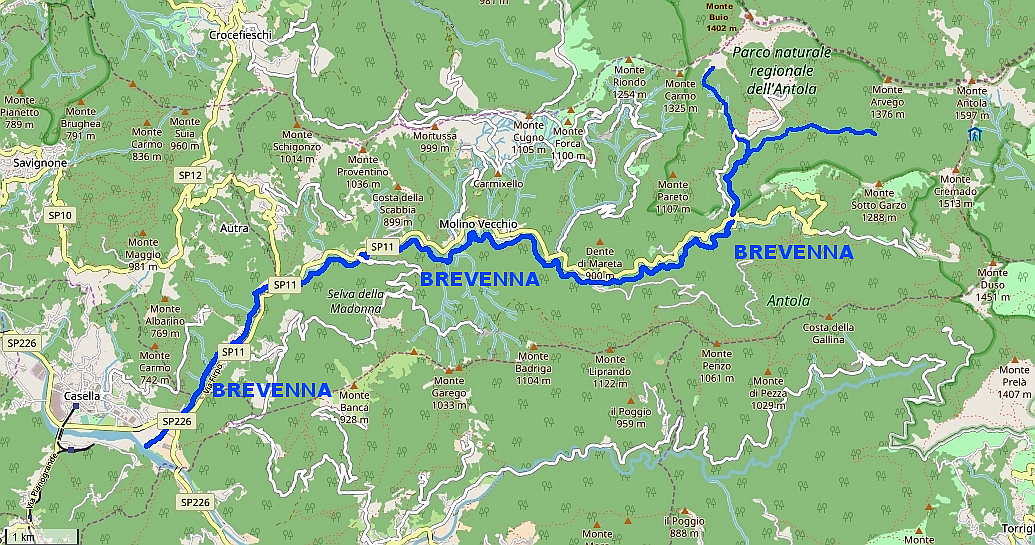

Location
- Country: Italy

Physical characteristics
- Source
  - location: Ligurian Apennine
- Mouth
  - location: Scrivia near Casella (GE)
  - coordinates: 44°31′45.41″N 9°00′25.92″E
- Length: 16.138 km (10.028 mi)
- Basin size: 57 km^{2} (22 mi^{2})

Basin features
- Progression: Scrivia

The Brevenna is a 16.138-kilometre (10.028 mi) creek (in Italian torrente) of Liguria, Italy.

== Etymology ==
The origin of the name Brevenna is certainly not Latin, and may not be Indo-European or Germanic. Linguists connect it to brev, a pre Indo-European root meaning stiff from cold. Sometimes the name of the creek is considered to be of feminine gender (la Brevenna) (mainly in old documents).

== River course ==
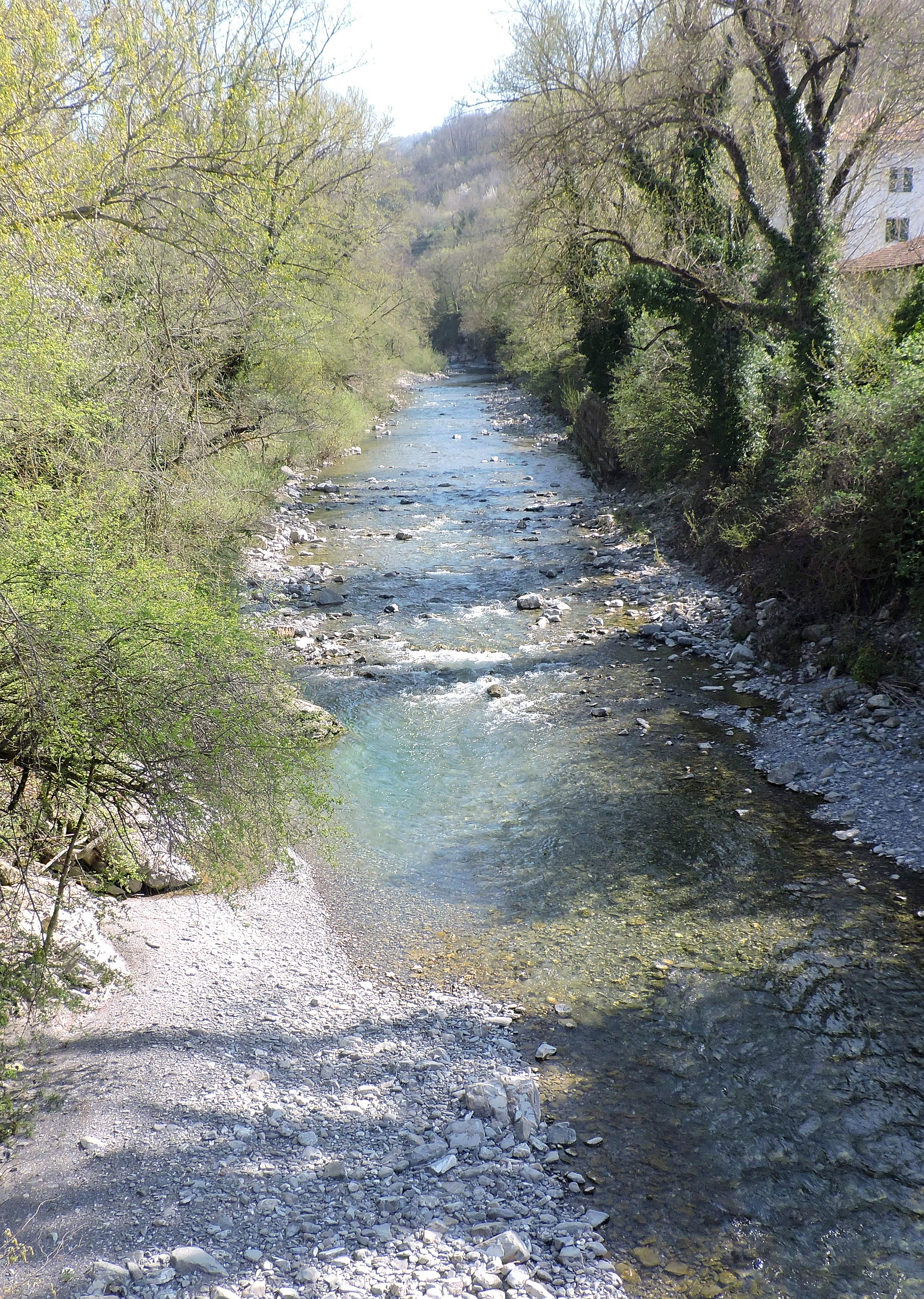
The Brevenna near Casella

The creek is formed near the village of Tonno (comune of Valbrevenna) from the union of rio di Tonno (coming from Monte Antola) with rio dell'Orso, which collects the waters descending the southern slopes of Monte Buio. After a brief stretch heading south the Brevenna receives the rio Senarega from its left and then turns west. The following part of its course is rather meandering and reaches Molino Vecchio, the administrative centre of Valbrevenna. Downstream from the village, the Brevenna turns southeast and, flanked for a long stretch by the provincial road nr.11, it ends up at the Scrivia not far from the centre of Casella. The confluence elevation is 402 m.s.l.

== History ==
The creek collects the waters flowing from a high and woody water basin, so even during the summer, the Brevenna usually has considerable discharge. In former times, this promoted the construction of several water mills along its course. Nowadays, most of these mills are abandoned, except for the one at Porcile, which was restored. This mill is not very close to the Brevenna and is located in the uppermost part of its valley. It works thanks to a big water tank using the waters of a small tributary of the main stream. The uppermost part of the Brevenna watershed is included in Parco naturale regionale dell'Antola.

== Fishing ==
The Brevenna is frequented by fishers and every now and then is artificially enriched with fries.

== See also ==
- List of rivers of Italy

Media related to Brevenna at Wikimedia Commons
