= Grondona, Piedmont =

Grondona
- Comune
- Comune di Grondona
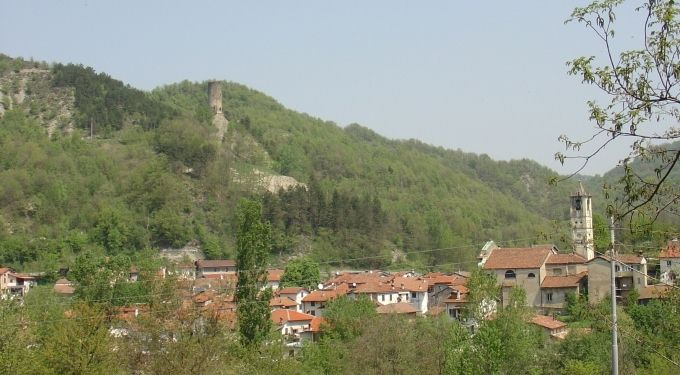

- Location within Italy Location within Piedmont
- Coordinates: 44°42′N 8°58′E
- Country: Italy
- Region: Piedmont
- Province: Province of Alessandria (AL)
- Frazioni: Variana

Area
  - Total: 25.7 km^{2} (9.9 sq mi)
- Elevation: 303 m (994 ft)

Population (Dec. 2004)
  - Total: 548
  - Density: 21.3/km^{2} (55.2/sq mi)
- Demonym: Grondonesi
- Time zone: UTC+1 (CET)
  - Summer (DST): UTC+2 (CEST)
- Postal code: 15060
- Dialing code: 0143

Grondona (Grondonn-a in Ligurian) is a comune (municipality) in the Province of Alessandria in the Italian region Piedmont, located about 110 kilometres (68 mi) southeast of Turin and about 35 kilometres (22 mi) southeast of Alessandria. As of 31 December 2004, it had a population of 548 and an area of 25.7 square kilometres (9.9 mi^{2}).

The municipality of Grondona contains the frazione (subdivision) Variana.

Grondona borders the following municipalities: Arquata Scrivia, Borghetto di Borbera, Isola del Cantone, Roccaforte Ligure, and Vignole Borbera.

== Demographic evolution ==
Historical population

Year	Pop.	±%
1861	1,487	—
1871	1,485	−0.1%
1881	1,348	−9.2%
1901	1,262	−6.4%
1911	1,172	−7.1%

Year	Pop.	±%
1921	1,187	+1.3%
1931	1,047	−11.8%
1936	988	−5.6%
1951	844	−14.6%
1961	728	−13.7%

Year	Pop.	±%
1971	574	−21.2%
1981	517	−9.9%
1991	511	−1.2%
2001	538	+5.3%

Source: Data from ISTAT
