= Creverina =

- Frazione
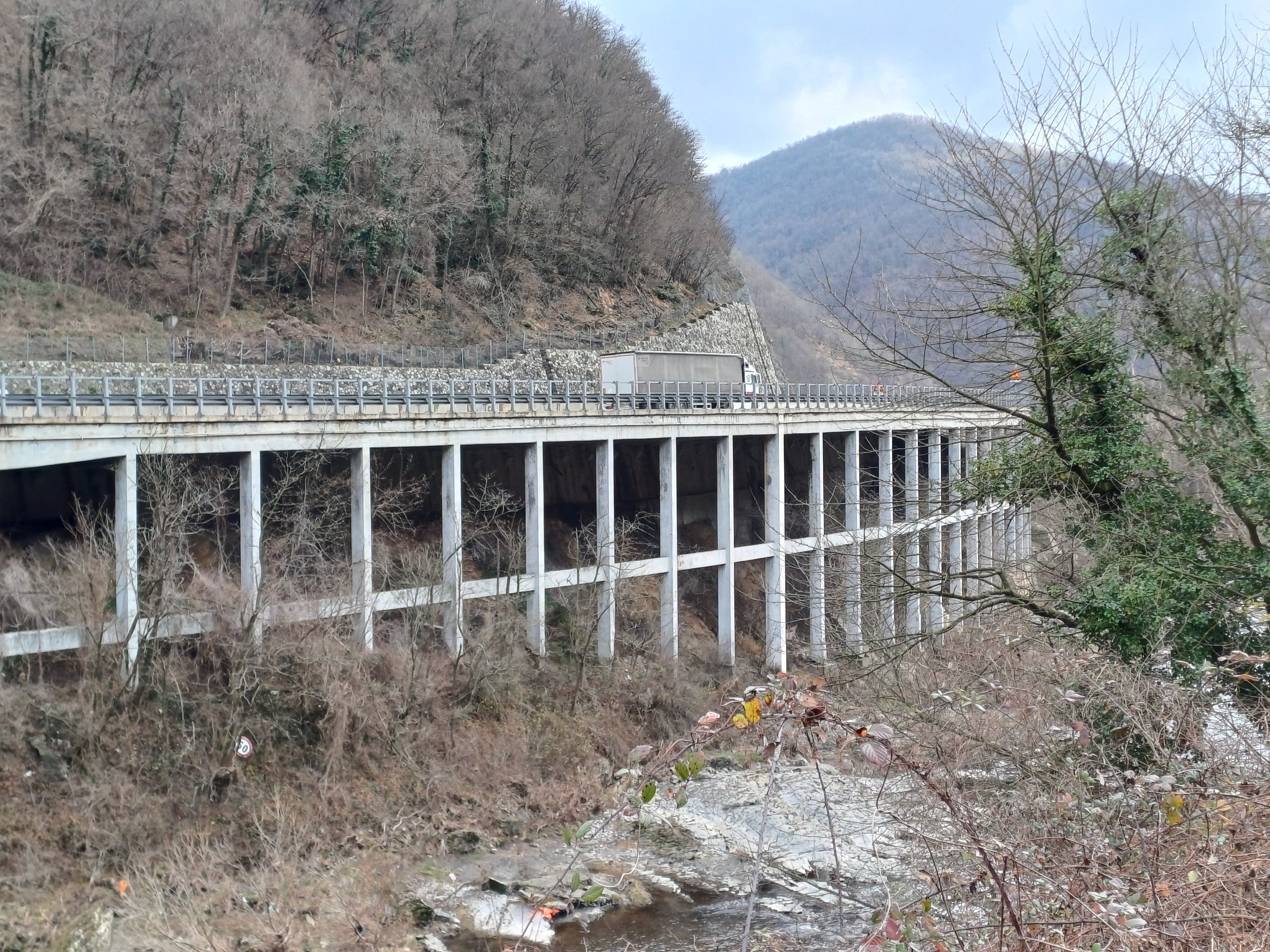
- Creverina in 2023

- Location of Creverina in Italy
- Coordinates: 44°37′N 8°57′E
- Country: Italy
- Region: Liguria
- Province: Genoa (GE)
- Comune: Isola del Cantone
- Elevation: 312 m (1,024 ft)

Population (31 December 2011)
  - Total: 30
- Demonym: Creverini
- Time zone: UTC+1 (CET)
  - Summer (DST): UTC+2 (CEST)
- Postal code: 16017
- Dialing code: 010

Creverina is a frazione of Isola del Cantone in Italy in the province of Genoa in the Liguria region.

According to the 2011 assessment. In the settlement lived 30 inhabitants. The settlement is at Altitude of 312 m.
