= Cabella Ligure =

- Comune
- Comune di Cabella Ligure
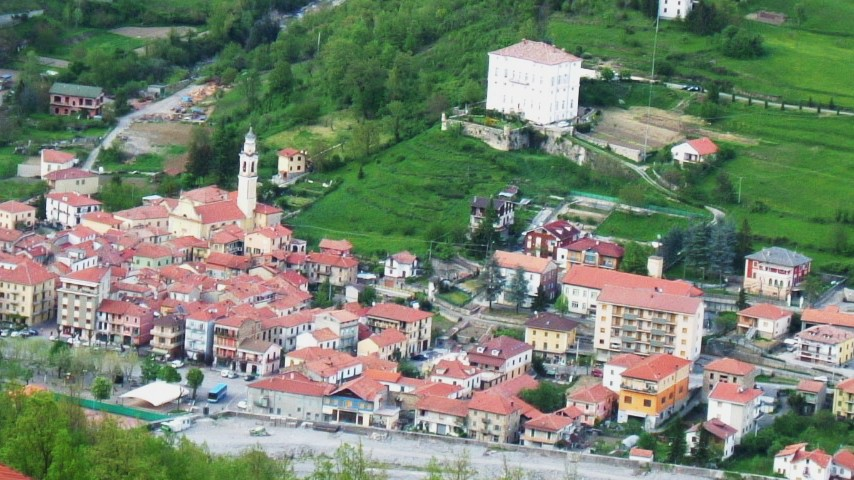

- Location within Italy Location within Piedmont
- Coordinates: 44°40′N 9°5′E
- Country: Italy
- Region: Piedmont
- Province: Alessandria (AL)
- Frazioni: Centrassi, Casella, Cornareto, Pobbio Inf. e Pobbio Sup., Selvagnassi, Teo, Piuzzo, Cornareto, Rosano, Dovanelli, Cremonte, Piancerreto, Serasso, Dova Inferiore, Dova Superiore, Cosola, Capanne di Cosola, Guazzolo

Government
  - Mayor: Roberta Daglio

Area
  - Total: 46.8 km^{2} (18.1 sq mi)
- Elevation: 510 m (1,670 ft)

Population (30 April 2017)
  - Total: 526
  - Density: 11.2/km^{2} (29.1/sq mi)
- Demonym: Cabellesi
- Time zone: UTC+1 (CET)
  - Summer (DST): UTC+2 (CEST)
- Postal code: 15060
- Dialing code: 0143
- Website: Official website

Cabella Ligure is a comune (municipality) in the Province of Alessandria in the Italian region Piedmont, located about 120 kilometres (75 mi) southeast of Turin and about 45 kilometres (28 mi) southeast of Alessandria.

Cabella Ligure borders the following municipalities: Albera Ligure, Carrega Ligure, Fabbrica Curone, Mongiardino Ligure, Ottone, Rocchetta Ligure, and Zerba.

== Transport ==
Located deep in the Valley of Borbera, the town can be readily accessed by either private transport or by public bus, the latter operated by Autolinee Val Borbera. Their services operate to the nearest rail link at Arquata Scrivia and to the large mall complex at Serravalle.

The road SP140 is the main road that connects Cabella to the nearby municipalities and to Arquata. It is a popular route by cyclers who look to cross the Apennine section of Piedmonte/Liguria.

== Economy ==
Cabella is a seasonal location for tourism. Across June-September, the inhabitants of the town may well increase three to fourfold. These tourists come from around the world to pay visit to Shri Mataji's Castle, and to visit other locations administered by the Shri Mataji Foundation. The agriculture sector in the vicinity of Cabella has dwindled over the past decades.
