= Roccaforte Ligure =

- Comune
- Comune di Roccaforte Ligure
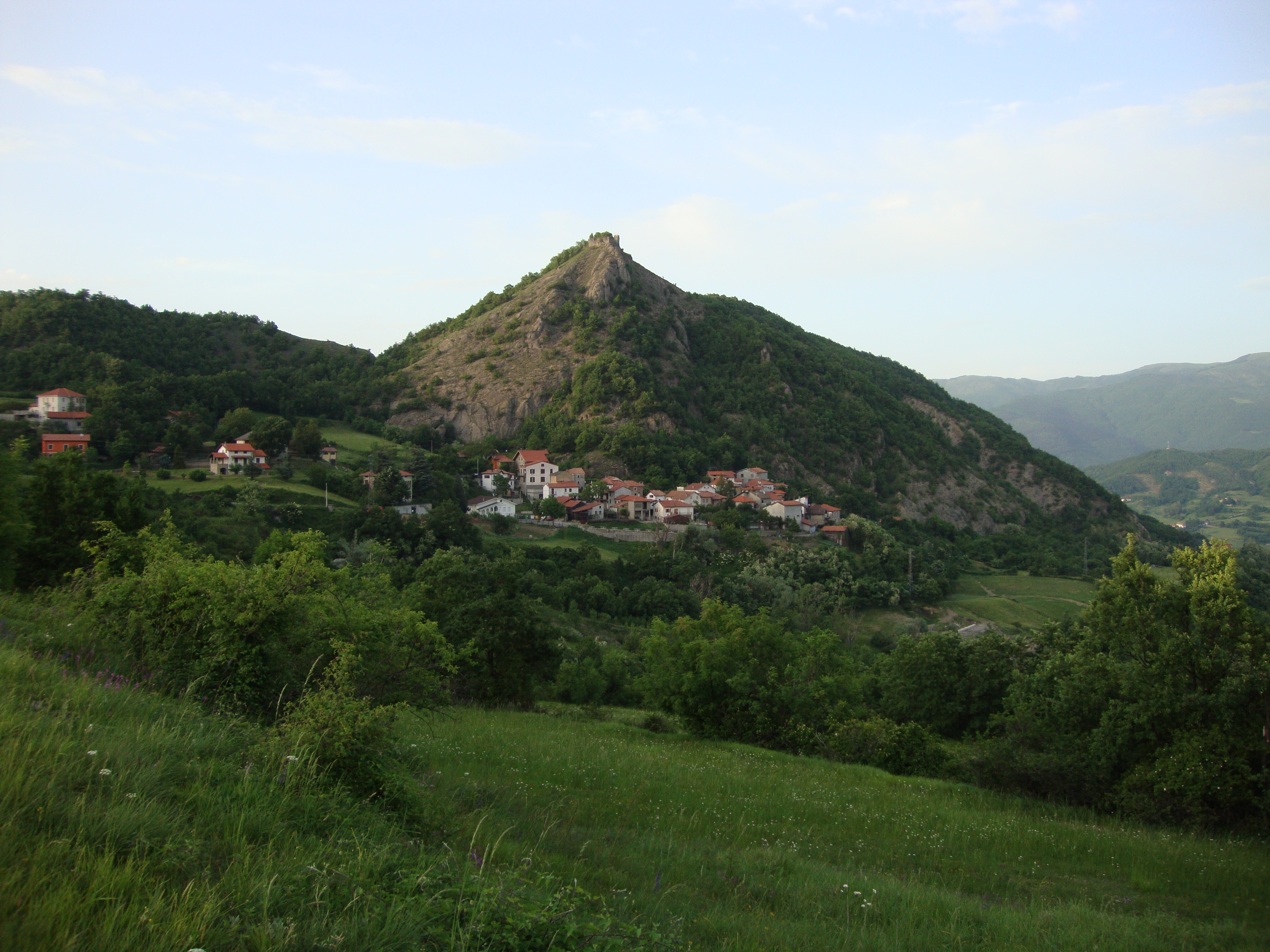

- Coat of arms

- Location within Italy Location within Piedmont
- Coordinates: 44°41′N 9°2′E
- Country: Italy
- Region: Piedmont
- Province: Alessandria (AL)
- Frazioni: Avi, Barca, Borassi, Camere Vecchie, Campo dei Re, Chiappella, Chiesa di Rocca, Corti, Ricò, Riva, San Martino, Villa

Government
  - Mayor: Giorgio Torre

Area
  - Total: 20.6 km^{2} (8.0 sq mi)
- Elevation: 704 m (2,310 ft)

Population (30 November 2017)
  - Total: 125
  - Density: 6.07/km^{2} (15.7/sq mi)
- Demonym: Roccafortini
- Time zone: UTC+1 (CET)
  - Summer (DST): UTC+2 (CEST)
- Postal code: 15060
- Dialing code: 0143

Roccaforte Ligure is a comune (municipality) in the Province of Alessandria in the Italian region Piedmont, located about 110 kilometres (68 mi) southeast of Turin and about 40 kilometres (25 mi) southeast of Alessandria, between the Val Sisola and the Valle Spinti.

Roccaforte Ligure borders the following municipalities: Borghetto di Borbera, Cantalupo Ligure, Grondona, Isola del Cantone, Mongiardino Ligure, and Rocchetta Ligure.
