= Rocchetta Ligure =

- Comune
- Comune di Rocchetta Ligure
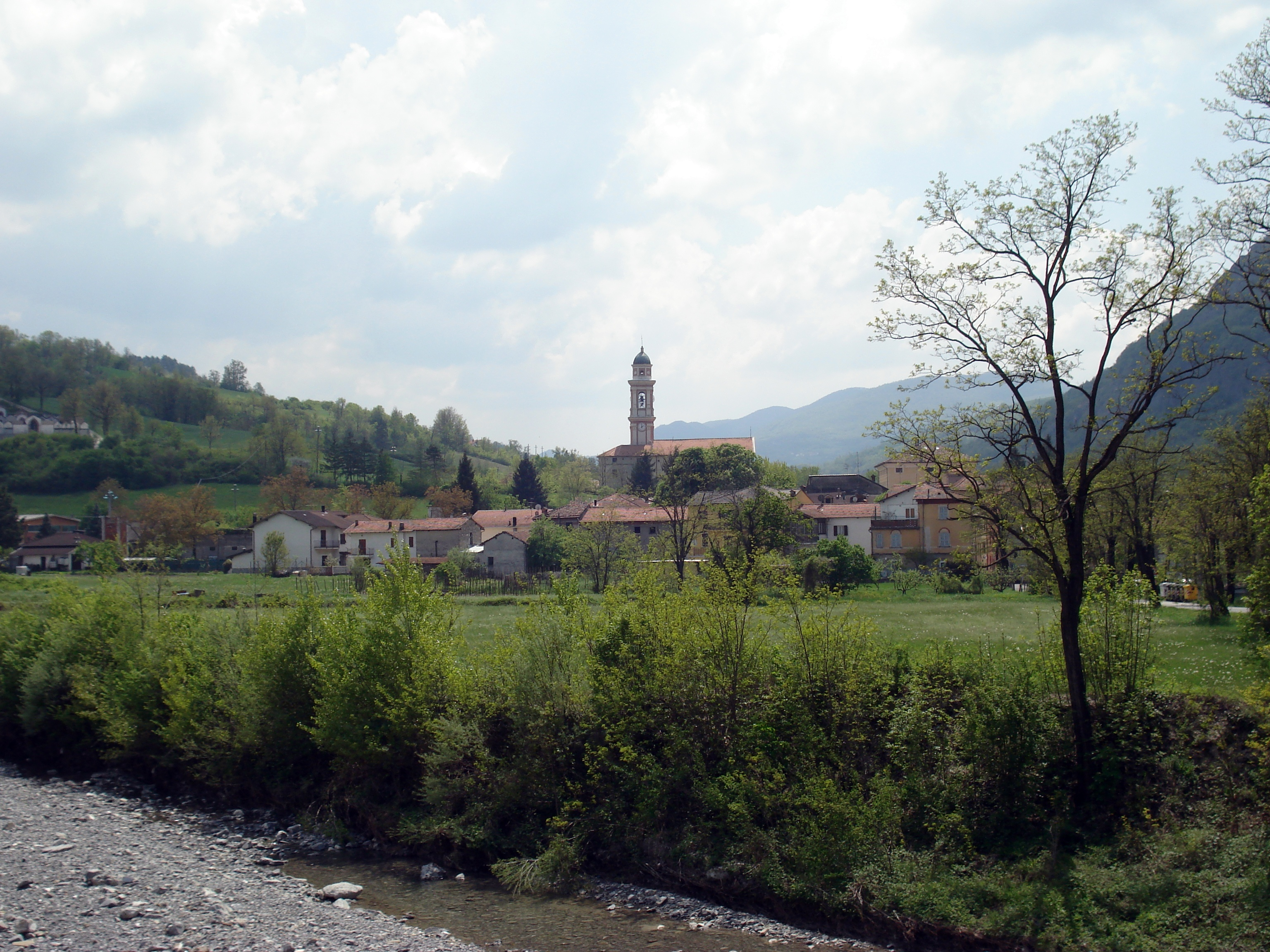

- Location within Italy Location within Piedmont
- Coordinates: 44°42′N 9°3′E
- Country: Italy
- Region: Piedmont
- Province: Province of Alessandria (AL)
- Frazioni: Bregni Inferiore, Bregni Superiore, Celio, Pagliaro Inferiore, Pagliaro Superiore, Piani di Celio, Sant'Ambrogio, Sisola

Area
  - Total: 10.1 km^{2} (3.9 sq mi)
- Elevation: 420 m (1,380 ft)

Population (Dec. 2004)
  - Total: 208
  - Density: 20.6/km^{2} (53.3/sq mi)
- Demonym: Rocchettini
- Time zone: UTC+1 (CET)
  - Summer (DST): UTC+2 (CEST)
- Postal code: 15060
- Dialing code: 0143

Rocchetta Ligure is a comune (municipality) in the Province of Alessandria in the Italian region Piedmont, located about 110 kilometres (68 mi) southeast of Turin and about 40 kilometres (25 mi) southeast of Alessandria. As of 31 December 2004, it had a population of 208 and an area of 10.1 square kilometres (3.9 mi^{2}).

The municipality of Rocchetta Ligure contains the frazioni (subdivisions, mainly villages and hamlets) Bregni Inferiore, Bregni Superiore, Celio, Pagliaro Inferiore, Pagliaro Superiore, Piani di Celio, Sant'Ambrogio, and Sisola.

Rocchetta Ligure borders the following municipalities: Albera Ligure, Cabella Ligure, Cantalupo Ligure, Mongiardino Ligure, and Roccaforte Ligure.

== Demographic evolution ==
Historical population

Year	Pop.	±%
1861	895	—
1871	935	+4.5%
1881	926	−1.0%
1901	668	−27.9%
1911	653	−2.2%

Year	Pop.	±%
1921	610	−6.6%
1931	623	+2.1%
1936	664	+6.6%
1951	552	−16.9%
1961	432	−21.7%

Year	Pop.	±%
1971	382	−11.6%
1981	313	−18.1%
1991	263	−16.0%
2001	220	−16.3%

Source: Data from ISTAT
