= Chiappa =

Chiappa is an Italian surname. Notable people with the surname include:

- Imelda Chiappa, Italian cyclist
- Noel Chiappa, computer scientist and Internet pioneer
- Roberto Chiappa, Italian cyclist

== See also ==
- Chiappa Firearms, Italian firearms manufacturing company
