= Arquata Scrivia =

Arquata Scrivia Auquâ
- Comune
- Comune di Arquata Scrivia
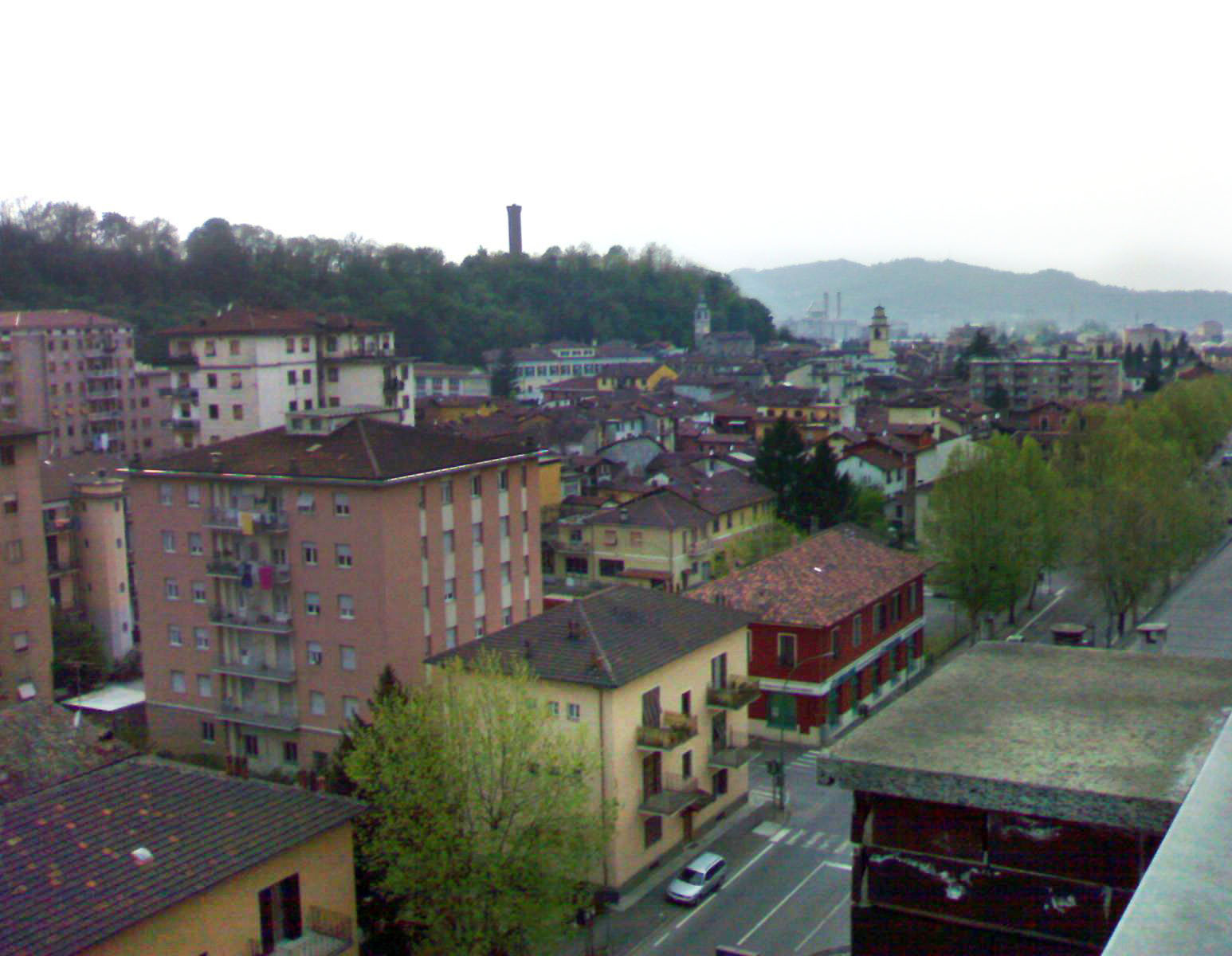

- Coat of arms

- Location of Arquata Scrivia in Italy Arquata Scrivia (Piedmont)
- Coordinates: 44°41′N 8°53′E
- Country: Italy
- Region: Piedmont
- Province: Alessandria (AL)
- Frazioni: Rigoroso, Sottovalle, Varinella, Vocemola

Government
  - Mayor: Alberto Basso

Area
  - Total: 23.4 km^{2} (9.0 sq mi)
- Elevation: 248 m (814 ft)

Population (30 September 2014)
  - Total: 6,323
  - Density: 270/km^{2} (700/sq mi)
- Demonym: Arquatesi
- Time zone: UTC+1 (CET)
  - Summer (DST): UTC+2 (CEST)
- Postal code: 15061
- Dialing code: 0143
- Website: Official website

Arquata Scrivia (local dialect: Auquâ) is a comune (municipality) in the Province of Alessandria in the Italian region Piedmont, located about 100 kilometres (62 mi) southeast of Turin and about 35 kilometres (22 mi) southeast of Alessandria.

Arquata Scrivia borders the following municipalities: Gavi, Grondona, Isola del Cantone, Serravalle Scrivia, and Vignole Borbera.

== History ==
It is located on the left bank of the Scrivia river. The name derives from the Latin arcuata (arched), due to the presence of an aqueduct supplying the nearby Roman town of Libarna, on the Via Postumia.

It is mentioned as a castrum (fortress) in the 11th century, and later was contended between the Republic of Genoa and the commune of Tortona: after they signed a peace agreement in 1227, they dismantled the castle. In 1313, it was given by emperor Henry VII to the Genoese Spinola family, who were named marquisses of the town in 1641. Three years later Arquata also obtained the right to strike coins of its own.

It was sacked by French troops in 1796. The following year it was annexed to the Ligurian Republic. After the fall of Napoleon Bonaparte, it became part of the Kingdom of Sardinia-Piedmont. During the First World War, British soldiers were stationed in Arquata to support Italian soldiers. A team of Red Cross nurses headed by Mrs. Marie Watkins used the theatre at Arquata Scrivia as a recreation room and canteen for British soldiers. The Communal Cemetery Extension of Arquata is the British war cemetery where British soldiers are buried who died in the war or of the Spanish flu.

== Notable people ==
- Admiral Giuseppe Cavo Dragone, former Chief of the Italian Defense Staff and current Chair of the NATO Military Committee
