= Borghetto di Borbera =

- Comune
- Comune di Borghetto di Borbera
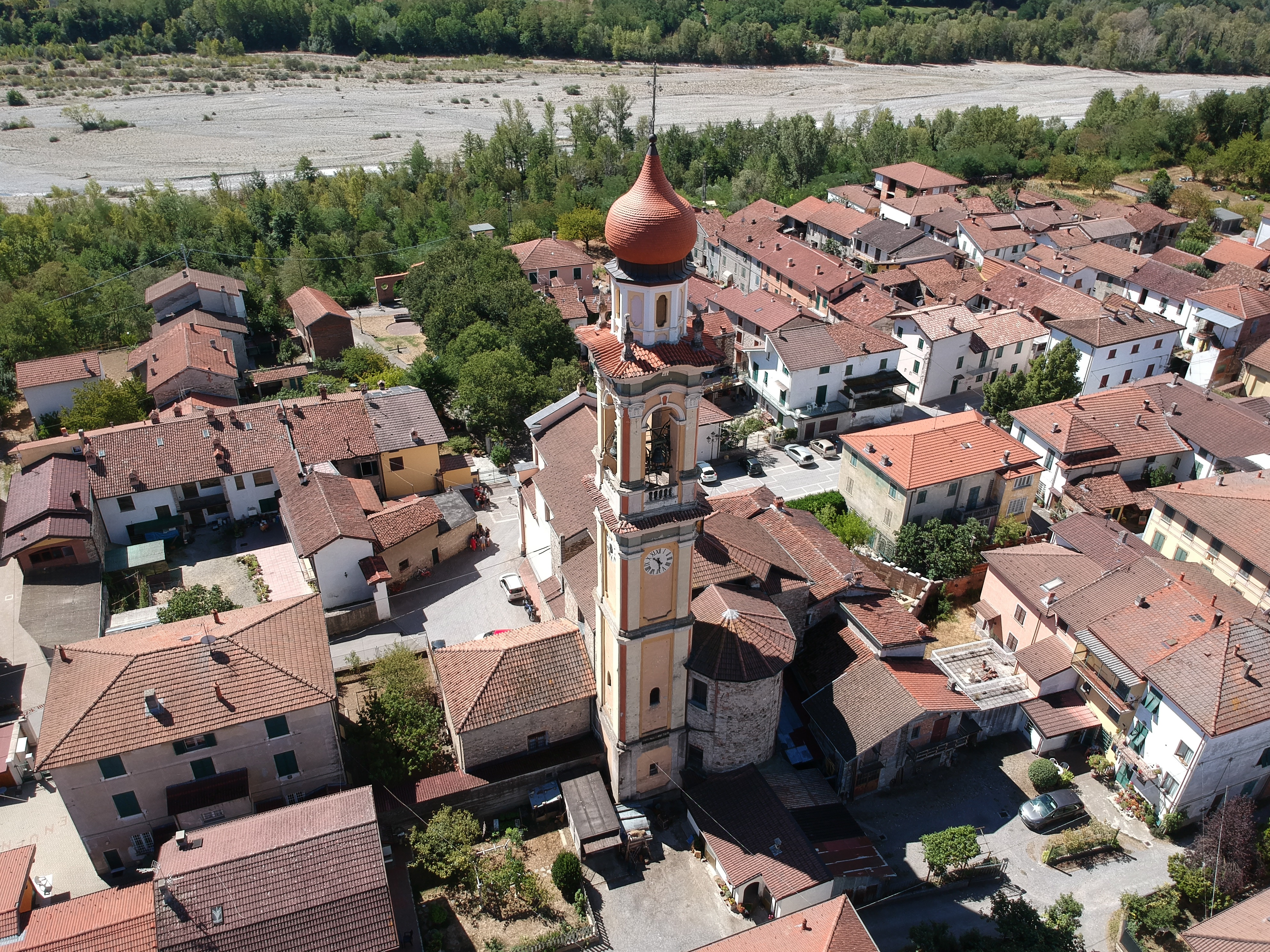
- Scenic view of the old town.

- Coat of arms

- Location within Italy Location within Piedmont
- Coordinates: 44°44′N 8°57′E
- Country: Italy
- Region: Piedmont
- Province: Alessandria (AL)
- Frazioni: Cerreto Ratti, Castel Ratti, Molo Borbera, Monteggio, Persi, Sorli

Government
  - Mayor: Domenico Franco Angelo Saporito

Area
  - Total: 39.6 km^{2} (15.3 sq mi)
- Elevation: 295 m (968 ft)

Population (31 August 2017)
  - Total: 1,996
  - Density: 50.4/km^{2} (131/sq mi)
- Demonym: Borghettesi
- Time zone: UTC+1 (CET)
  - Summer (DST): UTC+2 (CEST)
- Postal code: 15060
- Dialing code: 0143
- Website: Official website

Borghetto di Borbera is a comune (municipality) in the Province of Alessandria in the Italian region Piedmont, located about 110 kilometres (68 mi) southeast of Turin and about 35 kilometres (22 mi) southeast of Alessandria.

Borghetto di Borbera borders the following municipalities: Cantalupo Ligure, Dernice, Garbagna, Grondona, Roccaforte Ligure, Sardigliano, Stazzano, and Vignole Borbera.

== Main sights ==
In the town are the remainders of an old medieval castle, including a tower and a gate. The castle collapsed long time ago into the close by river bed due to water erosion and landslides. In the nearby village Torre Ratti is a well preserved castle from the 11th Century, which was enlarged and restored several times in the following centuries.

The new townhall was built in early 20th century as one of the first reinforced concrete buildings in Italy.

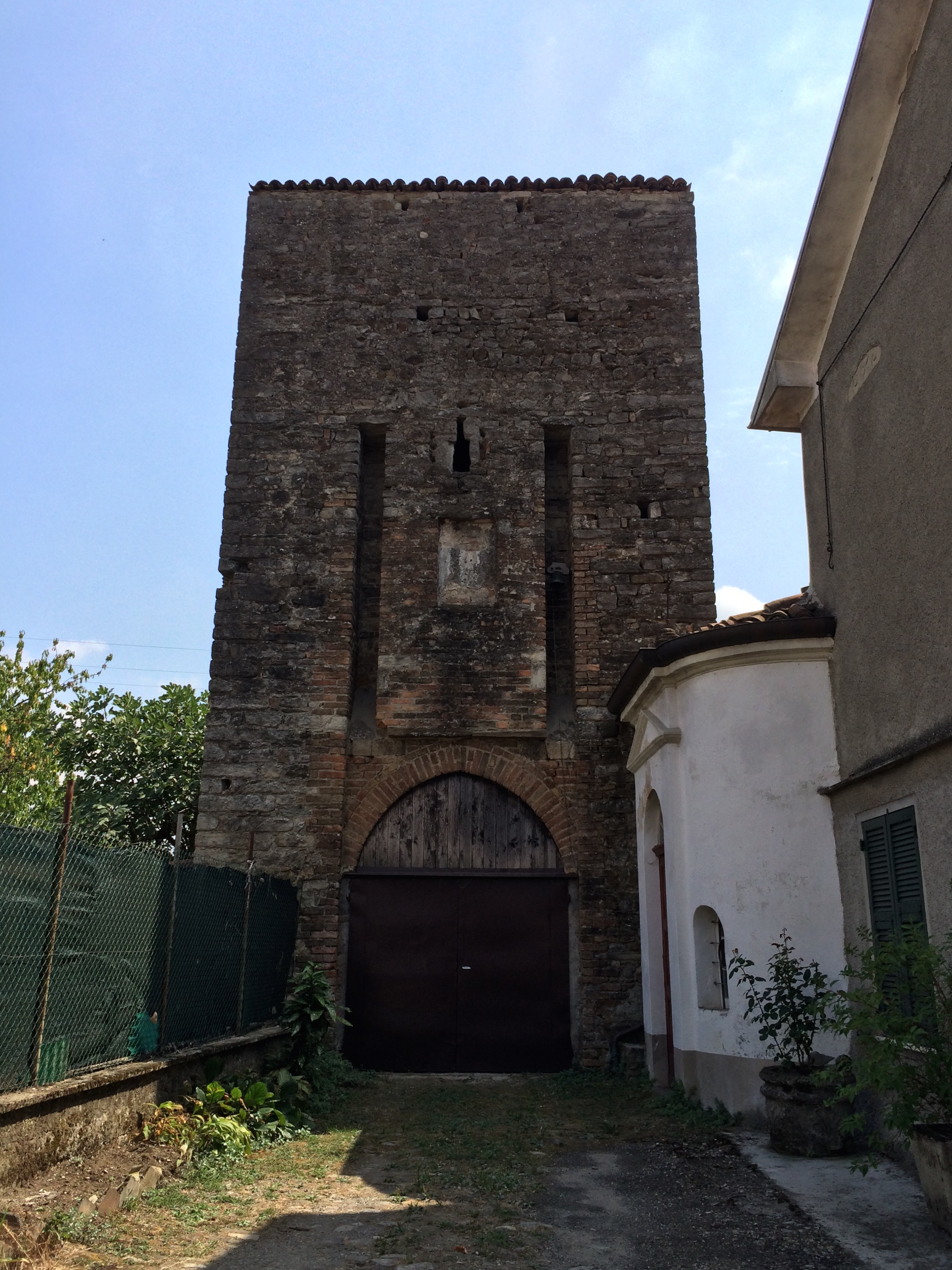
The medieval gate

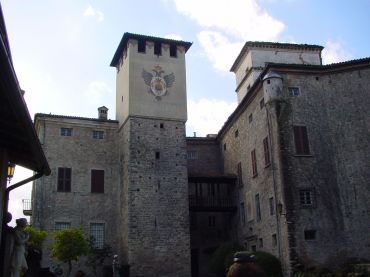
The castle at Torre Ratti

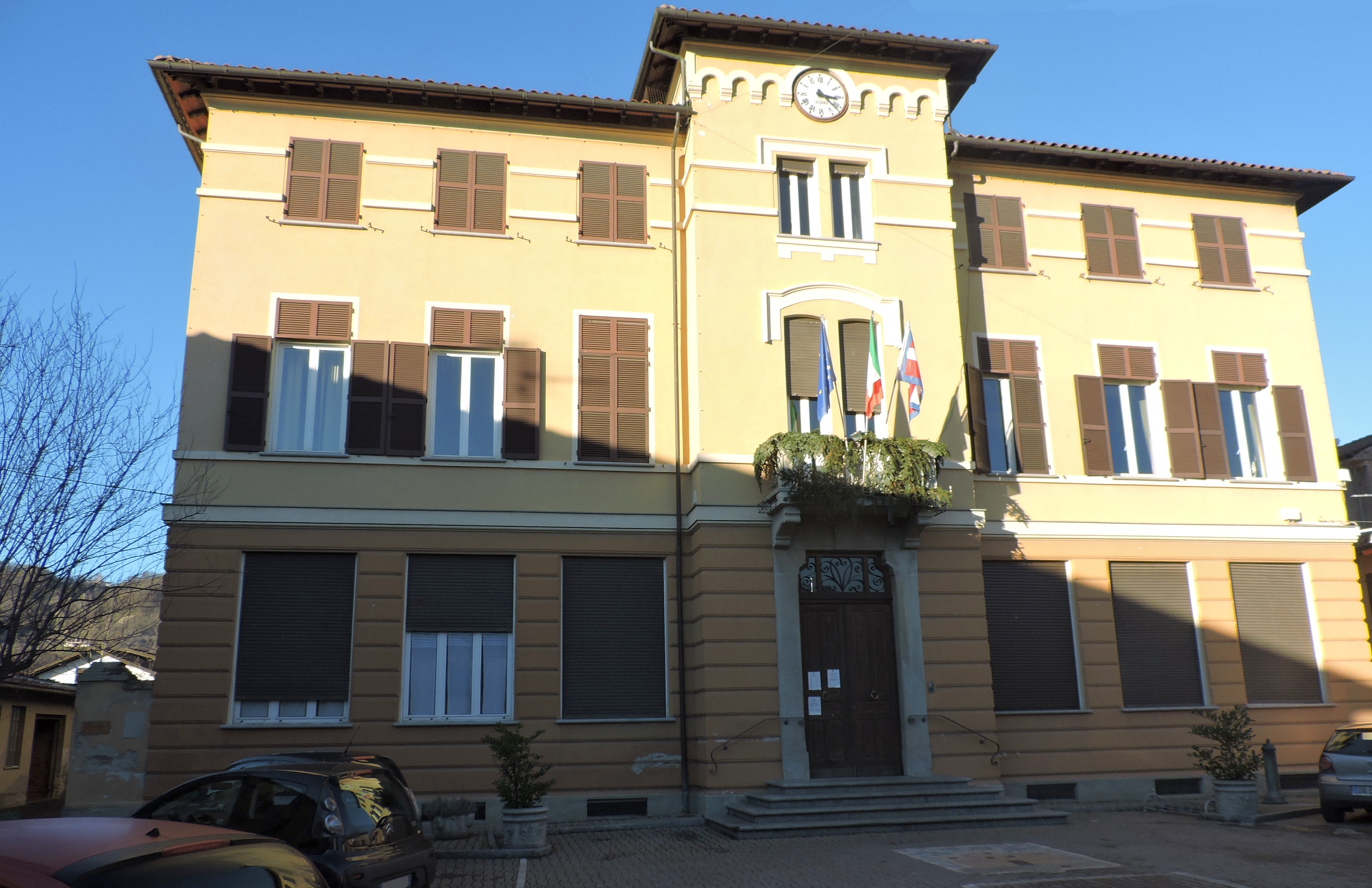
The new townhall

== Twin towns — sister cities ==
Borghetto di Borbera is twinned with:

- Loreggia, Italy, since 2001
