= Cantalupo Ligure =

- Comune
- Comune di Cantalupo Ligure
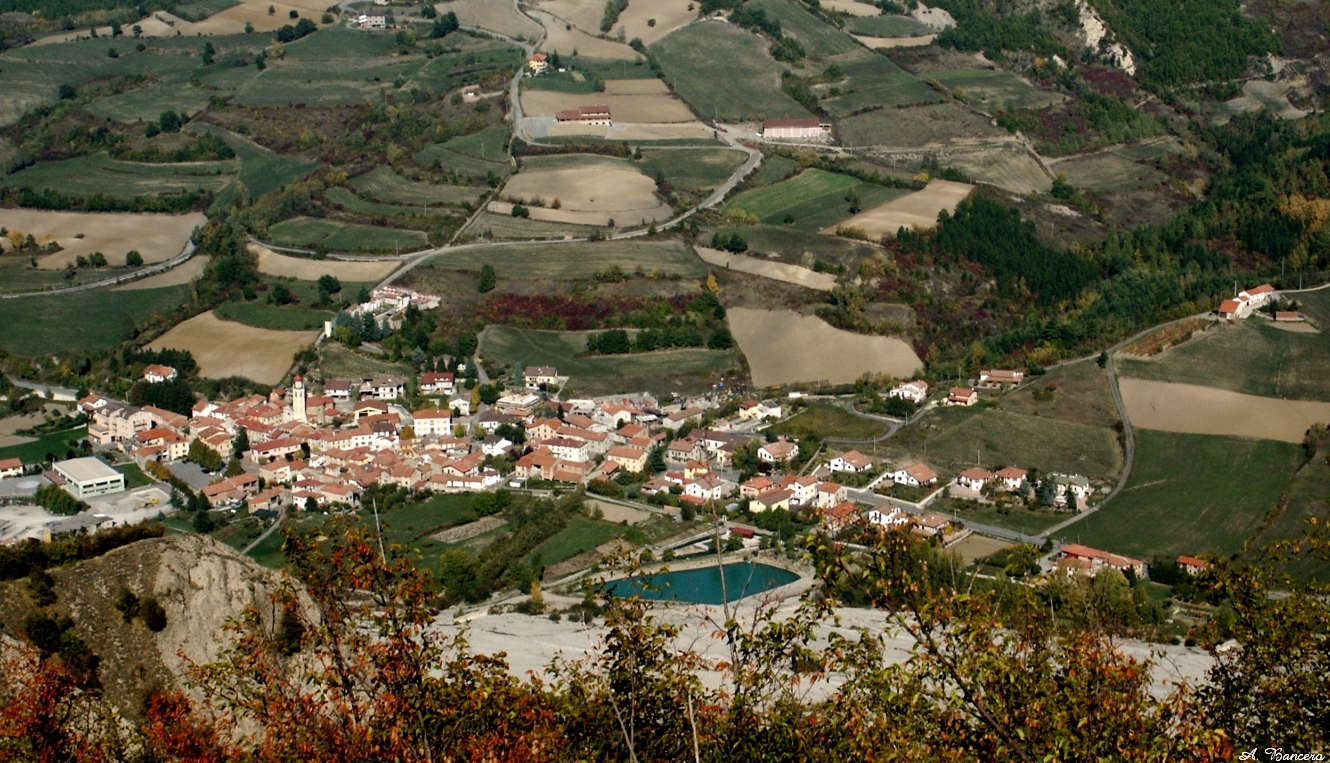

- Location within Italy Location within Piedmont
- Coordinates: 44°43′N 9°3′E
- Country: Italy
- Region: Piedmont
- Province: Province of Alessandria (AL)
- Frazioni: Pallavicino, Borgo Adorno, Pessinate, Semega, Campana, Zebedassi, Besante, Arborelle, Colonne, Pertuso, Prato, Merlassino, Costa Merlassino

Government
  - Mayor: Pierluigi Debenedetti

Area
  - Total: 24.06 km^{2} (9.29 sq mi)
- Elevation: 383 m (1,257 ft)

Population (30 April 2017)
  - Total: 516
  - Density: 21.4/km^{2} (55.5/sq mi)
- Demonym: Cantalupesi
- Time zone: UTC+1 (CET)
  - Summer (DST): UTC+2 (CEST)
- Postal code: 15060
- Dialing code: 0143
- Website: Official website

Cantalupo Ligure is a comune (municipality) in the Province of Alessandria in the Italian region Piedmont, located about 110 kilometres (68 mi) southeast of Turin and about 40 kilometres (25 mi) southeast of Alessandria.

Cantalupo Ligure borders the following municipalities: Albera Ligure, Borghetto di Borbera, Dernice, Montacuto, Roccaforte Ligure, and Rocchetta Ligure.
