= Monte Chiappo =

Mountain in Italy

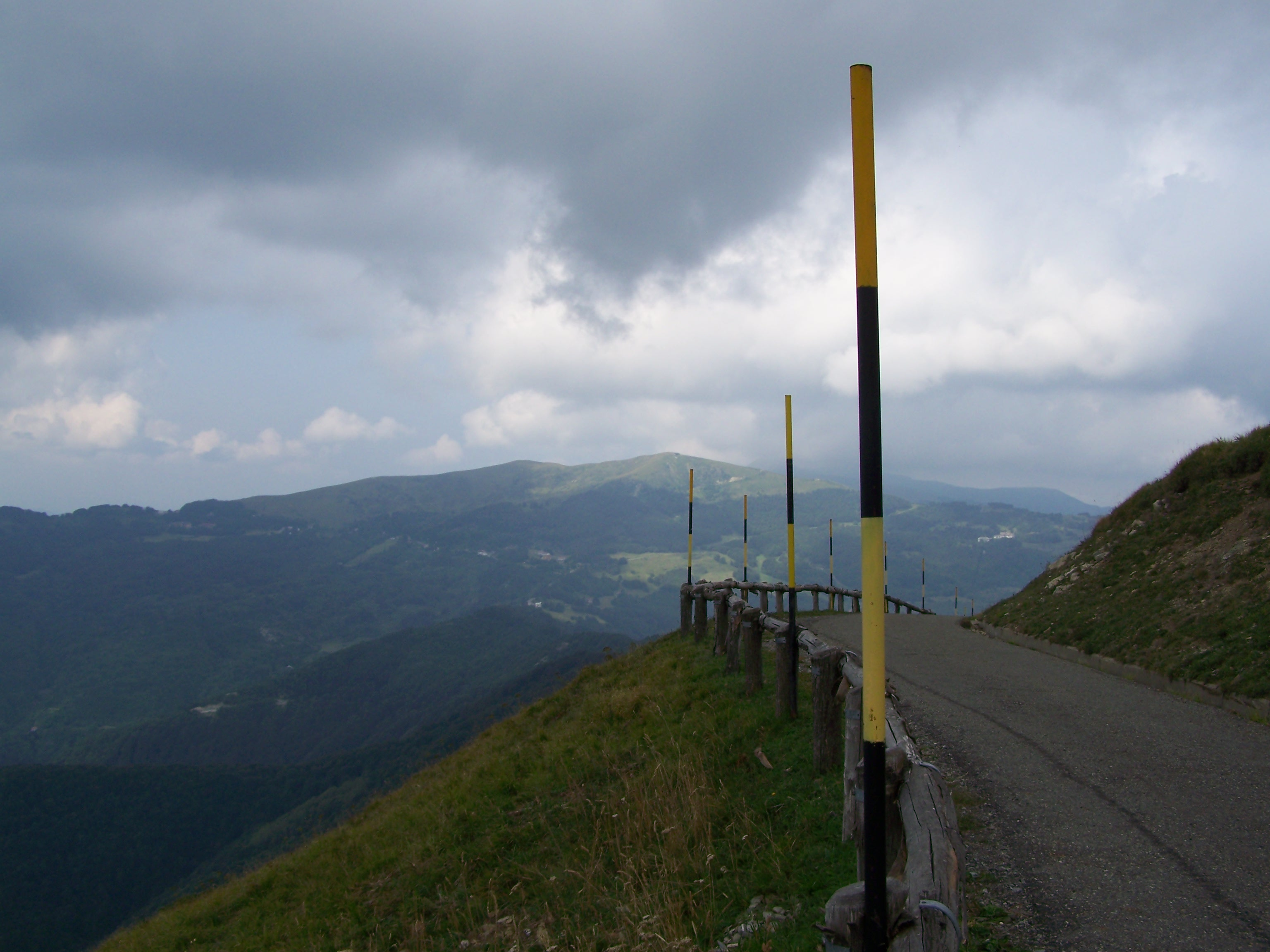

Highest point
- Elevation: 1,700 m (5,600 ft)
- Prominence: 330 m (1,080 ft)
- Isolation: 4.74 km (2.95 mi)
- Coordinates: 44°41′14″N 9°12′06″E

Geography
- Location within Italy
- Location: Lombardy, Piedmont, Emilia-Romagna (Italy)
- Parent range: Ligurian Apennine

Monte Chiappo is one of the Apennine Mountains in Italy.

== Geography ==
The mountain has an elevation of 1,700 metres (5,577 ft).

Its summit is a tripoint at which the borders of the regions of Piedmont, Lombardy and Emilia-Romagna meet.
