= Stazzano =

- Comune
- Comune di Stazzano
- Location within Italy Location within Piedmont
- Coordinates: 44°43′N 8°52′E
- Country: Italy
- Region: Piedmont
- Province: Province of Alessandria (AL)
- Frazioni: Vargo, Albarasca

Area
  - Total: 17.8 km^{2} (6.9 sq mi)
- Elevation: 225 m (738 ft)

Population (Dec. 2004)
  - Total: 2,168
  - Density: 122/km^{2} (315/sq mi)
- Demonym: Stazzanesi
- Time zone: UTC+1 (CET)
  - Summer (DST): UTC+2 (CEST)
- Postal code: 15060
- Dialing code: 0143

Stazzano is a comune (municipality) in the Province of Alessandria in the Italian region Piedmont, located about 100 kilometres (62 mi) southeast of Turin and about 30 kilometres (19 mi) southeast of Alessandria. As of 31 December 2004, it had a population of 2,168 and an area of 17.8 square kilometres (6.9 sq mi).

The municipality of Stazzano contains the frazioni (subdivisions, mainly villages and hamlets) Vargo and Albarasca.

Stazzano borders the following municipalities: Borghetto di Borbera, Cassano Spinola, Sardigliano, Serravalle Scrivia, and Vignole Borbera.

== Demographic evolution ==
Historical population

Year	Pop.	±%
1861	1,499	—
1871	1,460	−2.6%
1881	1,432	−1.9%
1901	1,686	+17.7%
1911	2,021	+19.9%

Year	Pop.	±%
1921	2,173	+7.5%
1931	2,107	−3.0%
1936	2,073	−1.6%
1951	2,010	−3.0%
1961	1,965	−2.2%

Year	Pop.	±%
1971	1,836	−6.6%
1981	1,997	+8.8%
1991	1,987	−0.5%
2001	2,108	+6.1%

Source: Data from ISTAT
