= Albera Ligure =

- Comune
- Comune di Albera Ligure
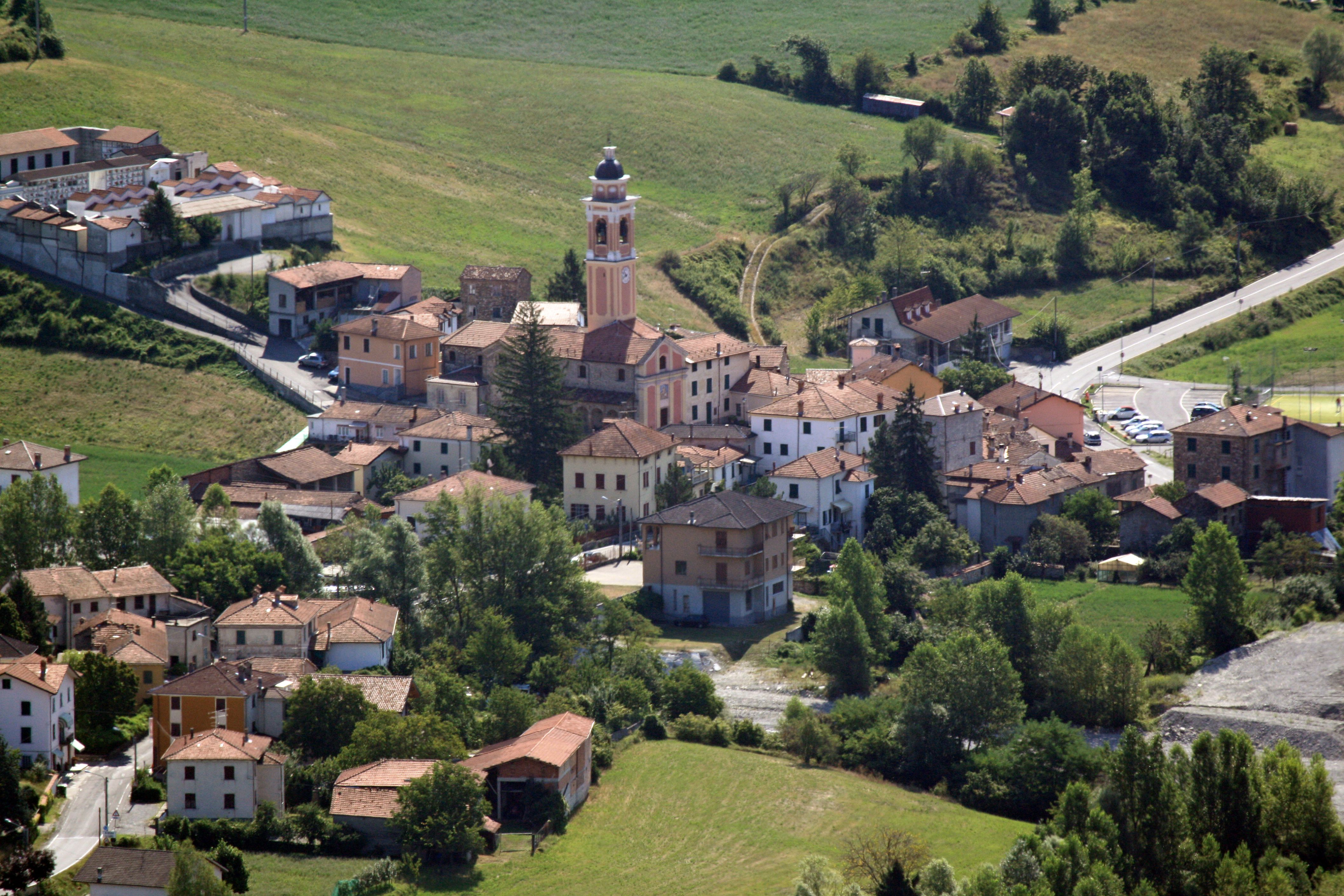

- Coat of arms

- Location of Albera Ligure in Italy Albera Ligure (Piedmont)
- Coordinates: 44°42′N 9°4′E
- Country: Italy
- Region: Piedmont
- Province: Province of Alessandria (AL)
- Frazioni: Astrata, San Martino, Figino, Santa Maria, Vendersi, Vigo, Volpara

Government
  - Mayor: Renato Lovotti

Area
  - Total: 21.4 km^{2} (8.3 sq mi)
- Elevation: 423 m (1,388 ft)

Population (30 November 2017)
  - Total: 308
  - Density: 14.4/km^{2} (37.3/sq mi)
- Demonym: Alberini or Albèresi
- Time zone: UTC+1 (CET)
  - Summer (DST): UTC+2 (CEST)
- Postal code: 15060
- Dialing code: 0143
- Website: Official website

Albera Ligure is a comune (municipality) in the Province of Alessandria in the Italian region Piedmont, located about 120 kilometres (75 mi) southeast of Turin and about 45 kilometres (28 mi) southeast of Alessandria.

Albera Ligure borders the following municipalities: Cabella Ligure, Cantalupo Ligure, Fabbrica Curone, Montacuto, and Rocchetta Ligure.
