= Scrivia =

- The Scrivia near Busalla

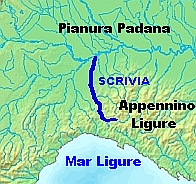

Location
- Country: Italy

Physical characteristics
- Source
  - location: Monte Prelà, Torriglia (Province of Genoa)
  - elevation: 1,300 m (4,300 ft)
- Mouth
  - location: Po, in the commune of Cornale (Province of Pavia)
  - coordinates: 45.0555°N 8.9020°E
- Length: 117.2 km (72.8 mi)
- Basin size: 1,145 km^{2} (442 mi^{2})
- Discharge
  - average: 19.2 m^{3}/s (680 cu ft/s)

Basin features
- Progression: Po→ Adriatic Sea

The Scrivia, 117 kilometres (73 mi) long, is a right tributary of the river Po, in northern Italy. It runs through Liguria, Piedmont, and Lombardy.

== Main tributaries ==
- left hand:
  - torrente Laccio;
  - torrente Busalletta;
  - torrente Traversa;
  - rio San Rocco;
- right hand:
  - torrente Pentemina;
  - torrente Brevenna
  - torrente Seminella;
  - torrente Vobbia;
  - torrente Spinti;
  - torrente Borbera;
  - torrente Ossona,
  - torrente Grue.

== Other projects ==
Media related to Scrivia river at Wikimedia Commons
