= Vignole Borbera =

- Comune
- Comune di Vignole Borbera
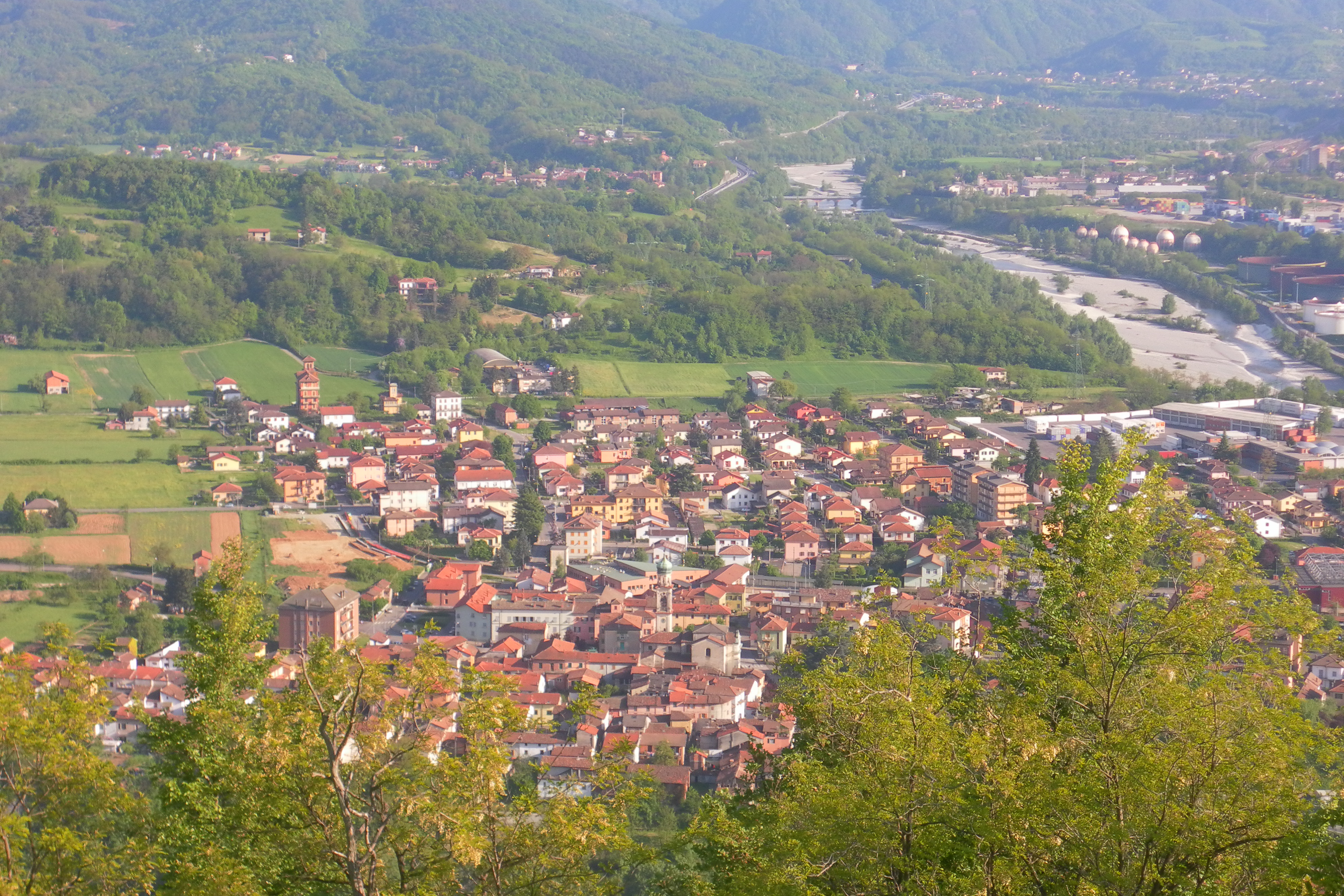

- Location within Italy Location within Piedmont
- Coordinates: 44°42′N 8°53′E
- Country: Italy
- Region: Piedmont
- Province: Alessandria (AL)
- Frazioni: Variano Inferiore, Variano Superiore, Precipiano

Government
  - Mayor: Giuseppe Teti

Area
  - Total: 8.5 km^{2} (3.3 sq mi)
- Elevation: 243 m (797 ft)

Population (31 December 2010)
  - Total: 2,279
  - Density: 270/km^{2} (690/sq mi)
- Demonym: Vignolesi
- Time zone: UTC+1 (CET)
  - Summer (DST): UTC+2 (CEST)
- Postal code: 15060
- Dialing code: 0143
- Website: Official website

Vignole Borbera (Ligurian: Ei Vgnêue; Genoese: Vigneue) is a comune (municipality) in the Province of Alessandria in the Italian region of Piedmont, located about 100 kilometres (62 mi) southeast of Turin and about 30 kilometres (19 mi) southeast of Alessandria. As of 31 December 2004, it had a population of 2,154 and an area of 8.5 square kilometres (3.3 mi^{2}).

The municipality of Vignole Borbera contains the frazioni (subdivisions, mainly villages and hamlets) Variano Inferiore, Variano Superiore and Precipiano.

Vignole Borbera borders the following municipalities: Arquata Scrivia, Borghetto di Borbera, Grondona, Serravalle Scrivia, and Stazzano.
