= Serravalle Scrivia =

- Comune
- Comune di Serravalle Scrivia
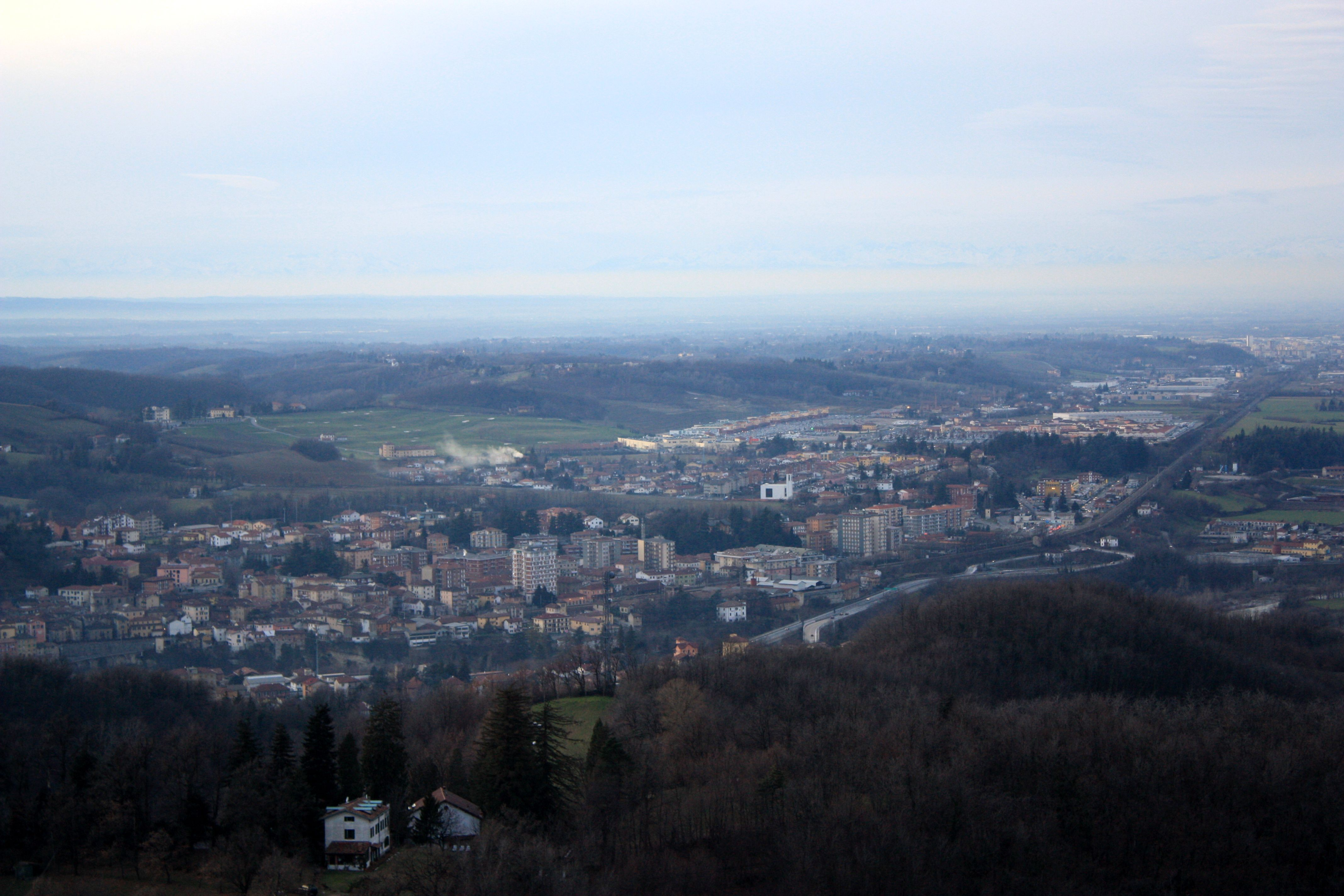

- Coat of arms

- Location within Italy Location within Piedmont
- Coordinates: 44°44′N 8°51′E
- Country: Italy
- Region: Piedmont
- Province: Alessandria (AL)
- Frazioni: Ca' del Sole, Crenna Inferiore, Crenna Superiore, Lastrico, Libarna, Zerbe

Government
  - Mayor: Alberto Carbone

Area
  - Total: 16.0 km^{2} (6.2 sq mi)
- Elevation: 225 m (738 ft)

Population (31 August 2007)
  - Total: 6,209
  - Density: 388/km^{2} (1,010/sq mi)
- Demonym: Serravallesi
- Time zone: UTC+1 (CET)
  - Summer (DST): UTC+2 (CEST)
- Postal code: 15069
- Dialing code: 0143
- Patron saint: St. Martin of Tours
- Saint day: 11 November
- Website: Official website

Serravalle Scrivia is a comune (municipality) in the Province of Alessandria in the Italian region of Piedmont, located about 100 kilometres (62 mi) southeast of Turin and about 25 kilometres (16 mi) southeast of Alessandria.

Serravalle Scrivia borders the following municipalities: Arquata Scrivia, Cassano Spinola, Gavi, Novi Ligure, Stazzano, and Vignole Borbera.

== History ==
The settlement was probably founded by the inhabitants of the Roman city of Libarna after the destruction of that city in 452 AD.

From 1122 Serravalle Scrivia belonged to the bishops of Tortona, until they ceded it to the commune of Tortona, in exchange for the defence of their lands. Later it was an imperial fief, belonging to the Spinola (1313), the Visconti (1381), the Adorno (1391), and the Spinola again from 1482. In 1580 it became part of the Spanish-held Duchy of Milan; after the War of the Spanish Succession, in 1713, it became part of the Austrian Empire.

In 1738, together with the Tortona area, the settlement was acquired by the Kingdom of Sardinia-Piedmont. In 1745, in the course of the War of the Austrian Succession, it was briefly occupied by Franco-Spanish troops. In 1798, after the Napoleonic invasion of Piedmont, it was annexed to the Ligurian Republic; the French, who had conquered Serravalle after the Battle of Marengo, had its castle destroyed. In 1815 the Congress of Vienna restored the town to the House of Savoy.

In 1935 the Autostrada A7 (Genoa-Serravalle) was inaugurated, this became the fastest connection from Turin and Milan to the sea.

In geology, the Serravallian Age of the Miocene Epoch is named for Serravalle Scrivia.
