= Mongiardino Ligure =

- Comune
- Comune di Mongiardino Ligure
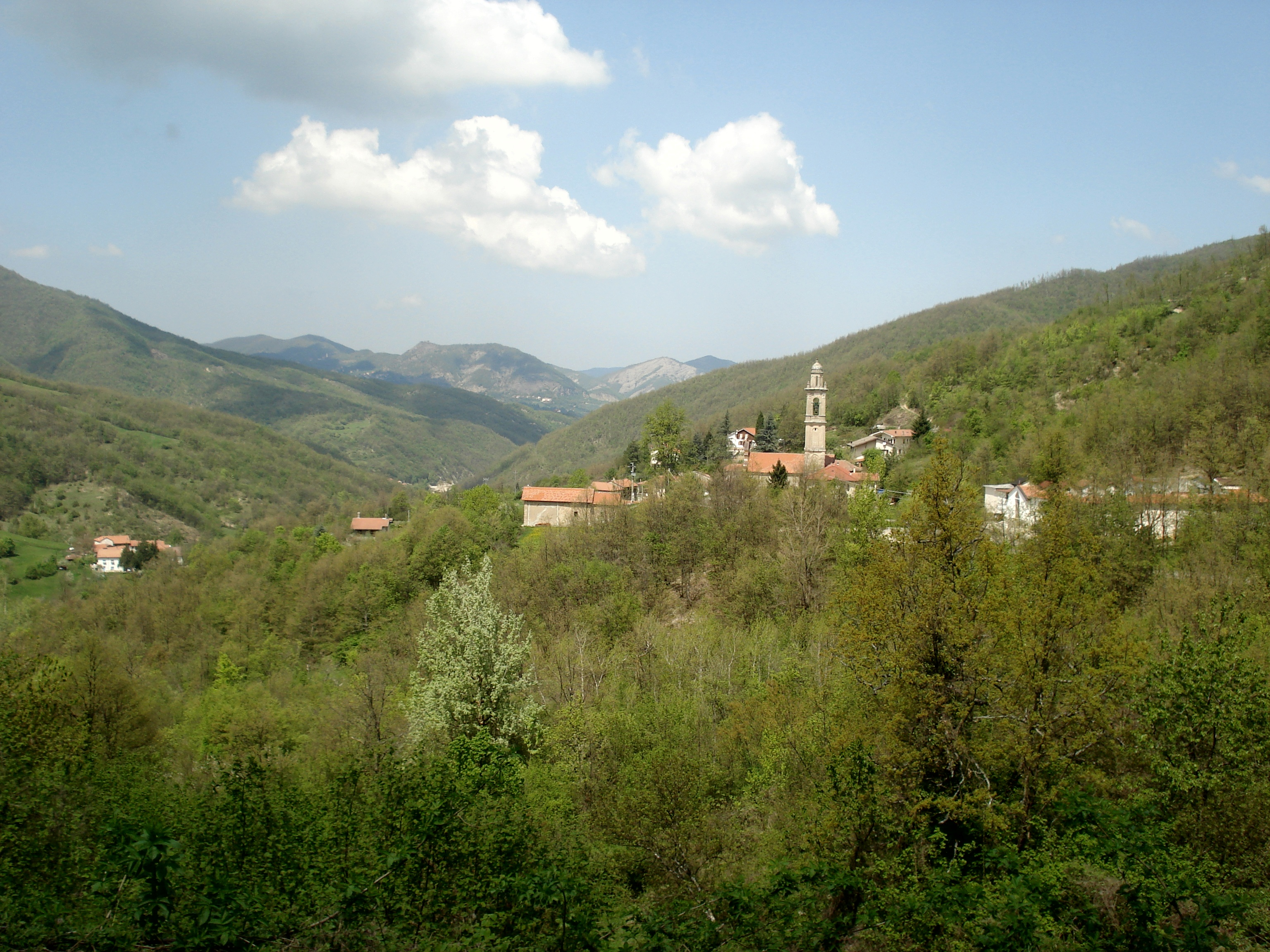
- View of Maggiolo in the comune of Mongiardino Ligure.

- Coat of arms

- Location within Italy Location within Piedmont
- Coordinates: 44°38′N 9°4′E
- Country: Italy
- Region: Piedmont
- Province: Alessandria (AL)
- Frazioni: Borneto, Camere Nuove, Canarie, Casa di Ragione, Casalbusone, Castellaro, Cavanna, Cerendero, Correio, Fubbiano, Ghiare, Gordena, Gorreto, Lago Cerreto, Lago Patrono (communal seat), Maggiolo, Mandirola, Montemanno, Mulino Cascè, Peio, Piansuolo, Prato, Rovello Inferiore, Rovello Superiore, Salata Mongiardino, Vergagni

Government
  - Mayor: Alessia Morando

Area
  - Total: 29.14 km^{2} (11.25 sq mi)
- Elevation: 600 m (2,000 ft)

Population (31 December 2019)
  - Total: 149
  - Density: 5.11/km^{2} (13.2/sq mi)
- Demonym: Mongiardinesi
- Time zone: UTC+1 (CET)
  - Summer (DST): UTC+2 (CEST)
- Postal code: 15060
- Dialing code: 0143
- Patron saint: St. John the Baptist
- Saint day: 24 June
- Website: Official website

Mongiardino Ligure is a comune (municipality) in the Province of Alessandria in the Italian region Piedmont, located about 120 kilometres (75 mi) southeast of Turin and about 50 kilometres (31 mi) southeast of Alessandria.
