= Scoglio Torre della Scuola Lighthouse =

Scoglio Torre della Scuola
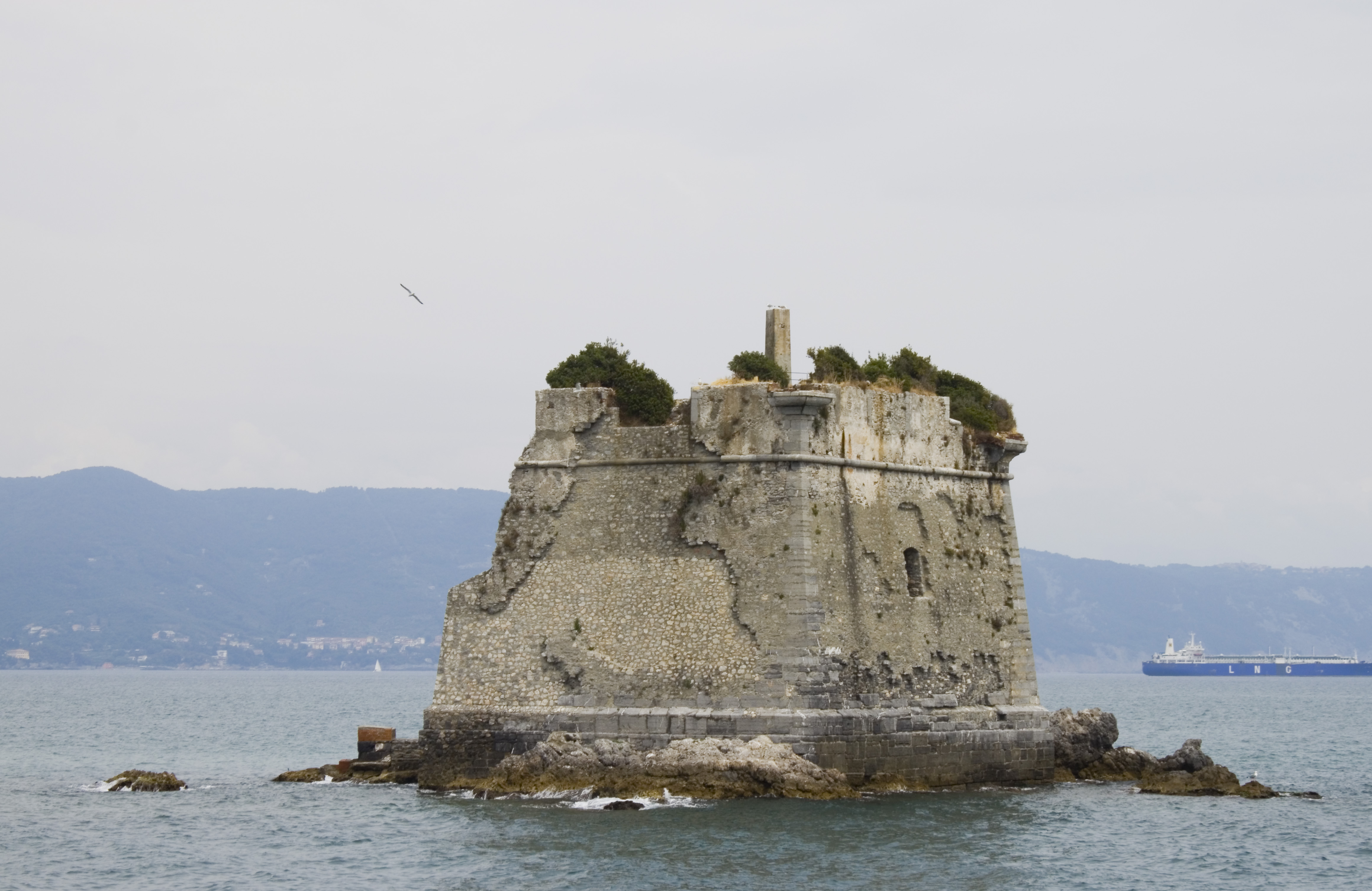
- Scoglio Torre della Scuola Lighthouse
- Location: Isola della Palmaria; Portovenere; Liguria; Italy
- Coordinates: 44°03′06″N 9°51′31″E

Tower
- Constructed: 1920s or 1930s
- Construction: metal mast
- Height: 2 metres (6.6 ft)
- Shape: cylindrical mast
- Markings: white mast with light
- Power source: solar power
- Operator: Marina Militare

Light
- Focal height: 16 metres (52 ft)
- Lens: type TD
- Intensity: LABI 100 W
- Range: 10 nautical miles (19 km; 12 mi)
- Characteristic: Fl (2) W 6s.
- Italy no.: 1716 E.F.

Scoglio Torre della Scuola Lighthouse (Italian: Torre della Scuola) is an active lighthouse located 243 metres (797 ft) from the north-eastern tip of Palmaria in the Gulf of La Spezia.

== Description ==
The lighthouse is placed on a metal mast 2 metres (6.6 ft) high atop the Scola Tower and has a focal height of 16 metres (52 ft). It is fully automated and operated by the Lighthouses Service of the Marina Militare identified by the code number 1716 E.F. The lighthouse is powered by a solar unit and the lantern emits two white flashes in a six seconds period visible up to 10 nautical miles (19 km; 12 mi).

== See also ==
- List of lighthouses in Italy
