= Varignano =

Varignano is a frazione of the town of Porto Venere in the province of La Spezia, located on the western part of the Gulf of La Spezia.

== Territory ==
The territory of Varignano is circumscribed to a short piece of the coast of the gulf that is made of a bay that overlooks La Spezia's gulf. The bay is delimited from two promontories: on the first one there's the Comando Subacquei ed Incursori, on the second one there's a navy's battery, facing the diga foranea.

== History ==
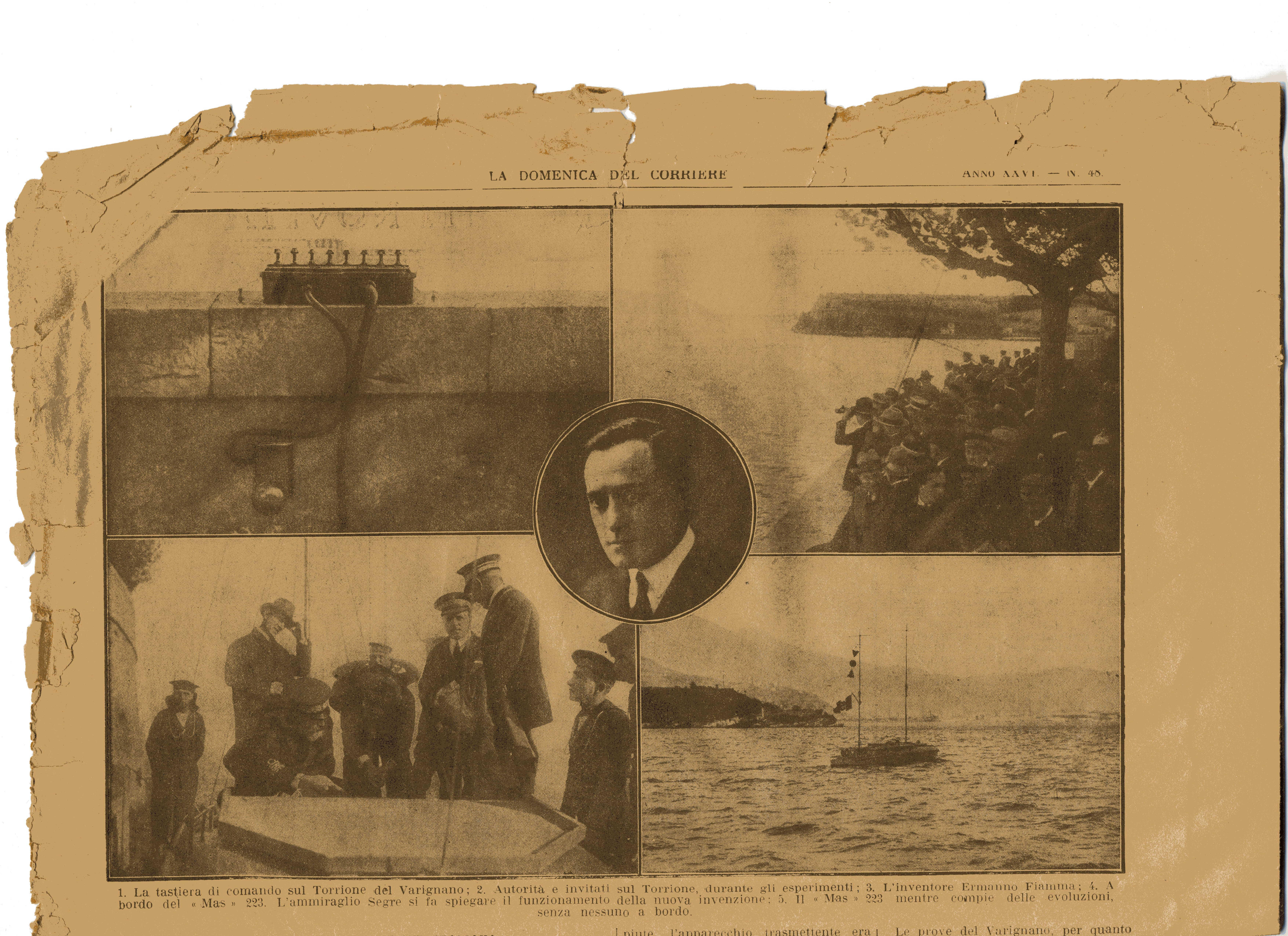
La Domenica del Corriere – 30 November 1924

The place of Varignano was already frequented in Roman times, as evidenced by the important archaeological remains of a villa from which statues and various finds from the Hadrianic age.

Medieval informations on this locality are contained in more ancient documents of the 11th century, linked to the Obertenghi family. The locality followed the events of the village of La Spezia and its gulf, with the succession of the various dominations up to the government of the Republic of Genoa.

In the early 19th century Napoleon Bonaparte ordered to prepare a project for the construction of a maritime arsenal in the inlet, protected by artillery positions located on the surrounding hills.

== Main sights ==
=== Military architecture ===
In a much later period, the Republic of Genoa, due to its isolated position, built a lazaretto there in 1724 to quarantine crews and goods. Thus the locality becomes commonly known also with the name of Lazzaretto.

The use for this function lasted until the mid-XIX century when, following the great development of La Spezia, it was necessary to permanently remove it to transfer it to the island of Asinara in 1866.

In 1862, in the fort's hospital, Giuseppe Garibaldi was hosted, wounded in the clash with the Piedmontese army at Aspromonte.

The fort, today, is the base of the Comando Subacquei ed Incursori.
