= San Venerio Lighthouse =

San Venerio
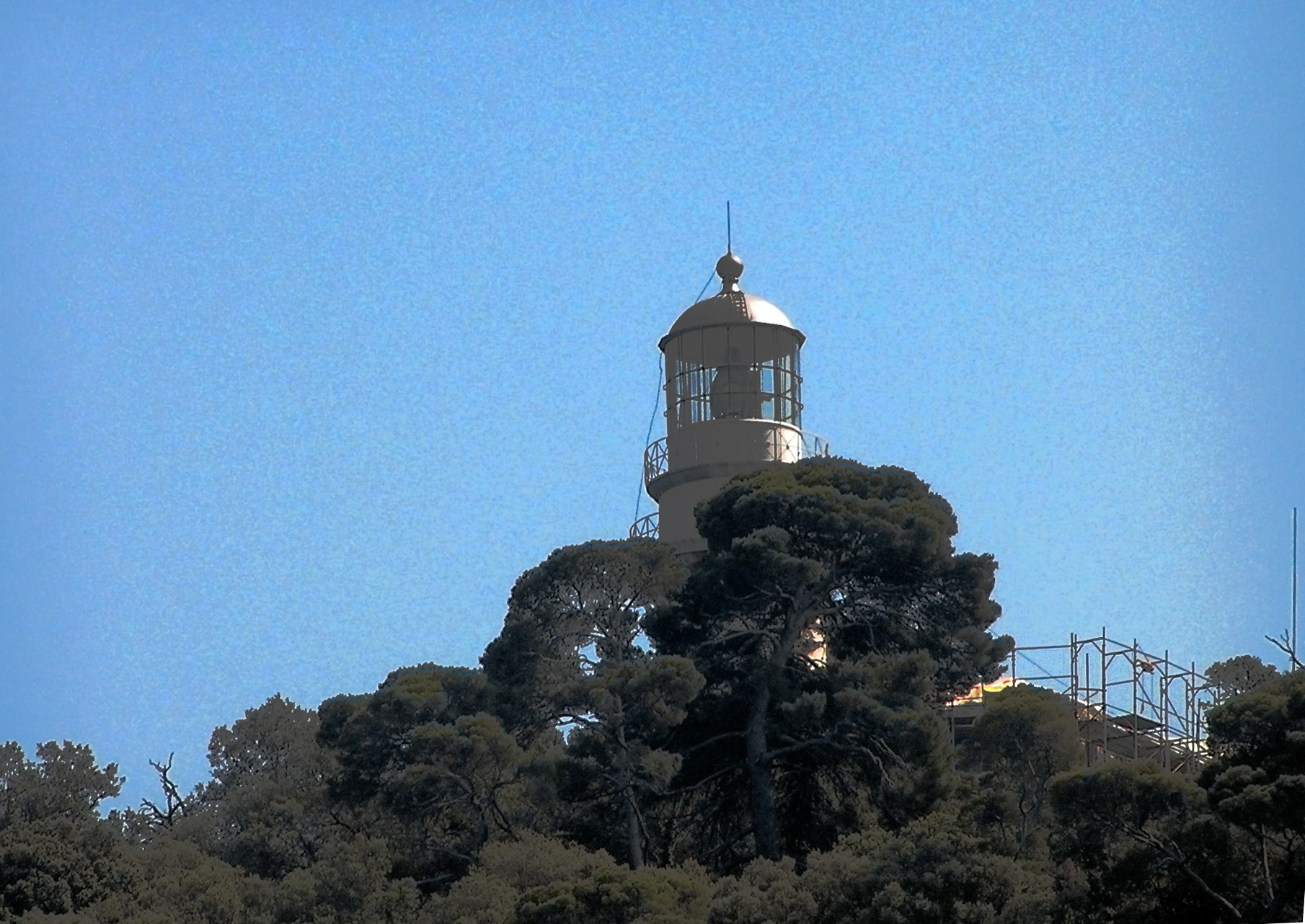
- San Venerio lighthouse, atop the island of Tino
- Location: Tino Island; La Spezia; Liguria; Italy
- Coordinates: 44°01′35″N 9°50′59″E

Tower
- Constructed: 1840 (first)
- Construction: masonry tower
- Automated: 1985
- Height: 24 metres (79 ft)
- Shape: cylindrical tower with double gallery at one corner of the keeper’s house
- Markings: white tower and lantern, grey lantern dome
- Power source: mains electricity
- Operator: Marina Militare
- Racon: T

Light
- First lit: 1884 (current)
- Focal height: 117 metres (384 ft)
- Lens: Type OR 500
- Intensity: main: AL 1000 W reserve: MBR-300L LED
- Range: main: 25 nautical miles (46 km; 29 mi) reserve: 18 nautical miles (33 km; 21 mi)
- Characteristic: FI (3) W 15 s.
- Italy no.: 1708 E.F

San Venerio Lighthouse (Italian: Faro di San Venerio) is an active lighthouse on the island of Tino, in the comune of Porto Venere in the Province of La Spezia, Liguria, Italy. Its construction began in 1839, and was completed in 1840. It illuminates and guides the sailors in that part of Ligurian Sea. It is named for Venerius the Hermit, the patron saint of lighthouse keepers.

== History ==
San Venerio Lighthouse is a fortified neoclassical building, despite having undergone many changes over time. Construction of the lighthouse was granted by King Charles Albert of Savoy and was initially fueled by vegetable oil, followed later by coal. In 1884 another tower was built, taller than the original at 30 metres (98 ft) high, and at the top of the lenses an optical filament was added, electrically powered by two steam engines. This system gave too much power to the beam of light, and in 1912 the fuel was replaced with petroleum. The lighthouse was later electrified, and became fully automated in 1985.

The lighthouse is completely controlled and operated by the Marina Militare based in La Spezia.

In the evening, near Lerici (located on the opposite side of the Gulf of La Spezia) or the Cinque Terre the light can be seen flashing across the sea in the darkness.

== See also ==
- List of lighthouses in Italy
