= Venerius the Hermit =

7th-century Italian saint

Venerius
- Born: c. 560; Palmaria island
- Died: 630; Tino island
- Venerated in: Catholic Church
- Feast: 13 September
- Attributes: Monk's habit, raven (legendary)
- Patronage: Gulf of La Spezia, lighthouse keepers

Saint Venerius ((in Italian) San Venerio) (ca. 560–630) was a monk and hermit. He is venerated as a saint by the Catholic Church and is the patron saint of the Gulf of La Spezia and, as of 1961, the patron saint of lighthouse keepers. Traditions concerning him are very uncertain.

== Life ==
Venerius was born around 560 on the island of Palmaria. He became a hermit in a monastery situated on the island of Tino in the Ligurian Sea. Later he served as abbot until his death in 630. According to legend, a raven brought him food every day.

It is thought that a sanctuary was constructed at the place of Venerius' death to contain his relics and that this was extended to form the Benedictine Abbey of San Venerio in eleventh century. The remains of the monastery can be seen on the northern coast of the island.

The relics of the saint seem to have resided in Luni, but due to attacks by Vikings and Moors, the bishopric transferred its seat to Sarzana. The relics of Venerius were sent, however, to Reggio Emilia, where they were placed side-by-side with those of Saint Prosper of Reggio (San Prospero) and those of Cosmas and Damian. They were later translated to Tino, now within the diocese of La Spezia, in a solemn ceremony.

The island of Tino has restricted access as part of a military zone. However, an exception is made on 13 September, the Feast of Saint Venerius. On that day, a statue of Venerius is carried out to the sea from La Spezia to the island, accompanied by a blessing by the bishop of all of the boats in the Gulf of La Spezia.

San Venerio Lighthouse is named in honor of him, as is the Pieve di San Venerio in La Spezia. Porto Venere derives its name from him.

== Footnotes ==
- No reliable account exists of Venerius' life. Some scholars place it in the ninth century.
