= Scola Tower =

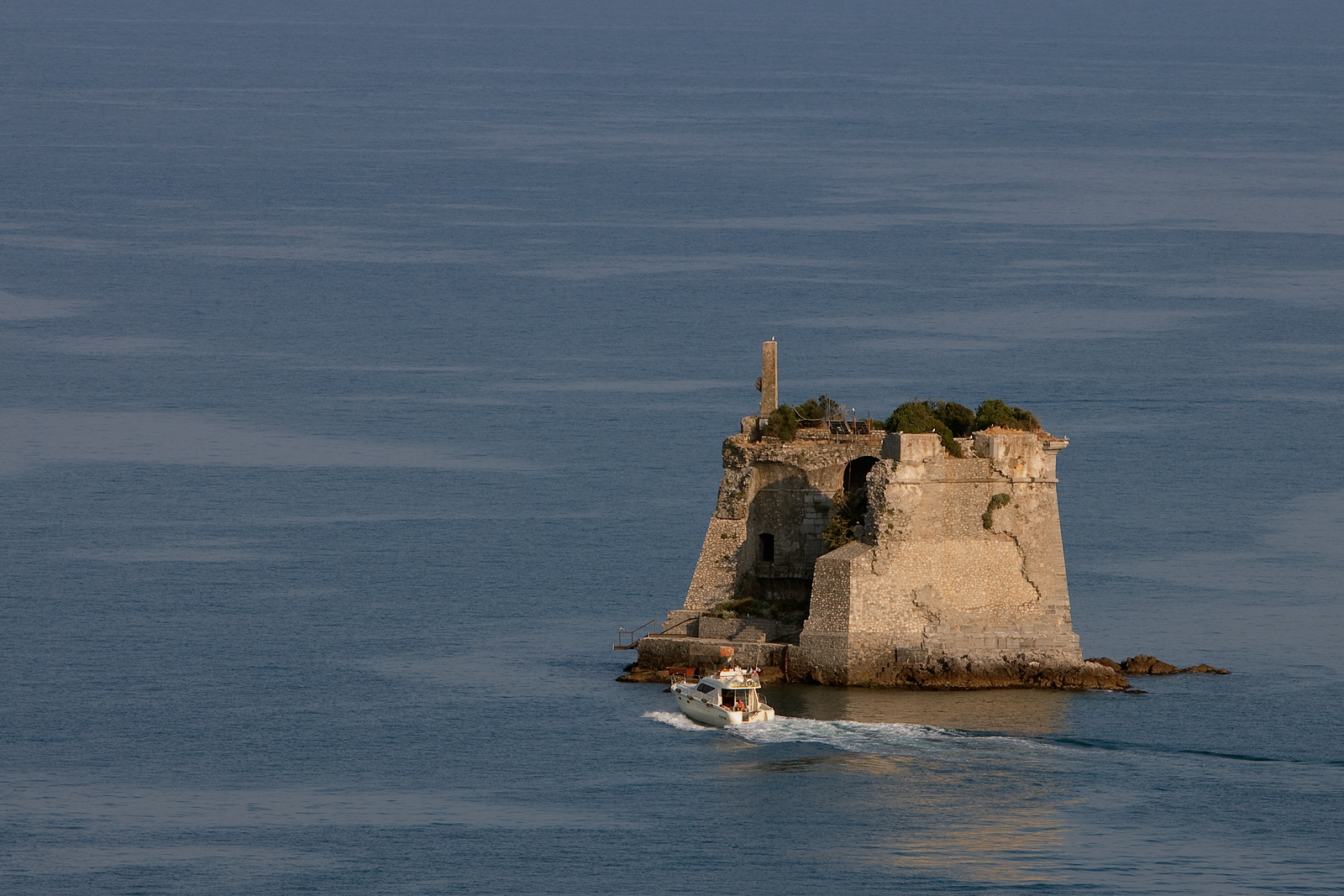

Religion
- Affiliation: Roman Catholic
- Diocese: Liguria
- Province: La Spezia
- Ecclesiastical or organizational status: Military Tower

Location
- Location: Italy
- Interactive map of Scola Tower

Architecture
- Groundbreaking: 17th century
- Completed: 17th century
- Construction cost: 56.000 genoese liras

Specifications
- Height (max): 13 metres (43 ft)
- Materials: marble, stone

The Scola Tower - or tower of St. John the Baptist - is a military building located just beyond the northeastern tip (called tip Scola) of Palmaria (island) in Porto Venere, in the Gulf of Poets in the province of La Spezia, Italy. It is part of, along with the Fort Cavour and Umberto I and the Batteria Semaforo, the defensive positions of Palmaria.

== History and description ==
As with other coastal towers and lookouts of the Ligurian coast, the Scola Tower is part of a defensive system originally desired by the Senate of the Republic of Genoa in the 16th and 17th centuries for the purposes of protecting the coast and, consequently, the towns and villages. According to some studies, the tower may have been built in the early 17th century for an estimated cost of 56,000 Genoese liras, and was in response to new ballistic technologies which forced the Senate of Genoa to a rapid conversion of existing defensive sites and the creation of new ones.

The tower is pentagonal in shape with an average wall thickness of about 4 metres (13 ft), which accommodates up to eight people (eight soldiers, including a captain and a master "bombardero") and ten cannons, and guards the Bay of Palmaria, Porto Venere and Lerici.

During the Napoleonic Wars, it was at the centre of a naval engagement on 23 January 1800 between the British and French fleets, and was damaged by the British through their efforts to remove the latter from the Gulf of La Spezia, leaving it in a state of total neglect for the first half of the 19th century.

Used for target practice by the Marina Militare and scheduled for demolition in 1915, it was saved by catching the interest of Ubaldo Mazzini, a local official at the Ministry of Education, and it was eventually decided to convert the tower to a lighthouse. Between 1976 and 1980, the structure underwent major restoration and consolidation of the perimeter wall.

== See also ==
- List of islands of Italy
