= San Pietro, Porto Venere =

Church in Porto Venere, Italy

Coordinates: 44°02′54″N 9°49′57″E

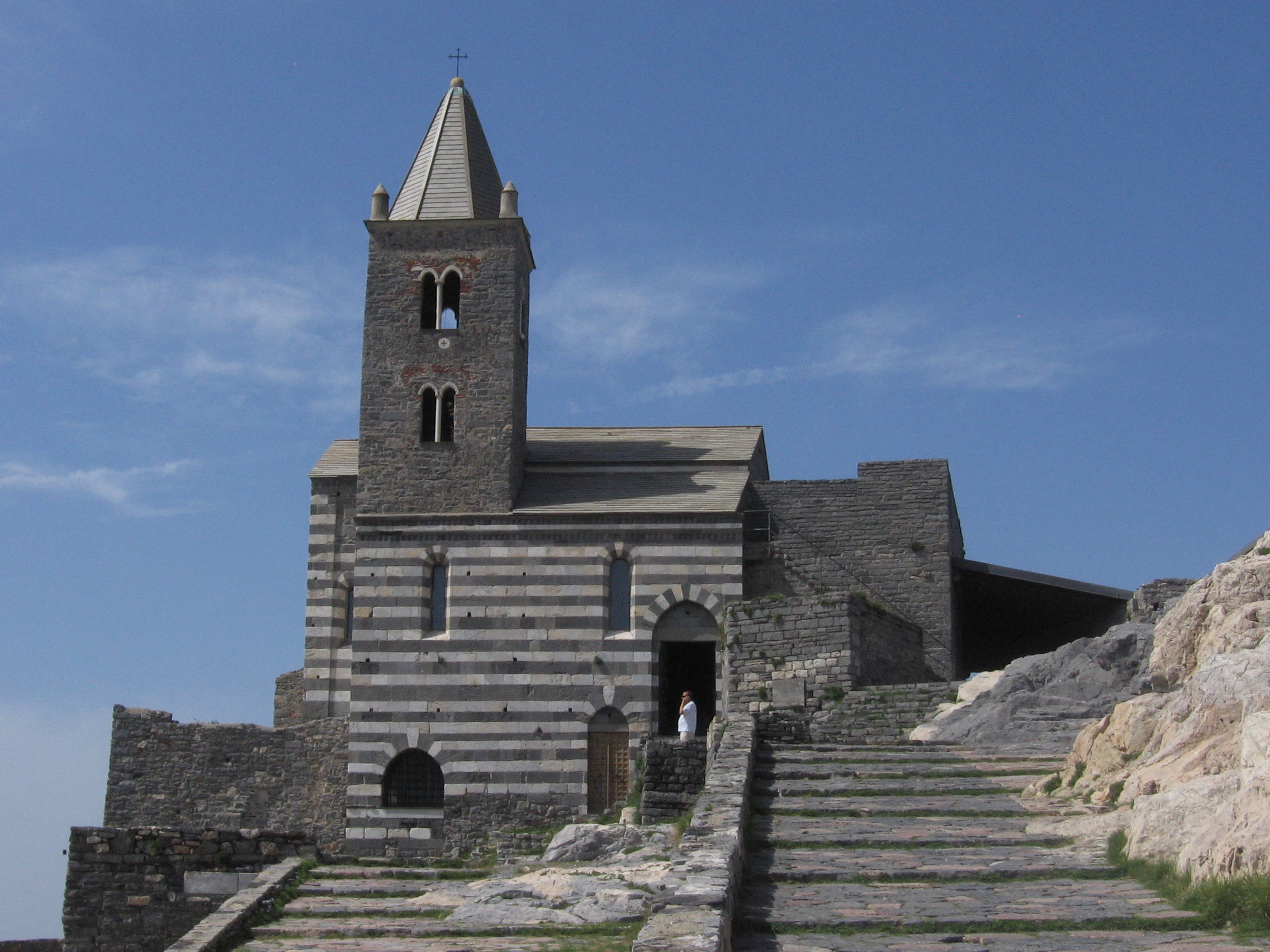
The church of St. Peter

San Pietro ("St. Peter") is a Roman Catholic church in Porto Venere, province of La Spezia, northern Italy, facing the Gulf of Poets.

The Church was built upon an ancient Pagan Temple.

== History and description ==
It was officially consecrated in 1198. The part in white and black bands dates from the 13th century (probably made between 1256 and 1277) and was restored between 1931 and 1935. This part was derived from an older body, which consists of the early church, but left the bell tower is based on the chapel left of the presbytery.

The original church dates from the 5th century, in Syriac type, with rectangular plan and semicircular apse. It lost the title of parish in the late 14th century, in favor of the Church of San Lorenzo. It was officiated by the secular clergy until 1798.

== Literary references ==
The poet Eugenio Montale dedicated a poem to the church.

== Gallery ==
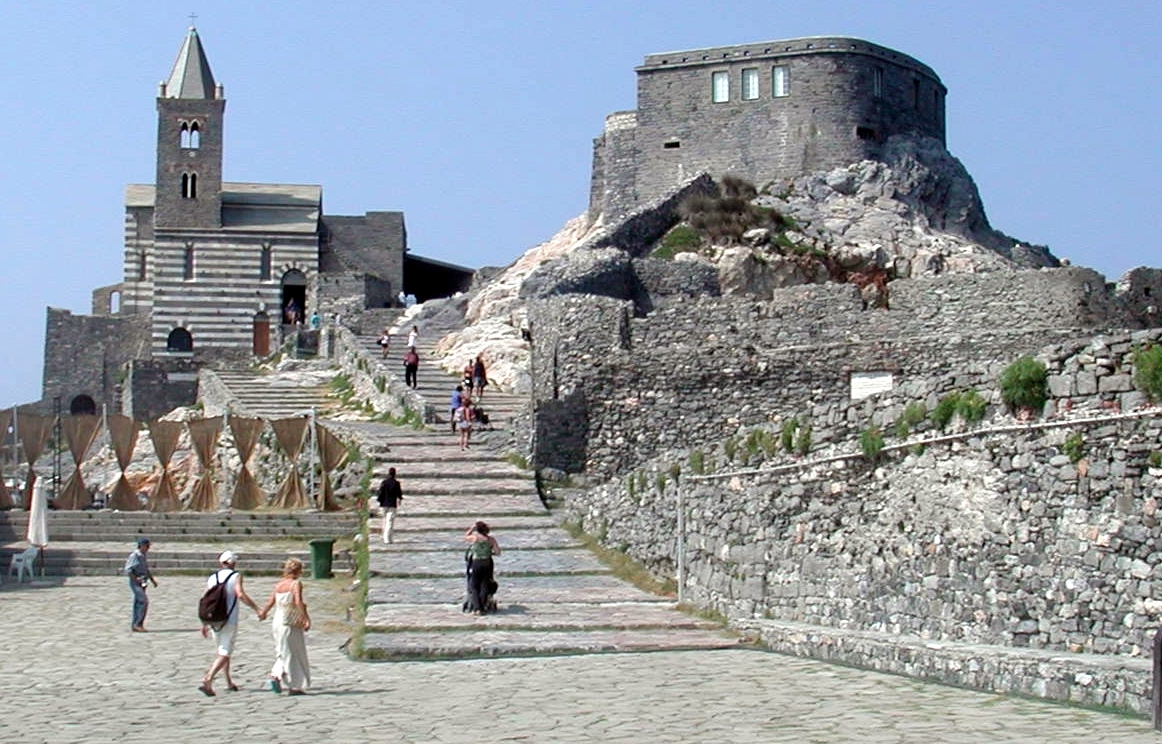
The Church of St. Peter and the Spallanzani square

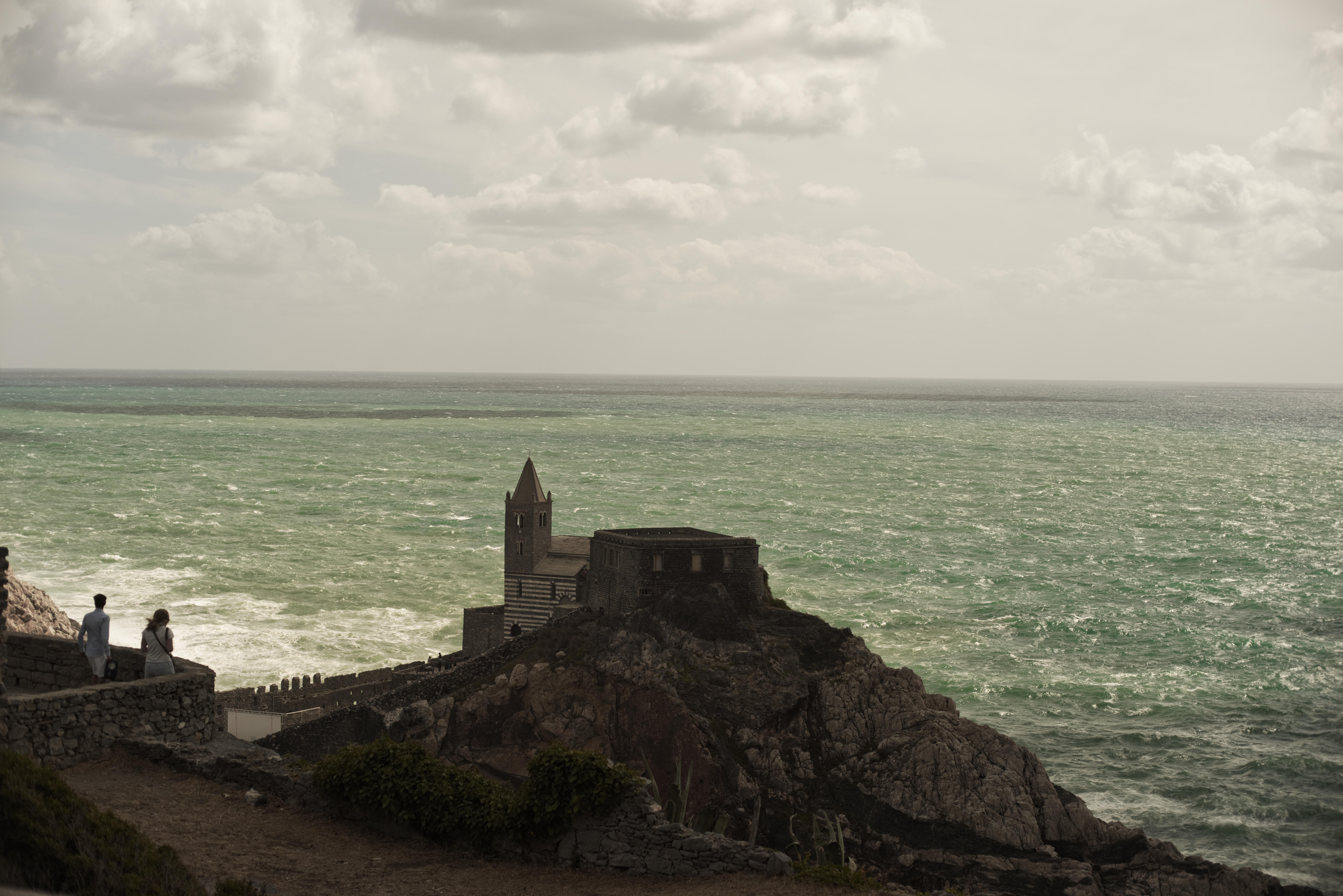
Setting on the Sea

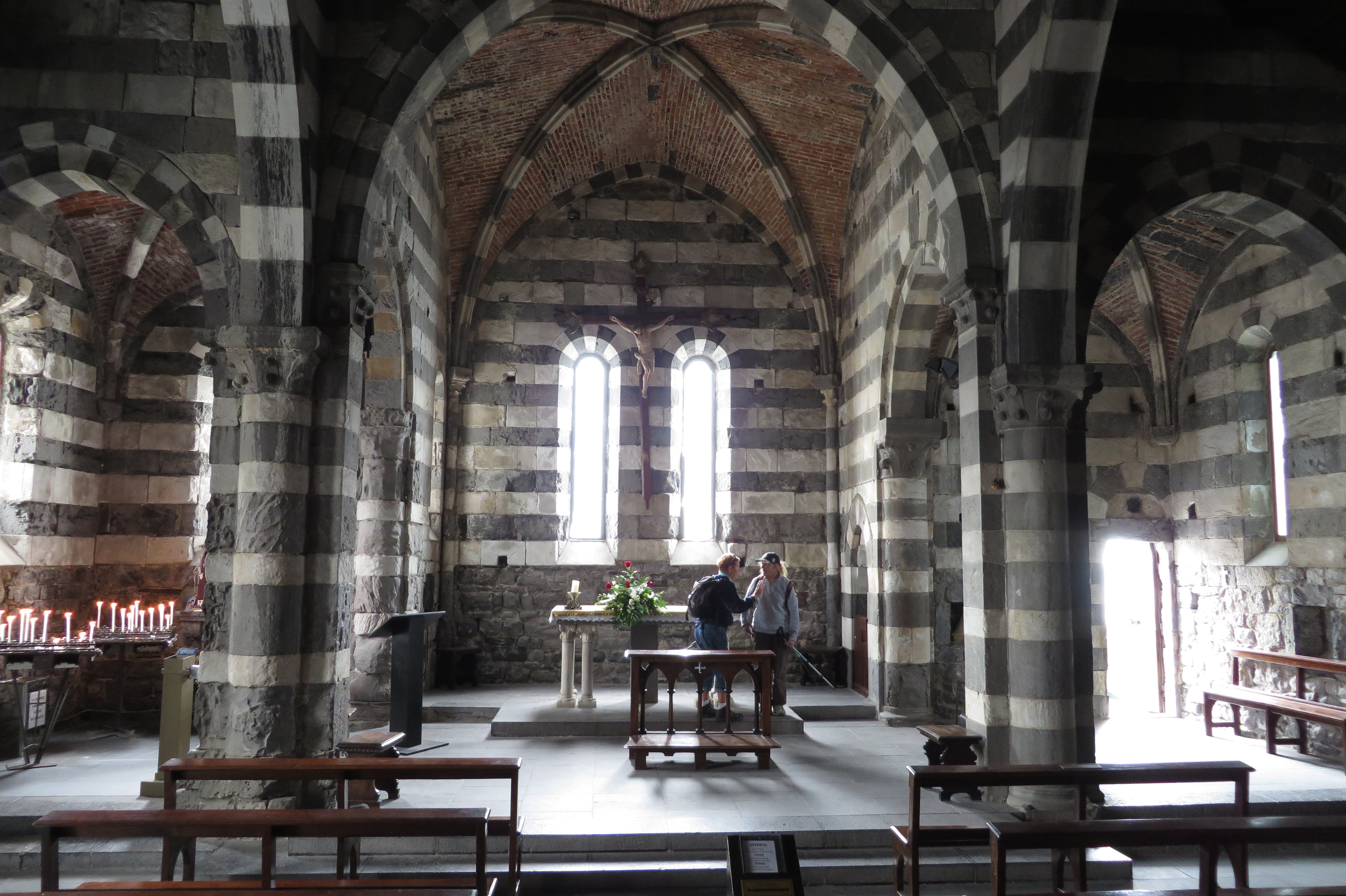
Inside the Church

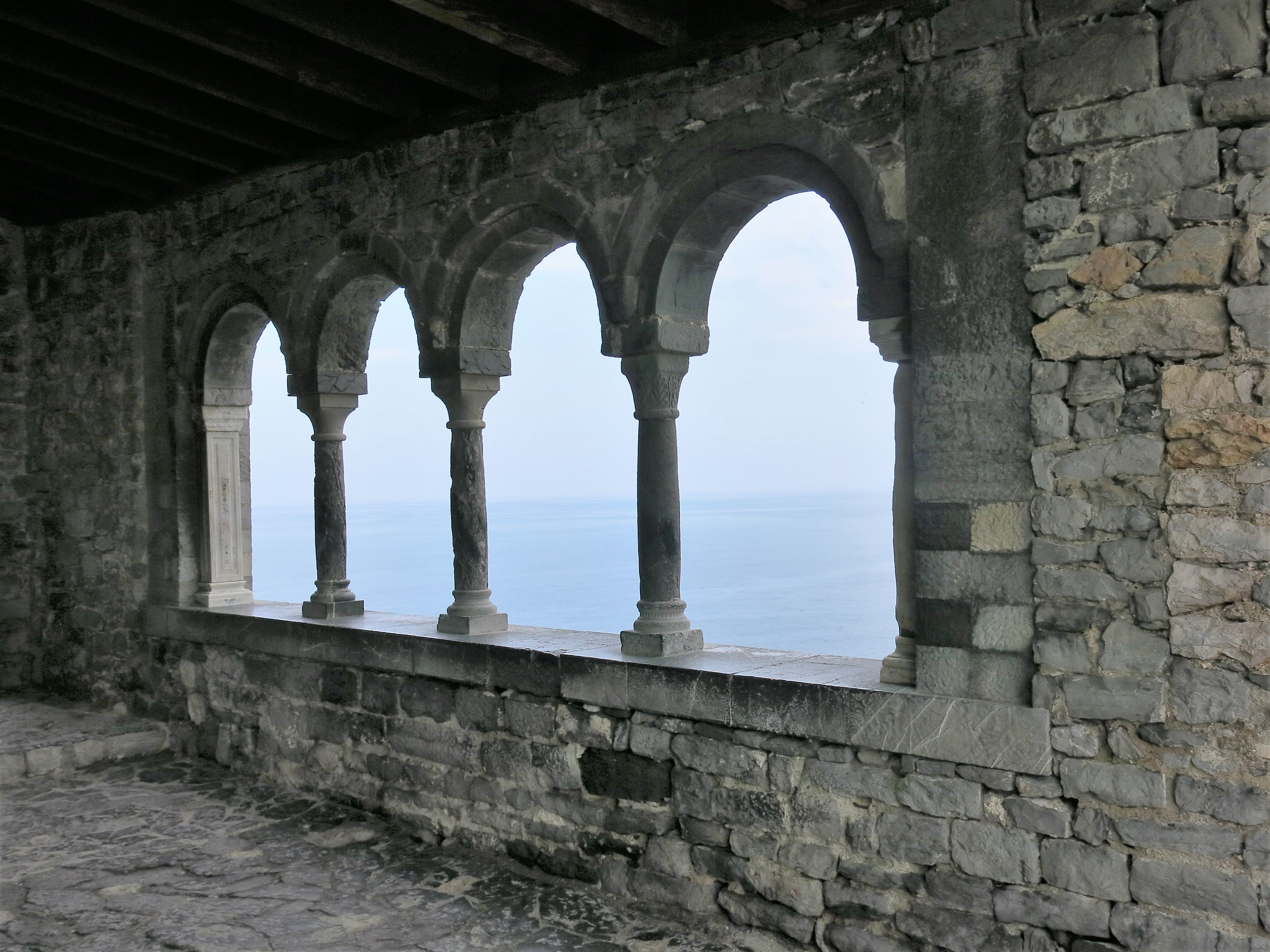
Arcades of the Church

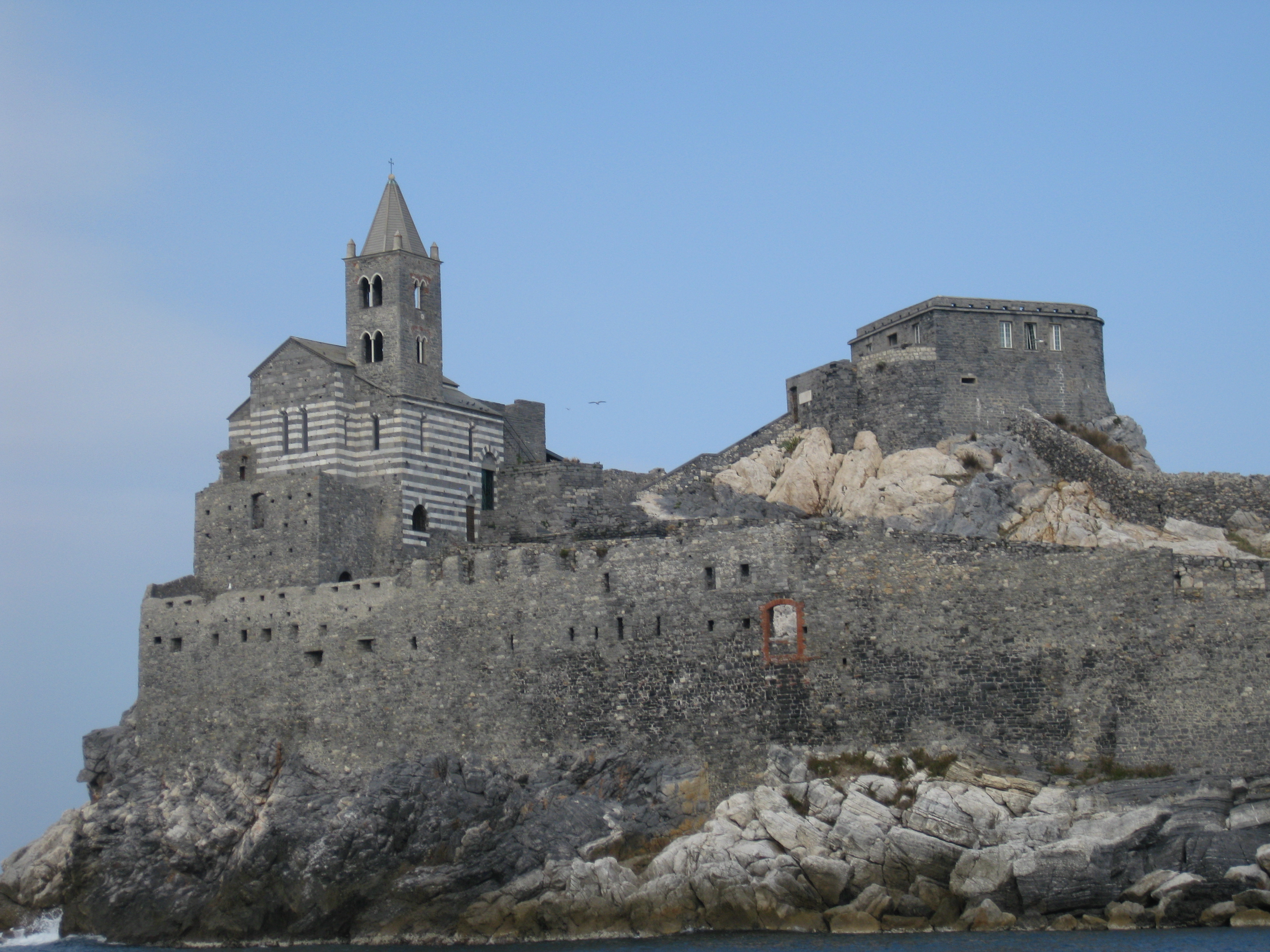
The Church kept from a boat
