= Tinetto =

UNESCO World Heritage Site
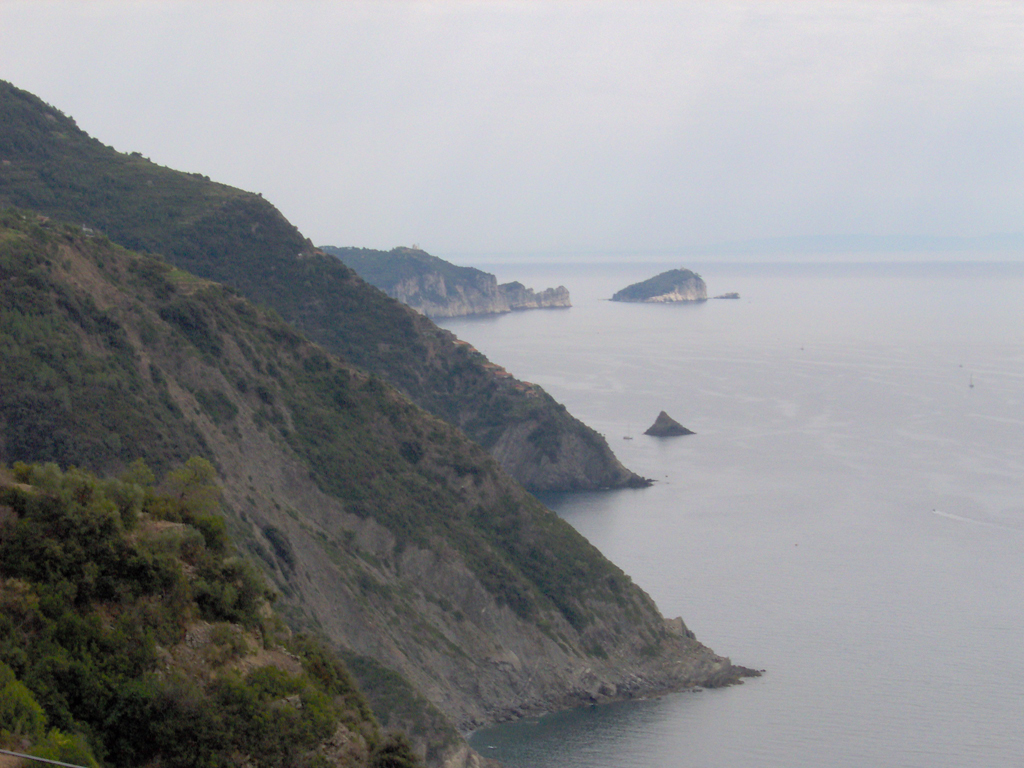

- Location within Liguria Location within Italy
- Official name: Isola del Tinetto
- Location: Porto Venere, Province of La Spezia, Liguria, Italy
- Part of: Portovenere, Cinque Terre, and the Islands (Palmaria, Tino and Tinetto)
- Criteria: Cultural: (ii)(iv)(v)
- Reference: 826-004
- Inscription: 1997 (21st Session)
- Area: 4.69 ha (11.6 acres)
- Coordinates: 44°01′24.63″N 9°51′04.55″E

Tinetto is an Italian island situated in the Gulf of La Spezia, in the eastern part of the Ligurian Sea. It is part of an archipelago of three closely spaced islands jutting out south from the mainland at Portovenere. In 1997, the archipelago, together with Portovenere, Cinque Terre, and the Islands were designated by UNESCO as a World Heritage Site.

== Wildlife ==
A subspecies of the common wall lizard, Podarcis muralis tinettoi, is endemic to the island.

== See also ==
- List of islands of Italy
