= Gino Montefinale =

Italian admiral, writer and artist

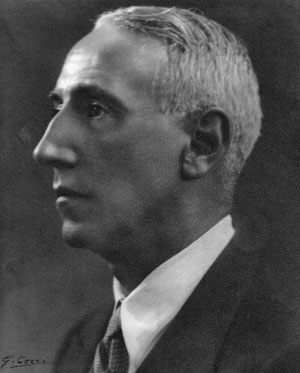
Gino Montefinale

Gino Montefinale (9 June 1881 in Portovenere, Italy – 21 December 1974 in Genoa) was an Italian admiral, writer and artist.

== Biography ==
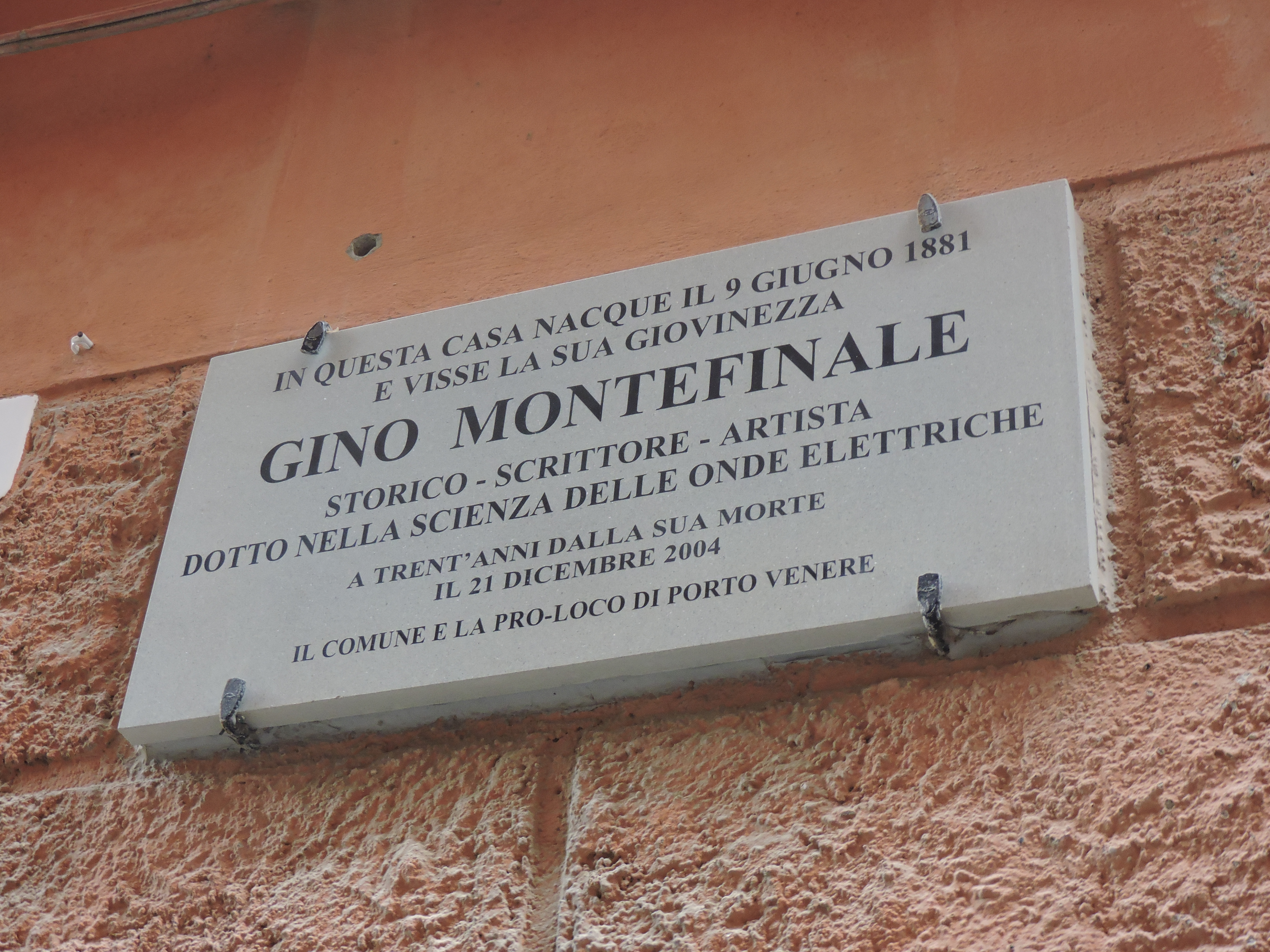
Plaque dedicated to him in Portovenere

Montefinale was born in Portovenere from an ancient and illustrious family, the father and grandfather were doctors of the village. He attended elementary school in Portovenere, where he lived a happy childhood with his companions, all children of fishermen. He continued his studies at the institute Da Passano in La Spezia following the section of mathematics and physics until graduation. Later he attended the Naval Academy in Livorno, where he distinguished himself for his extraordinary skill at sea, and scientific techniques which have led to the conquest of fame, especially for its active collaboration with the scientist Guglielmo Marconi and in 1963 the engineer Montefinale awarded the "Golden Frond". Many were his journalistic collaborations on scientific and historical adviser was Hoepli encyclopedia in the field of radio-telecommunications Museums of Technology in Milan and Naval in La Spezia. In addition to scientific books, the engineer has left to posterity important historical argument, which reveal his deep love for the village of Portovenere. He died in Genoa, on 21 December 1974.
