= Tino (island) =

UNESCO World Heritage Site
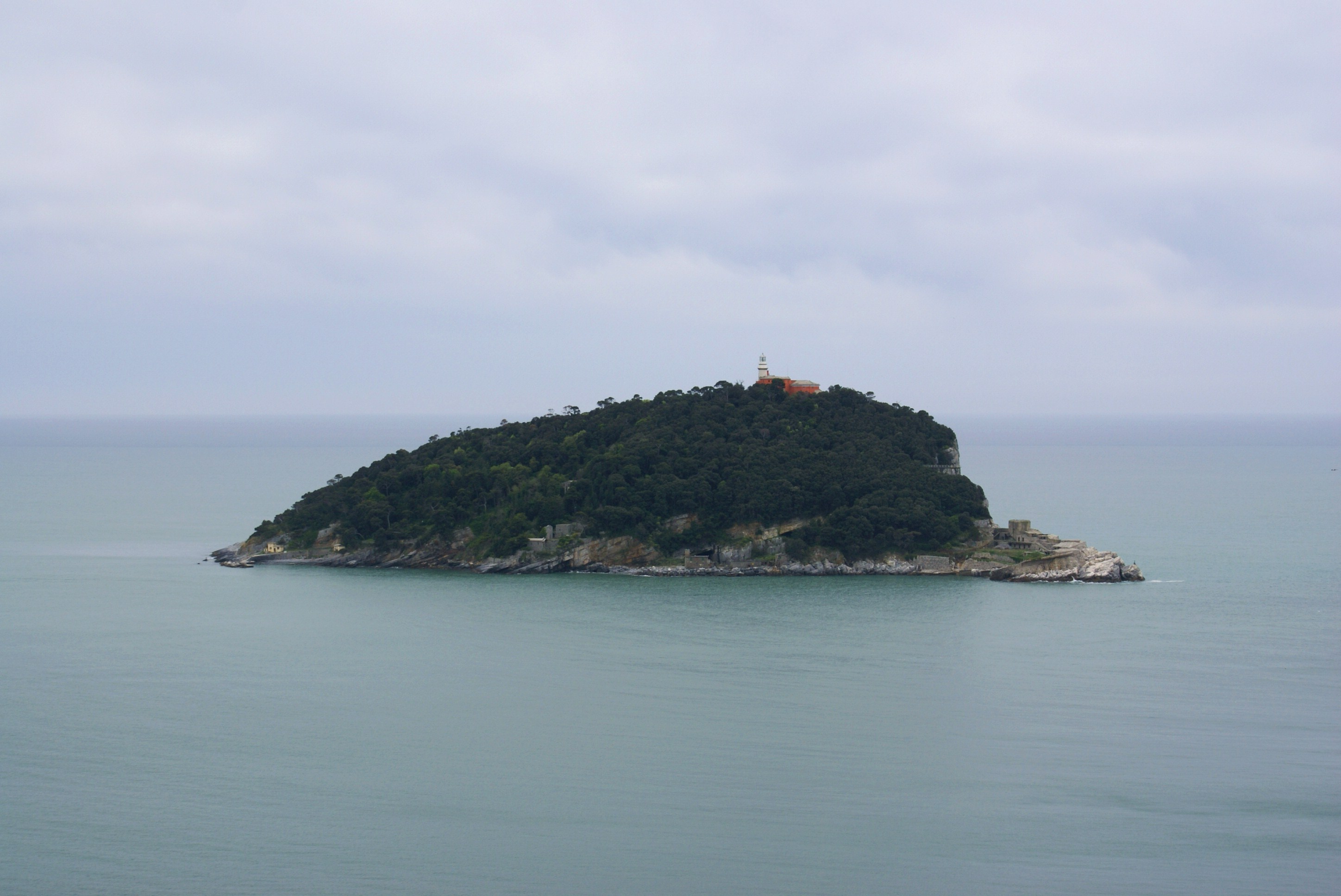

- Location within Liguria Location within Italy
- Official name: Isola del Tino
- Location: Porto Venere, Province of La Spezia, Liguria, Italy
- Part of: Portovenere, Cinque Terre, and the Islands (Palmaria, Tino and Tinetto)
- Criteria: Cultural: (ii)(iv)(v)
- Reference: 826-003
- Inscription: 1997 (21st Session)
- Area: 13.31 ha (32.9 acres)
- Coordinates: 44°01′38″N 9°51′02″E

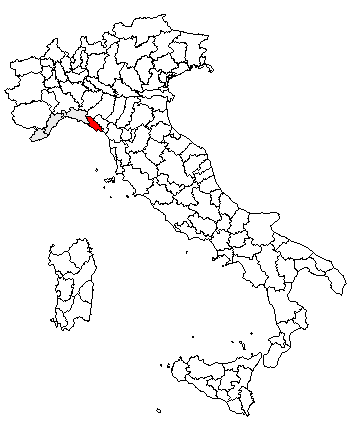
Location of the province of La Spezia

Tino is an Italian island situated in the Ligurian Sea, at the westernmost end of the Gulf of La Spezia. It is part of an archipelago of three closely spaced islands jutting out south from the mainland at Portovenere. The largest of the three, Palmaria, lies to the north and the tiny Tinetto to the south.

In 1997, the archipelago, together with Portovenere and the Cinque Terre, was designated by UNESCO as a World Heritage Site.

== History ==
The patron saint of the Gulf of La Spezia, Saint Venerius (Italian: San Venerio), is said to have lived on the island as a hermit, and later as abbot, until his death in 630. His feast is celebrated here annually on 13 September. It is thought that a sanctuary was constructed at the place of Venerio's death to contain his remains and that this was extended to form a monastery in eleventh century. The remains of the monastery can be seen on the northern coast of the island.

Today the island, which is part of a military zone, is surmounted by the San Venerio Lighthouse.

== In popular culture ==
The Isola del Mare in the 2021 animated film Luca was inspired by Tino.

== See also ==
- List of islands of Italy

== Gallery ==
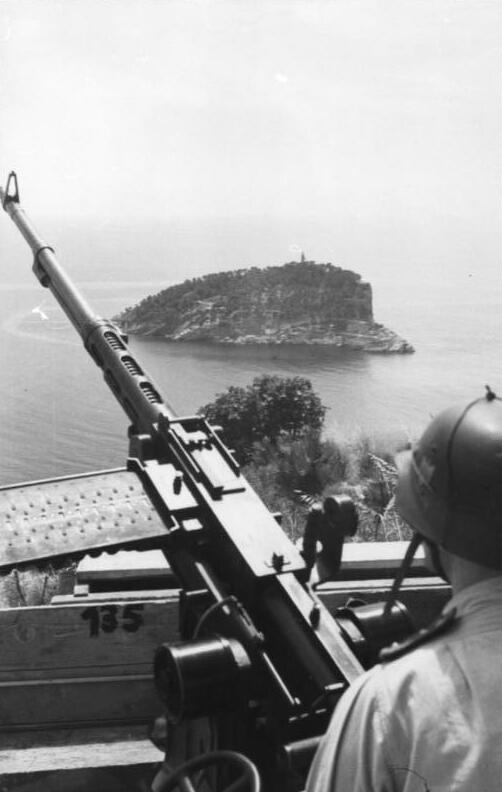
German soldiers in 1944, during the Second World War

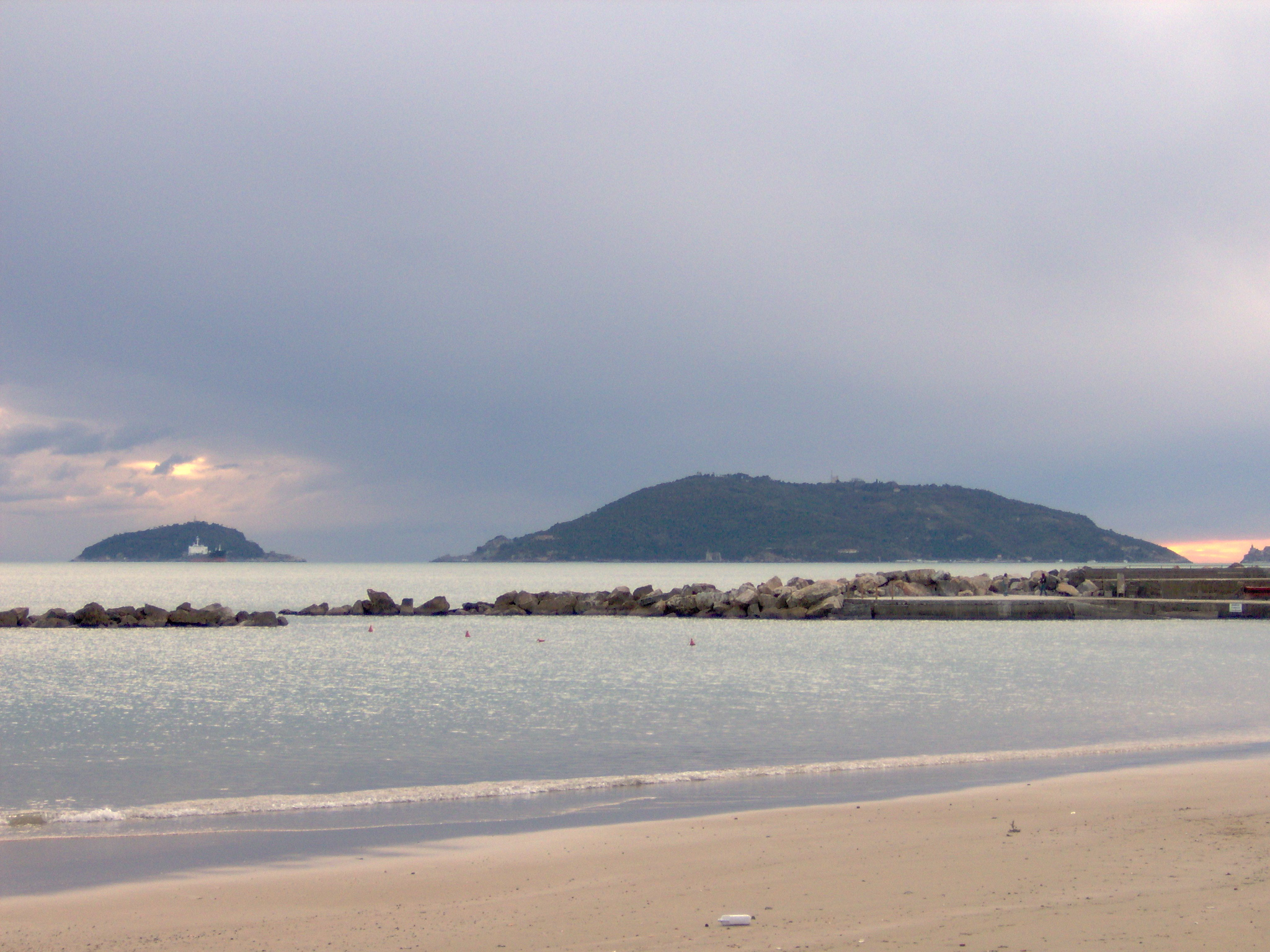
Palmaria and Tino from the beach of San Terenzo

== Sources ==
- Much of this article is based its equivalent in the Italian Wikipedia, Tino, as retrieved on 29 April 2006.
- Further information on Saint Venerius from The Book of Saints, London: A & C Black, 1989.
