= Varignano Roman Villa =

Coordinates: 44.0649°N 9.8403°E

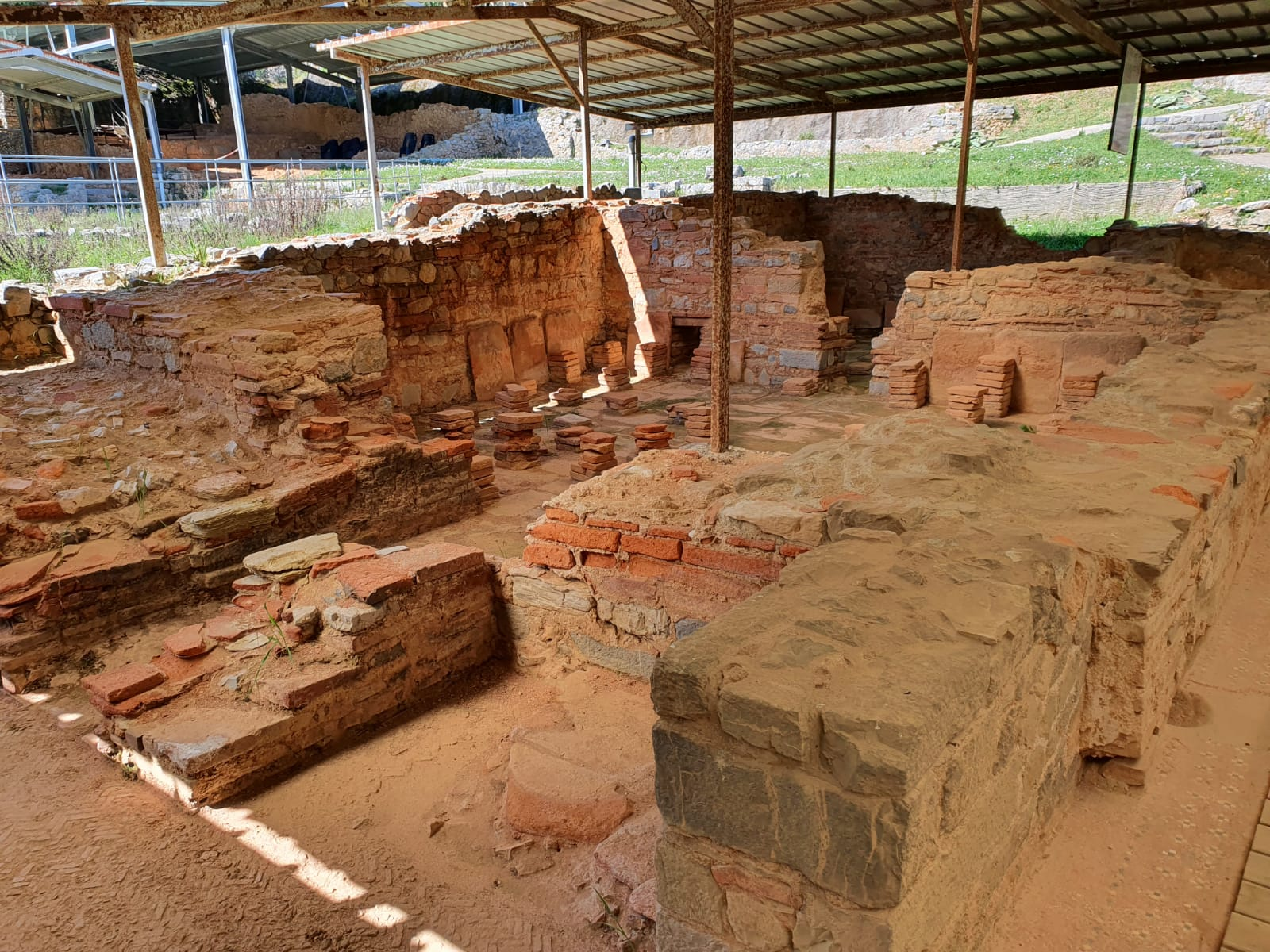
Varignano Roman Villa: a section of the excavations

Varignano Roman Villa is an ancient Roman residence located in Varignano, now a frazione of the town of Porto Venere in the province of La Spezia, Italy. Its site is marked by an archaeological museum.

== History ==
Its first construction phase dates back to the 1st century BCE, primarily consisting of a house surrounded by a farm linked to olive oil production. The site is situated beside the Seno del Varignano Vecchio, overlooking the sea, near the santuario delle Grazie, and to the northeast, the Fortezza del Varignano.

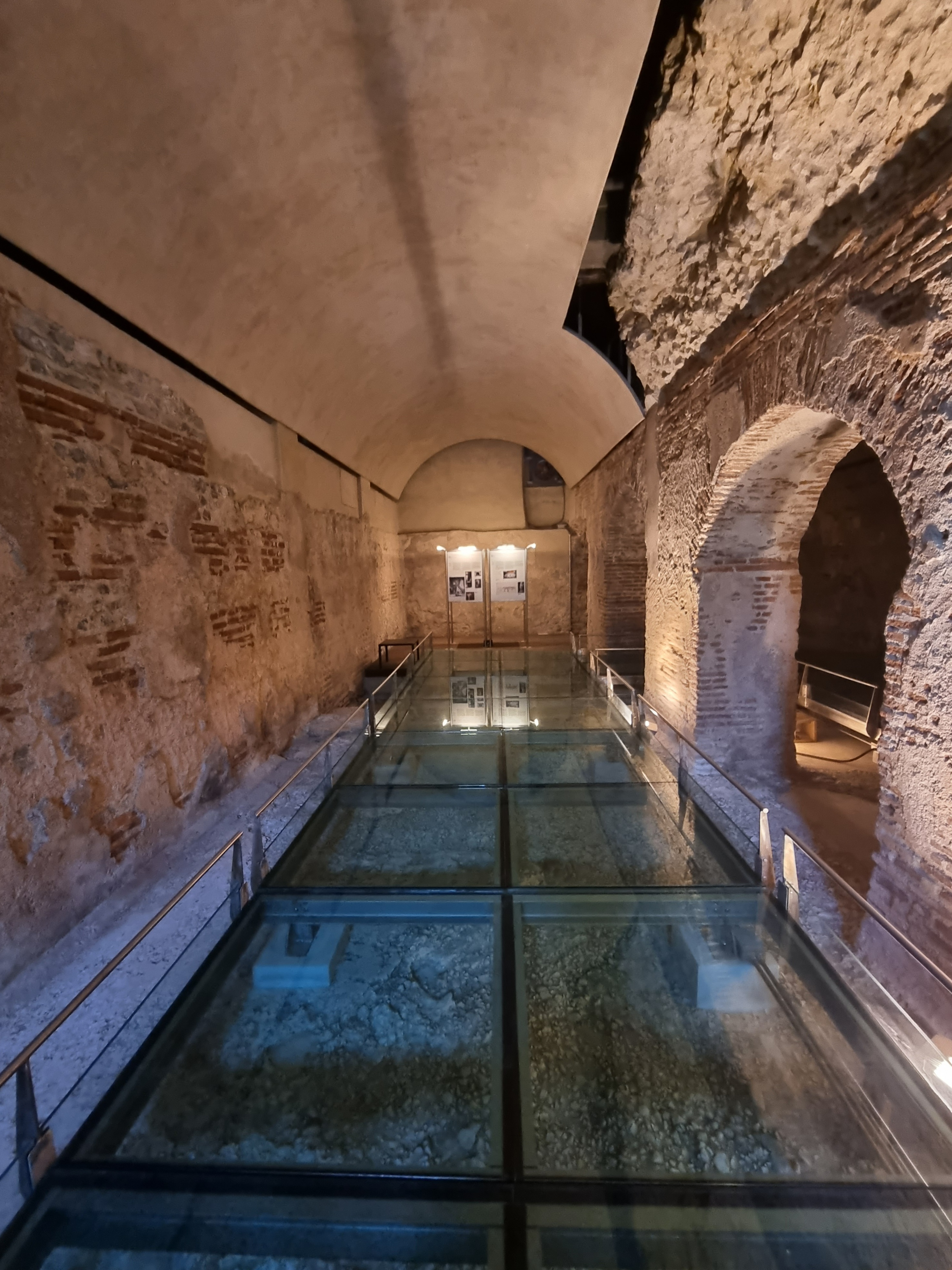
Varignano Roman Villa: Porto Venere

Its main area, the pars urbana, and the productive area, the pars fructuaria, were separated by a courtyard used for 'torcularium,' where olives were pressed for their oil. The owner's residence was single-story, featuring atria paved with mosaics, living rooms, and bedrooms. The olive oil processing area contained two presses and a 'cella oleario' that were active until the 1st century AD. At that time, olive oil production ceased, and the vilicus underwent a major rebuild, including the construction of a set of heated rooms and private frigidaria. The cistern associated with these rooms is considered almost unique among similar buildings in northern Italy. This residence remained active until the 6th century.
