= Palmaria (island) =

Italian island

Coordinates: 44°02′34.21″N 9°50′37.92″E

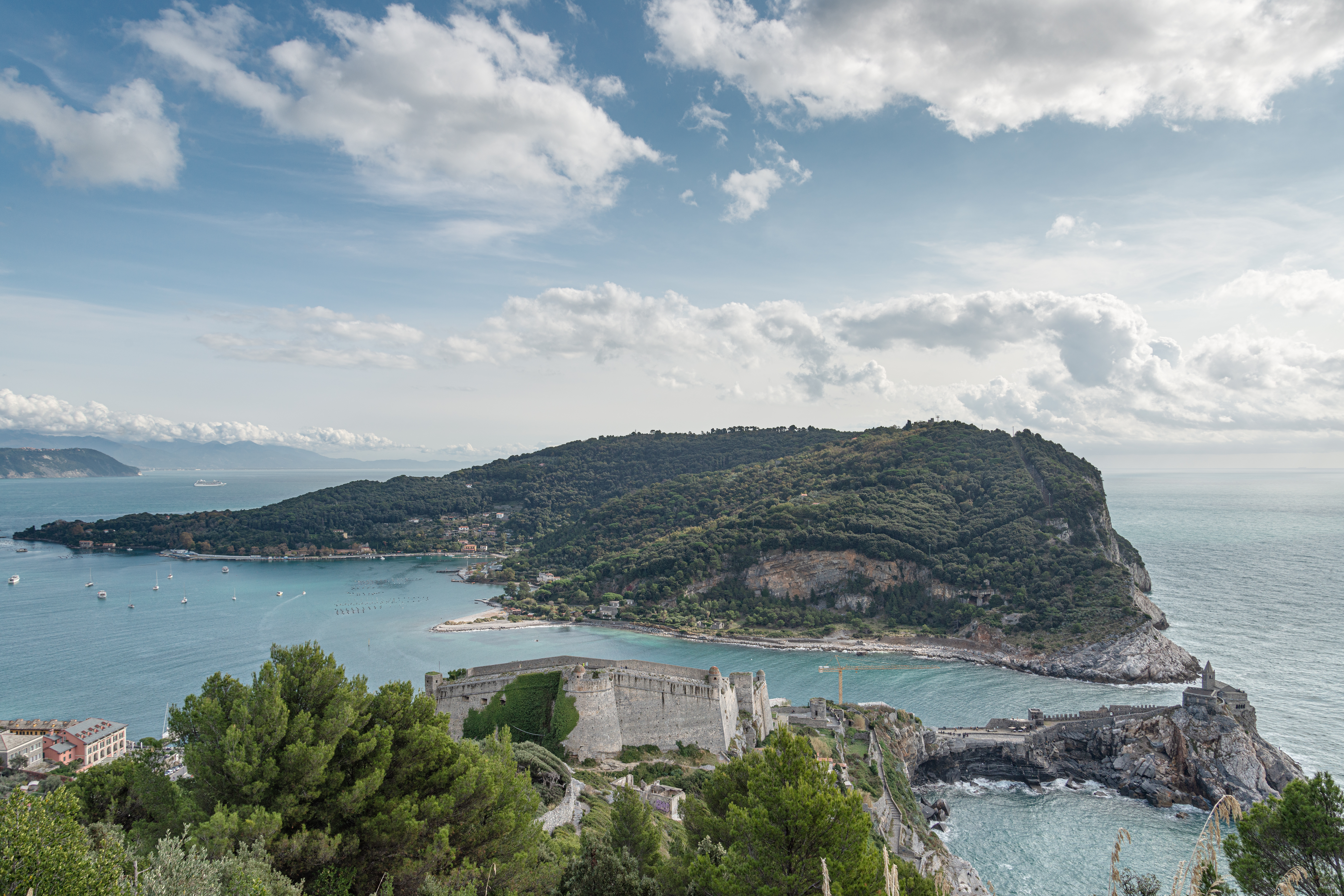

Geography
- Location: Ligurian Sea
- Archipelago: Archipelago di Portovenere
- Total islands: 3
- Major islands: Palmaria, Tino and Tinetto
- Area: 189 km^{2} (73 sq mi)
- Highest elevation: 190,6 m (6253 ft)

Administration
- Italy
- Region: Liguria
- Province: La Spezia

UNESCO World Heritage Site
- Official name: Portovenere, Cinque Terre, and the Islands (Palmaria, Tino and Tinetto)
- Type: Cultural
- Criteria: ii, iv, v
- Designated: 1997 (21st session)
- Reference no.: 826
- Region: Europe and North America

Palmaria is an Italian island situated in the Ligurian Sea, at the westernmost end of the Gulf of La Spezia. With an area of 1.6 square kilometres (0.6 sq mi), it is the largest island of an archipelago of three closely spaced islands jutting from the mainland at Portovenere. The outer islands, Tino and the tiny Tinetto, lie further south.

In 1997, the archipelago was designated by UNESCO as a World Heritage Site that also includes Portovenere and the Cinque Terre.

== Description ==
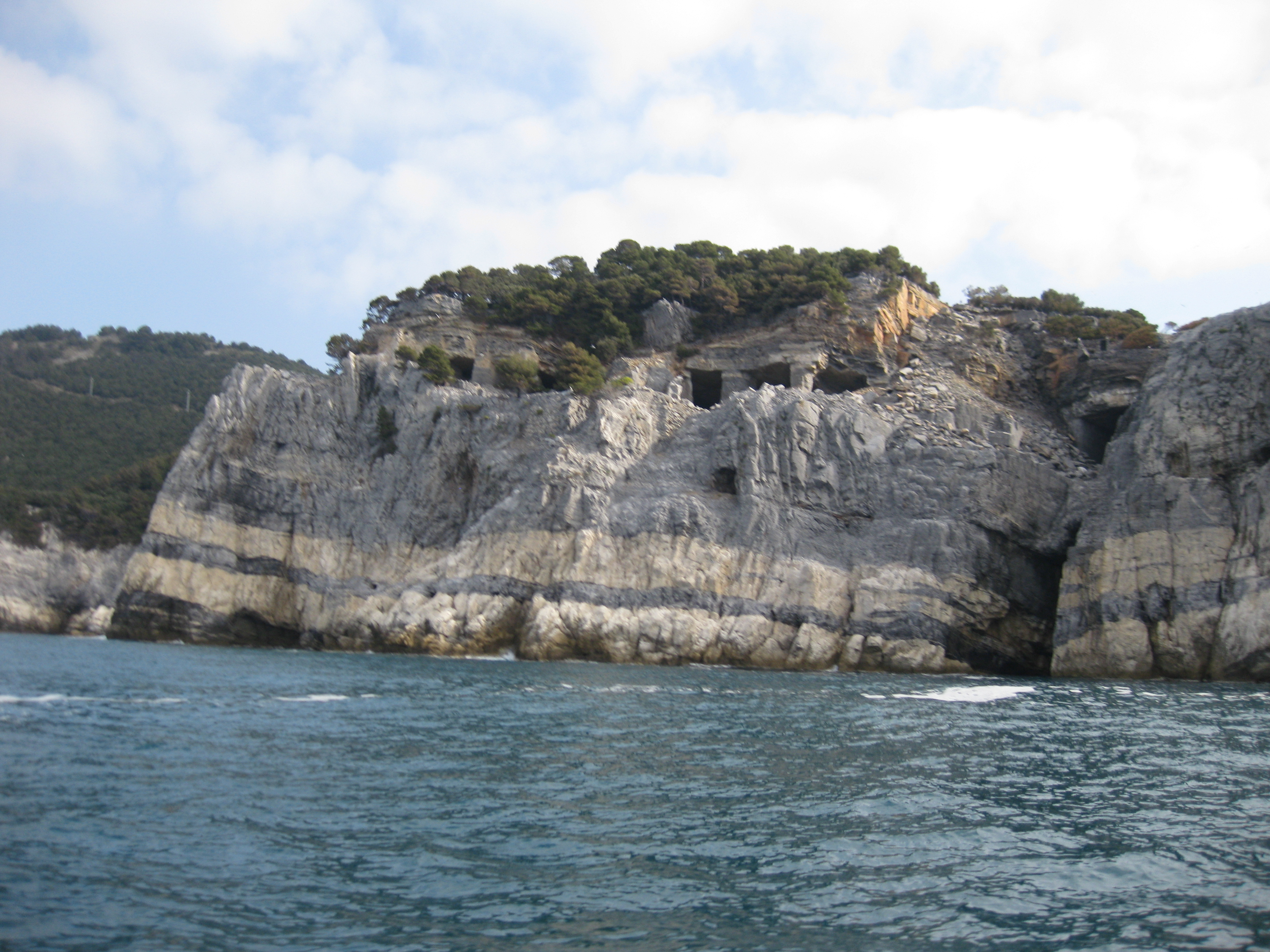
The marble caves

The island of Palmaria's area of 1.89 square kilometres (0.73 sq mi) makes it the largest of the three islands in the Gulf of La Spezia. The other two islands, Tino and Tinetto, are just a few hundred meters to the south. Palmaria is also the largest island in the whole Liguria region.

The island has a triangular shape: the sides that face Portovenere and the Gulf of La Spezia are the most populated and slope gently down to the level of the sea, covered by typical Mediterranean vegetation. The side that faces west, towards the open sea, features high cliffs overhanging the water, in which there are many caves. The populated sides feature some private homes, a restaurant in Pozzale, and many bathing establishments, some public and some reserved for employees of the Navy and Air Force.

The western side is the most difficult to reach. Significant landmarks are the Blue Cave, accessible only by boat, and the Cave of Pigeons reached only by climbing down ropes. The Cave of Pigeons has been very important in the study of historical events in the Gulf. The fossilized bones of Pleistocene animals such as chamois and the snowy owl have been found there, along with the remains of human burials which testify to human presence at least five thousand years ago.

On the island there are also many military buildings of great historical interest. The island's summit remains out of bounds as a former military area although it is in a state of neglect. Structures include the Fort Count of Cavour (or Fort Palmaria), the battery now used as experimental environmental education center, Batteria Semaforo near the Scola Tip, and the remains of the Albini battery. The ironclad tower Umberto I was used in World War II as a military prison and was renovated a few years ago. Scattered throughout the island there are several abandoned bunkers from the Second World War and the remains of coastal artillery and antiaircraft batteries, mostly inaccessible due to overgrowth by vegetation.

== Portoro marble ==
In Pozzale, the southern region, is an abandoned quarry once used for the extraction of the precious black marble with gold streaks called portoro. There are still remnants of the cranes and hoists that moved the blocks of marble, and the walls of the houses of the miners.

== Natural habitat ==
=== Flora ===
The flora of Palmaria is composed of about 500 species. The original vegetation, which must have consisted mainly of Mediterranean scrub and oak wood forest, was modified by anthropic causes such as fire, agriculture, and the introduction of alien plants and animals such as plane trees, palms and rabbits.

Today the pines (Pinus pinaster and Pinus halepensis) share space with typical Mediterranean species such as holly oak (Quercus ilex), downy oak (Quercus pubescens), mastic (Pistacia lentiscus), strawberry tree (Arbutus unedo), rockrose (Cistus monspeliensis, Cistus salvifolius, Cistus incanus), Spanish broom (Spartium junceum).

Other important plant groups include spurge (Euphorbia dendroides) and close to the sea cliffs, samphire (Crithmum maritimum). Among the new flora, Centaurea cineraria veneris, Iberis umbellata var. linifolia, are exclusive in Palmaria, and Centaurea aplolepa lunensis is endemic to eastern Liguria. Other notable plants include Brassica oleracea robertiana, Serapias neglecta and Cistus incanus, which are otherwise rare in Liguria, their northern limit.

=== Fauna ===
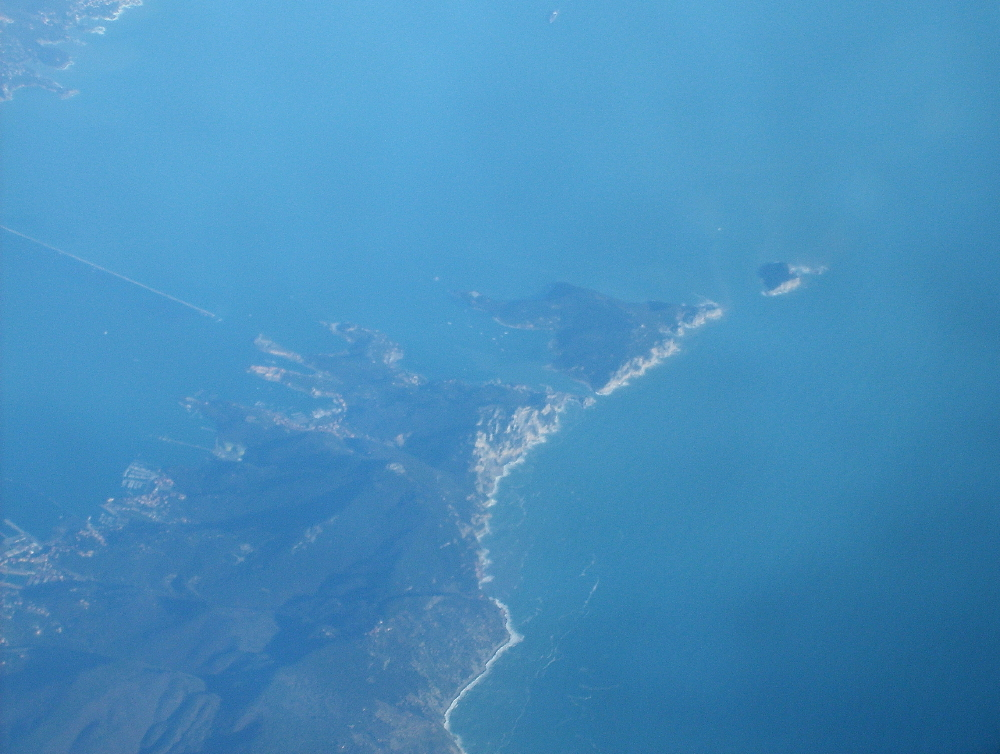
Islands of Palmaria and Tino

There are many species of reptile on the island, such as the smallest of the European geckos, the European leaf-toed gecko (Phyllodactylus europaeus). While also present on the neighboring islands of Tino and Tinetto, this species is rare in Liguria.

Bird species include kestrel (Falco tinnunculus), peregrine falcons (Falco peregrinus), sparrowhawks (Accipiter nisus), red partridges (Alectoris rufa), gulls (Larus argentatus, Larus michahellis), ravens (Corvus corax), rock thrushes (Monticola solitarius), and cormorants (Gulosus aristotelis).

Several species of bats are found in caves on Palmaria: the trunnion (Plecotus auritus), the greater horseshoe bat (Rhinolophus ferrumequinum), and the lesser horseshoe bat (Rhinolophus hipposideros).

Colonies of rabbits and goats on the island are remains of a recent past when the island was more inhabited.

The beetle Parmenas solieri is an endemic species linked to spurge patches found on the island.

== Climate and maritime links ==
The climate is typically Mediterranean, temperate on both daily and seasonal timescales.

In winter there are very few episodes of extreme cold or frost, while in summer the heat is moderated by the effect of the sea breeze. The abundant rainfall follows the trends of the Riviera di Levante, especially heavy in autumn and spring.

The island can be reached by private boat, or in the summer months by the ferries that connect with Portovenere, Lerici, and La Spezia.

== See also ==
- List of islands of Italy
- Scola Tower

== Gallery ==
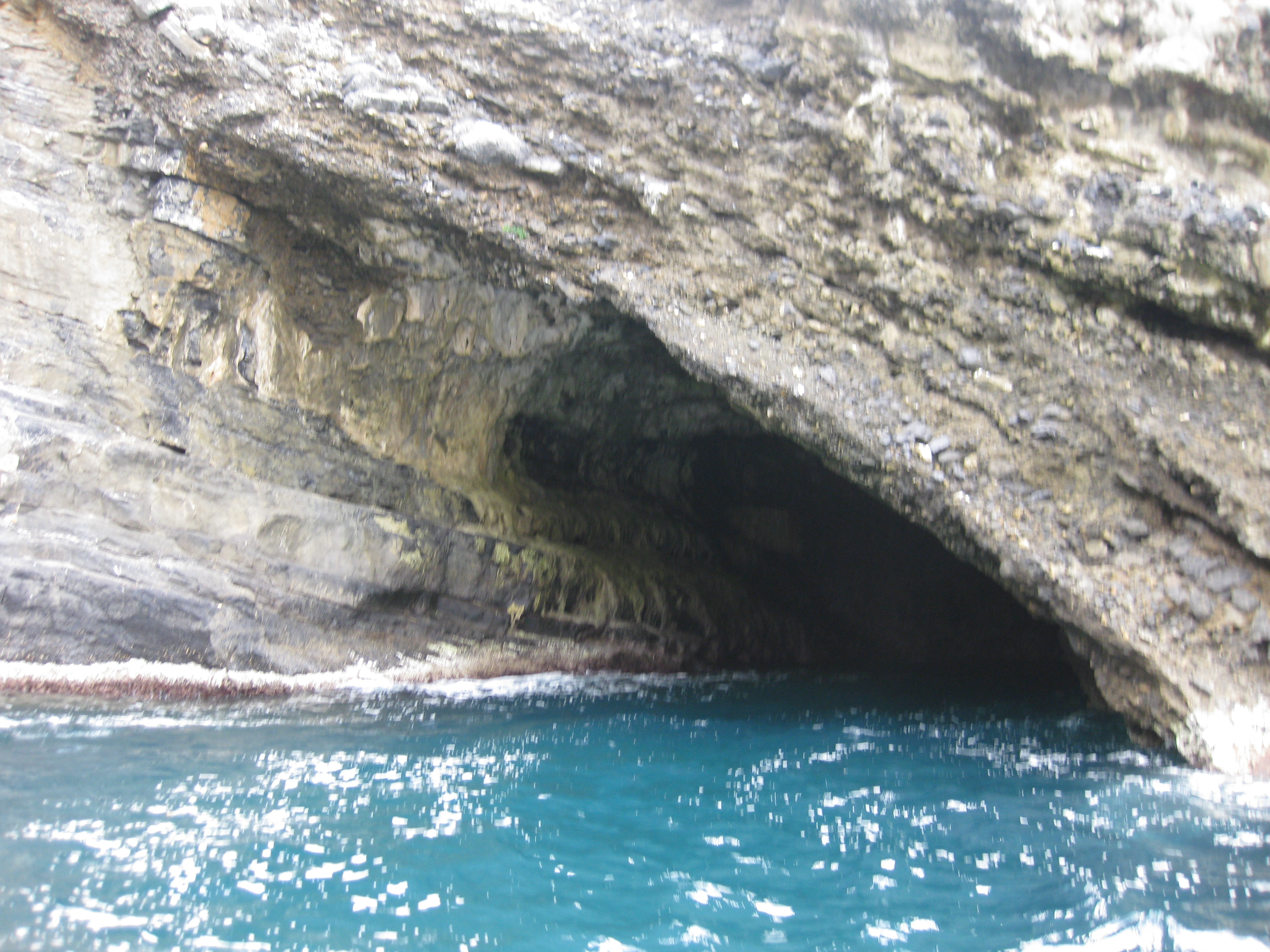
The Blue Cave

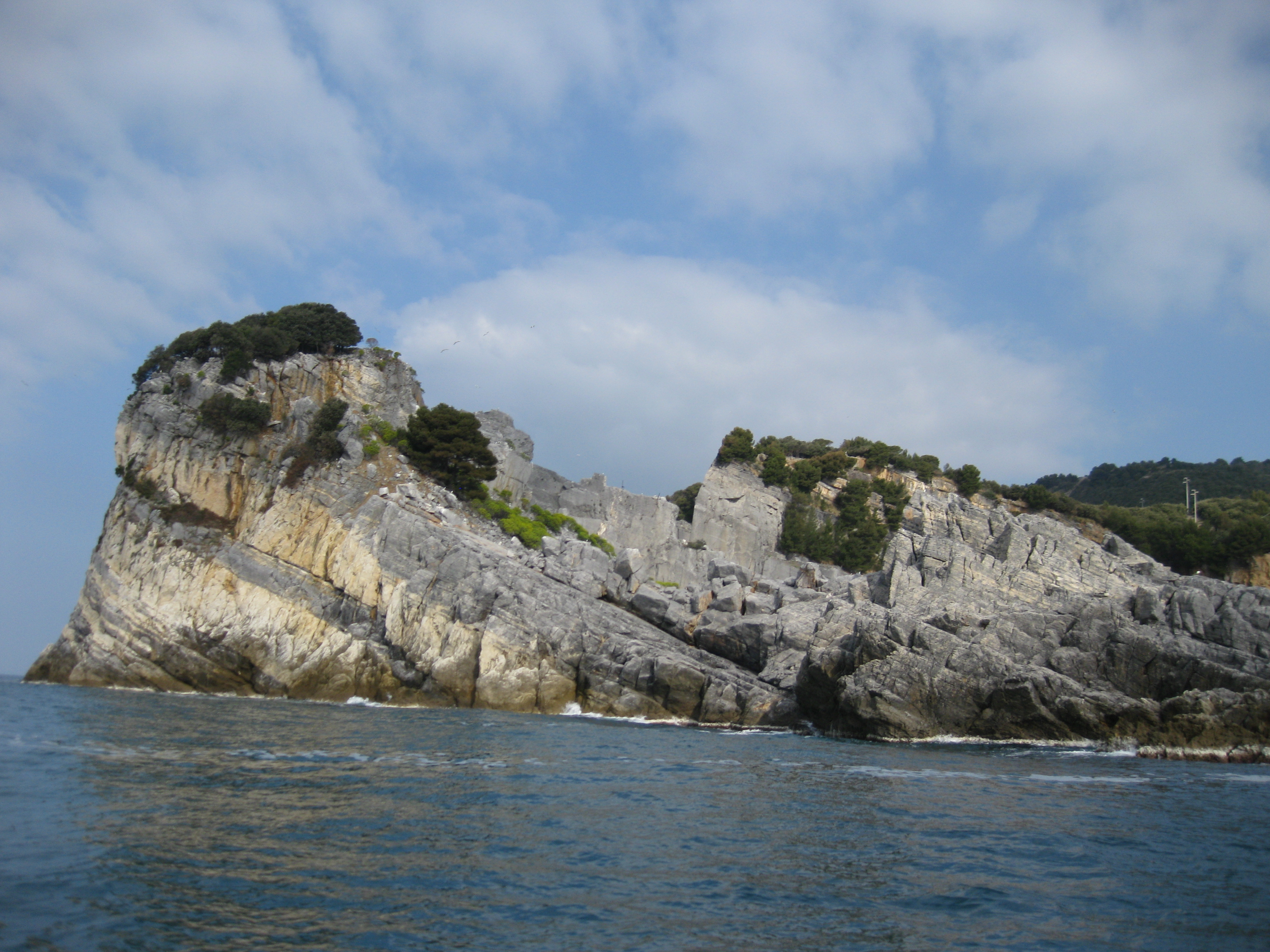
The rocky coast

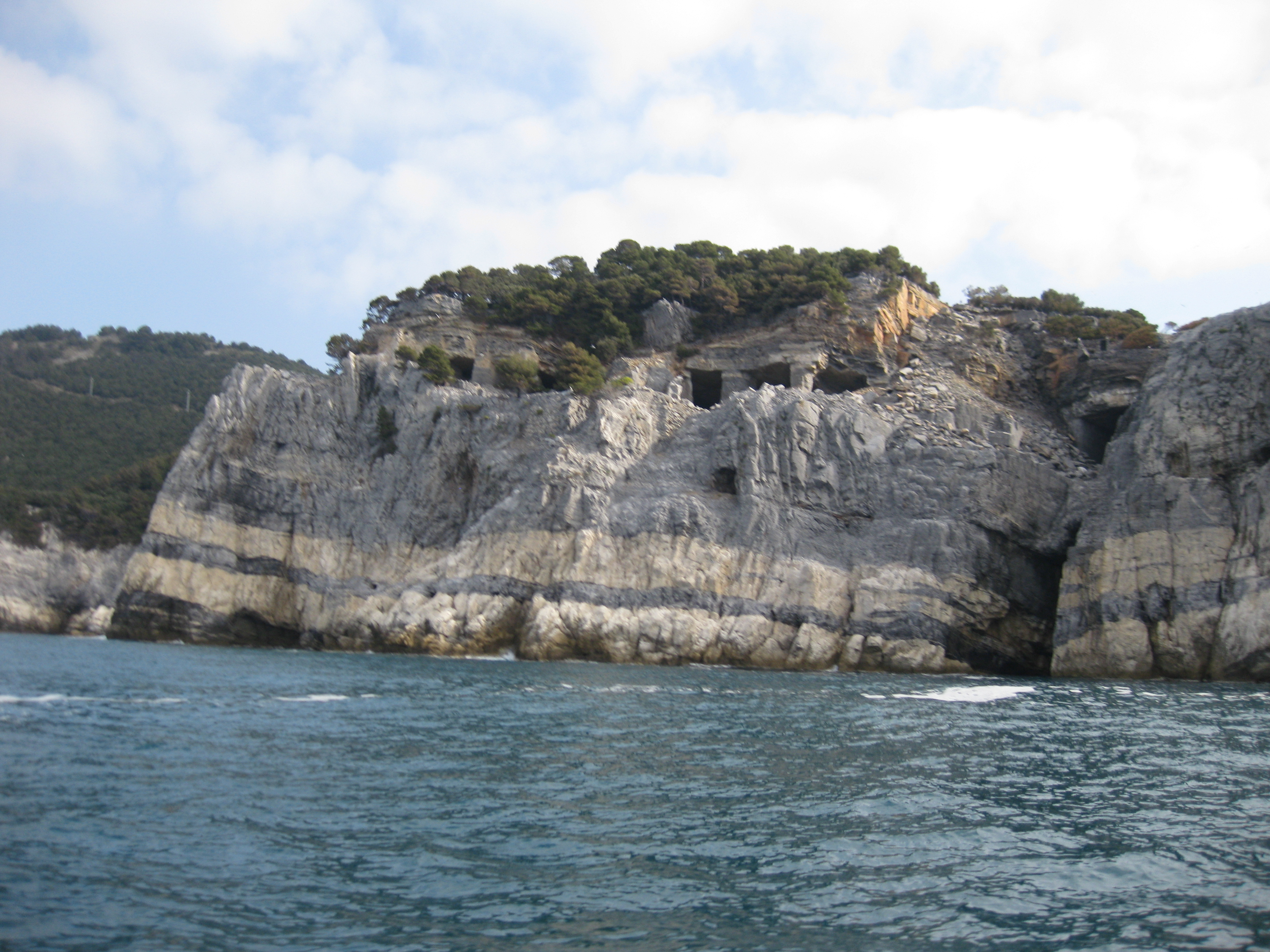
The marble caves

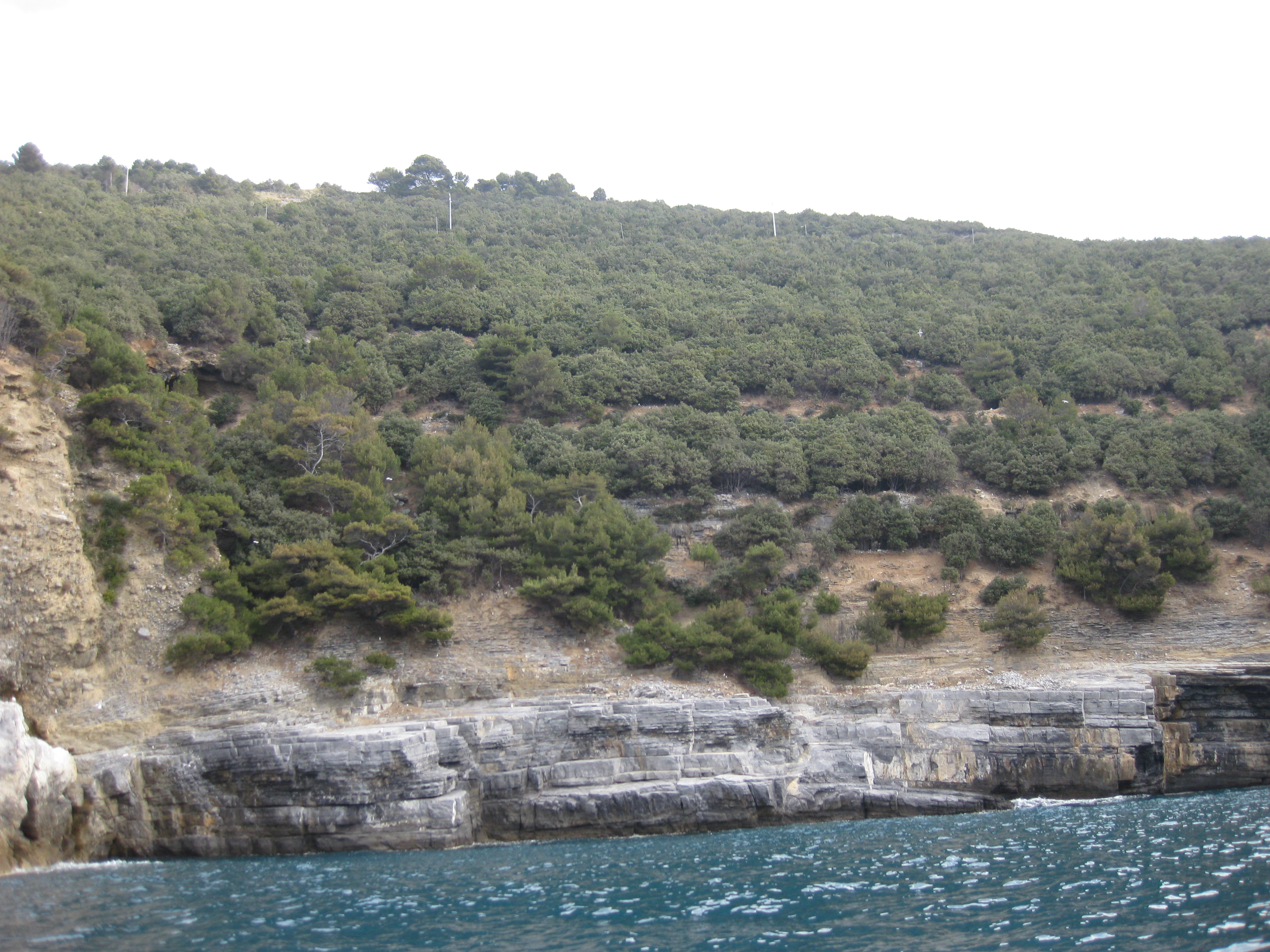
The vegetation

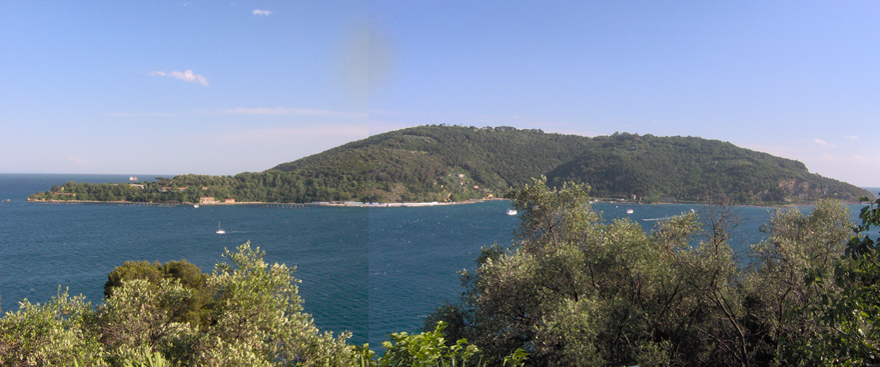
Palmaria Island, 2006
