= Porto Venere =

Porto Venere Pòrtivene (Ligurian)
- Comune
- Comune di Porto Venere
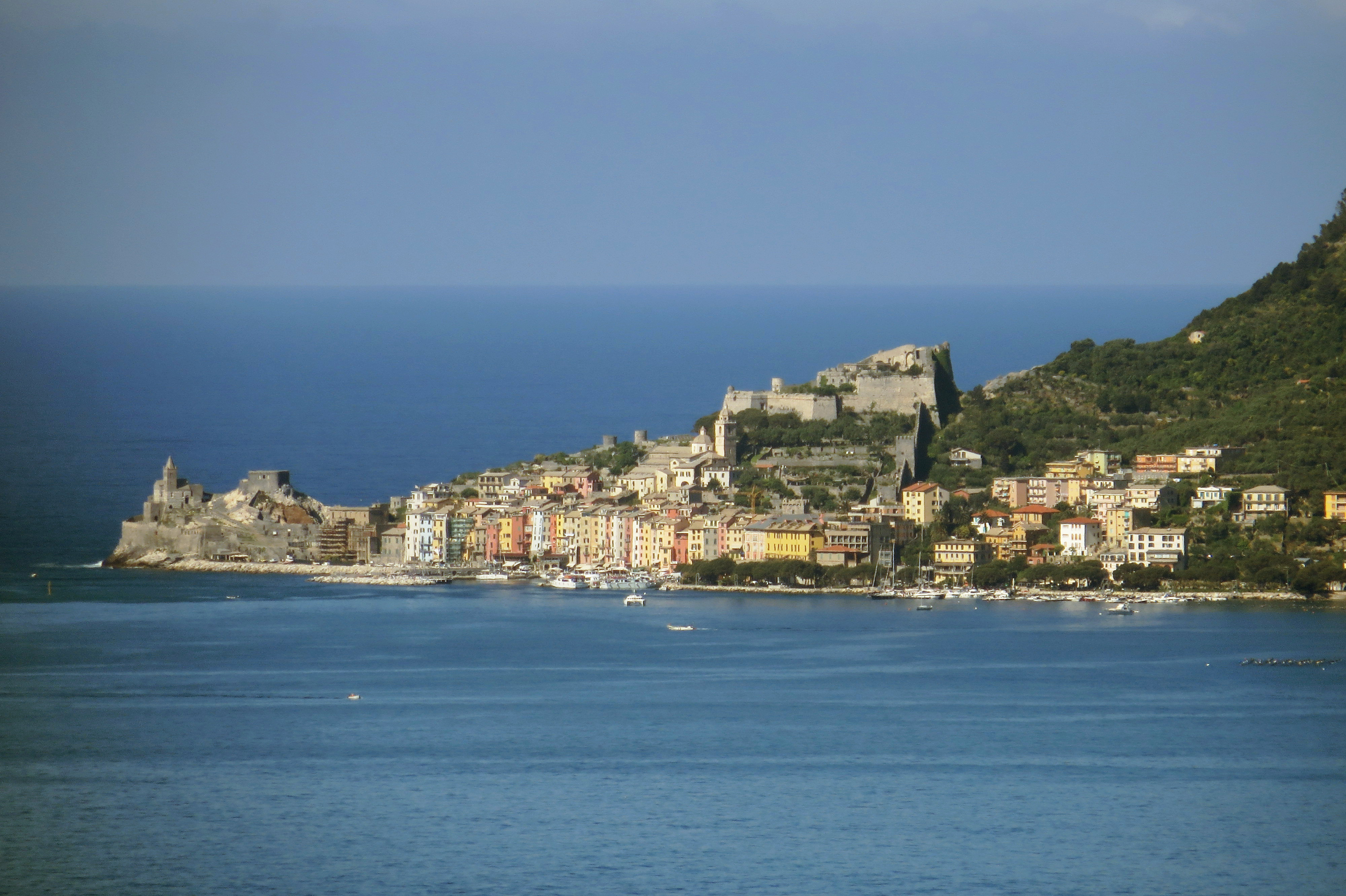
- Panoramic view from Lerici

- Coat of arms

- Location within Italy Location within Liguria
- Coordinates: 44°3′N 9°50′E
- Country: Italy
- Region: Liguria
- Province: La Spezia (SP)
- Frazioni: Le Grazie, Fezzano, Terrizzo

Government
  - Mayor: Matteo Cozzani

Area
  - Total: 7.66 km^{2} (2.96 sq mi)
- Elevation: 8 m (26 ft)

Population (2025)
  - Total: 3,208
  - Density: 419/km^{2} (1,080/sq mi)
- Demonym: Portoveneresi
- Time zone: UTC+1 (CET)
  - Summer (DST): UTC+2 (CEST)
- Postal code: 19025
- Dialing code: 0187
- Patron saint: The White Madonna
- Saint day: August 17
- Website: Official website

UNESCO World Heritage Site
- Part of: Cinque Terre and Portovenere part of Portovenere, Cinque Terre, and the Islands (Palmaria, Tino and Tinetto)
- Criteria: Cultural: (ii)(iv)(v)
- Reference: 826-001
- Inscription: 1997 (21st Session)

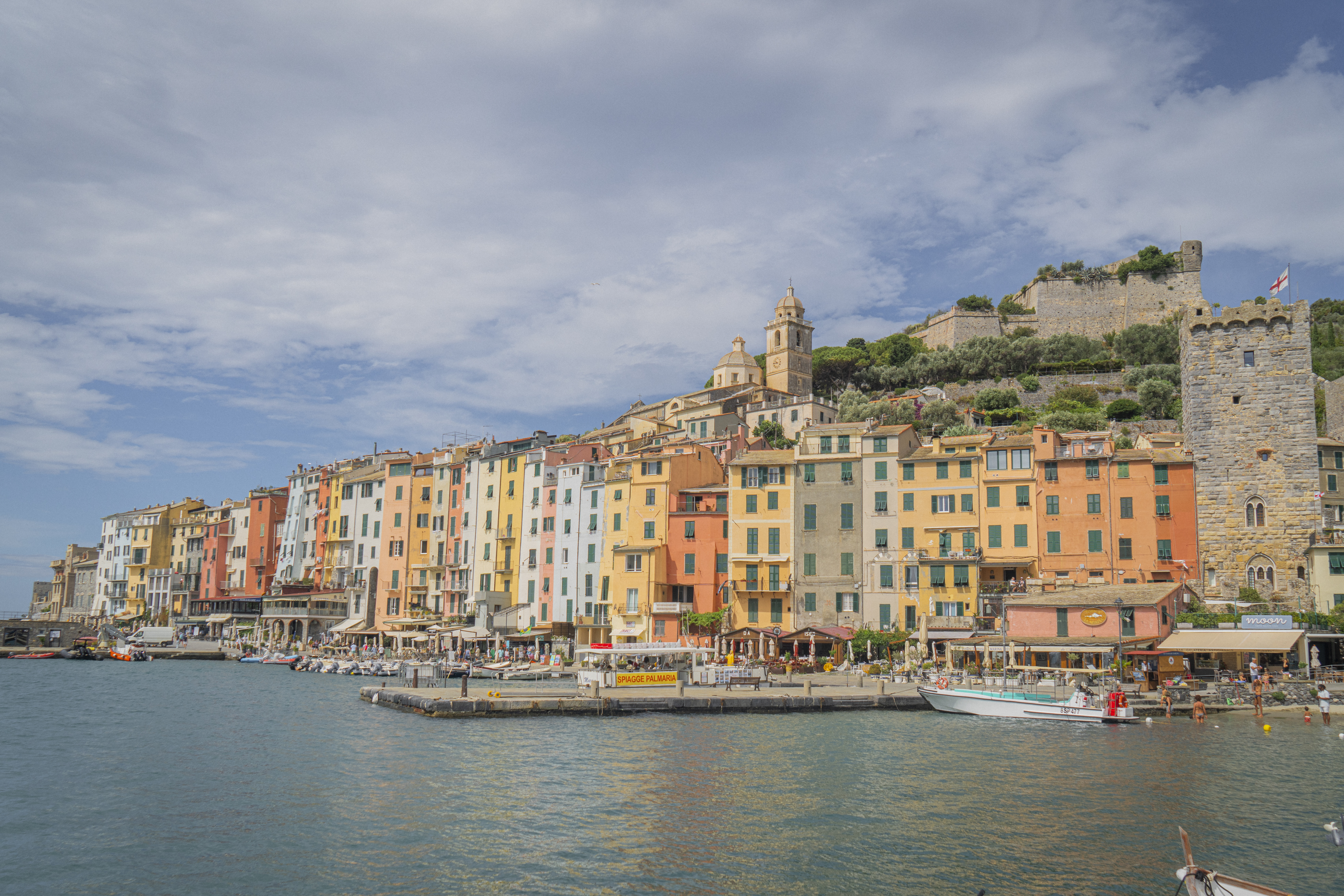
View of Porto Venere from the port

Porto Venere (Italian pronunciation: [ˈpɔrto ˈvɛːnere]; until 1991 Portovenere; Ligurian: Pòrtivene) is a town and municipality located on the Ligurian coast of Italy in the Province of La Spezia. It has a population of 3,208.

It comprises the three villages of Fezzano, Le Grazie and Porto Venere, and the three islands of Palmaria, Tino and Tinetto. In 1997 Porto Venere and the villages of Cinque Terre were designated by UNESCO as a World Heritage Site.

== History ==
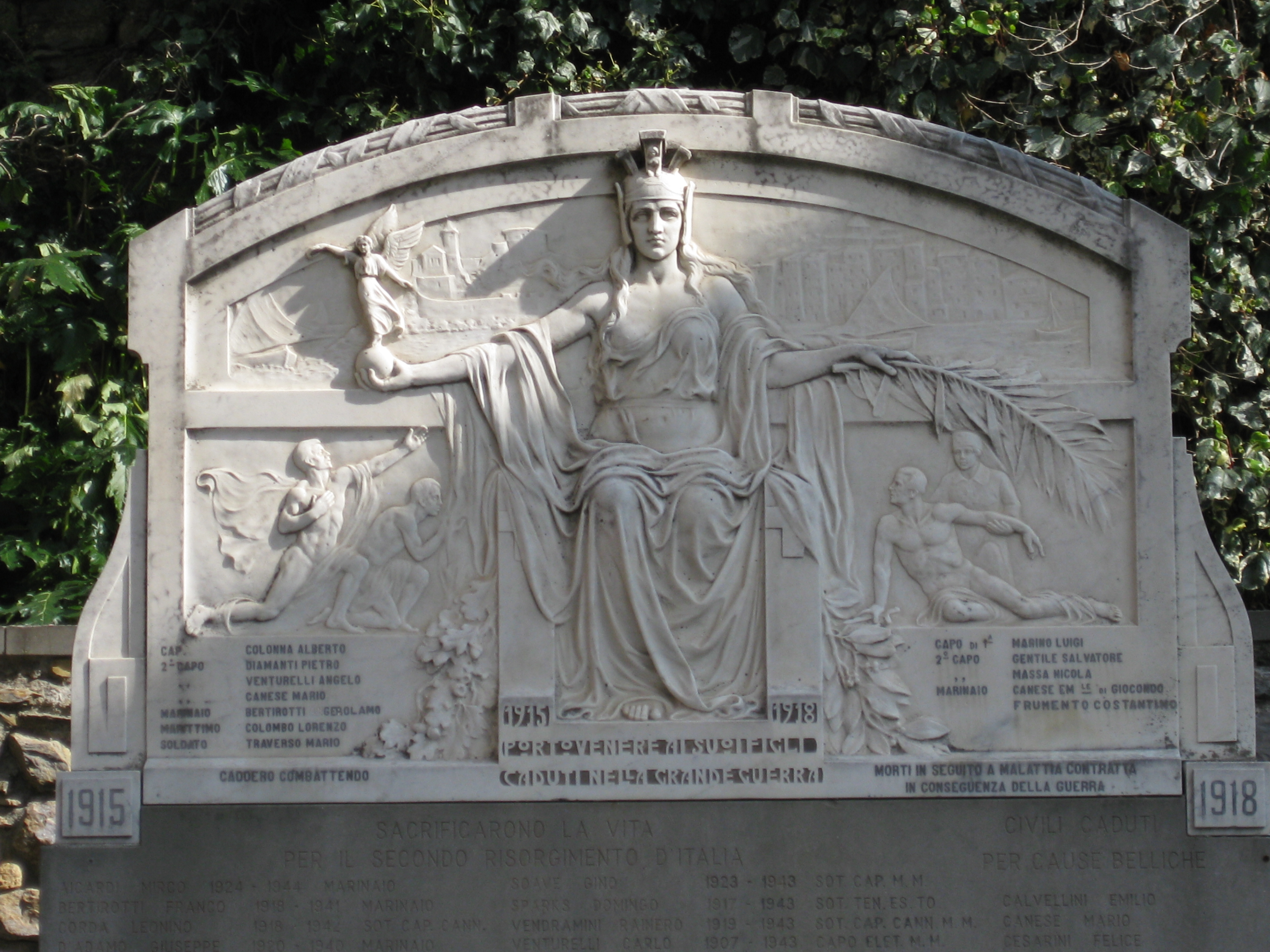
The War Memorial

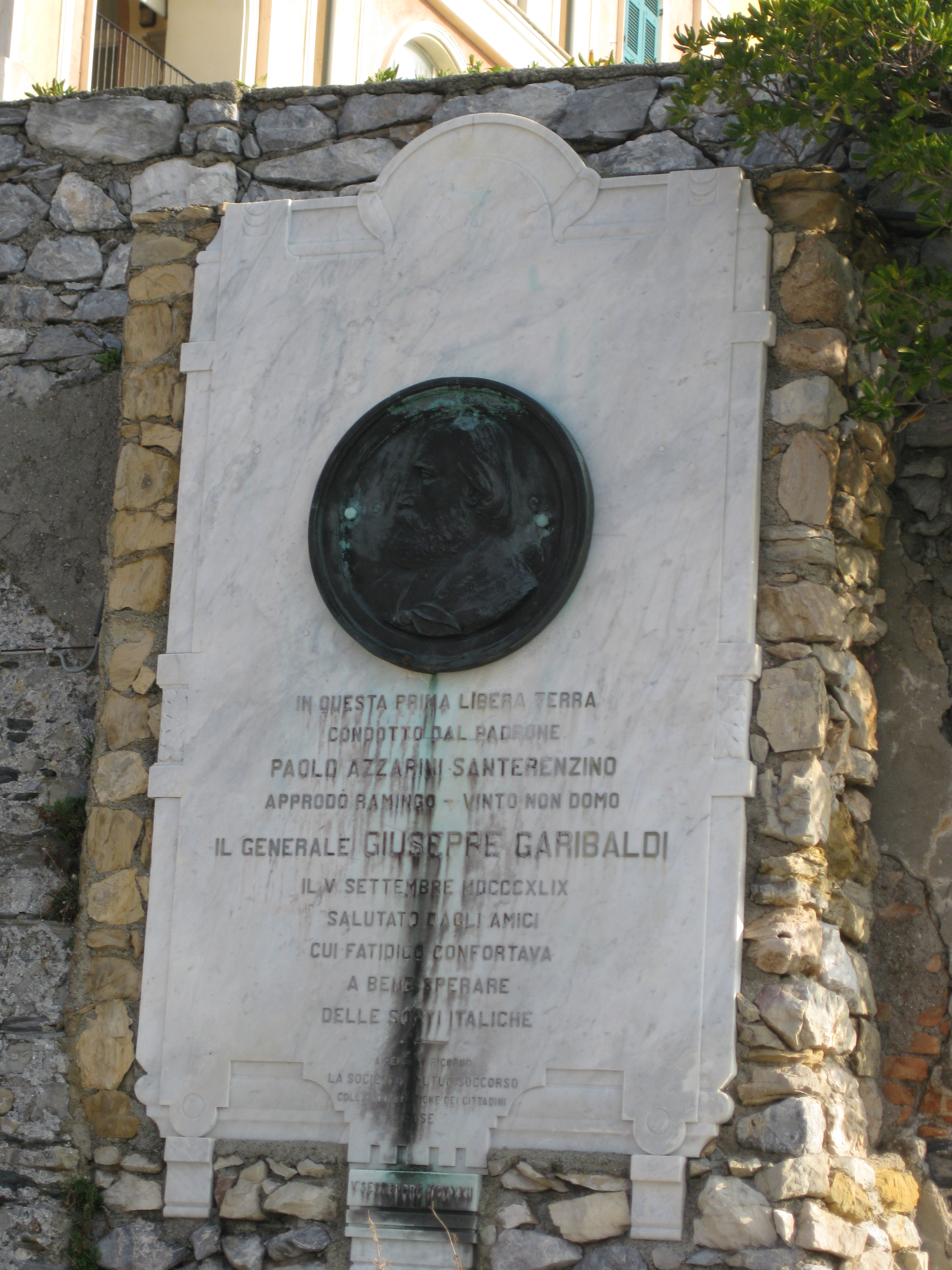
Plaque dedicated to Giuseppe Garibaldi

The ancient Portus Veneris is believed to date back to at least the middle of the 1st century BC. It has been said that the name refers to a temple to the goddess Venus which was sited on the promontory where the church of Peter the Apostle now stands. The name has also been linked to that of the hermit Saint Venerius. In Roman times the city was essentially a fishing community.

After the fall of the Western Roman Empire, Porto Venere became the base of the Byzantine fleet in the northern Tyrrhenian Sea, but was destroyed by the Lombards in 643 AD. Later, it was a frequent target of Saracen raids. First indications of the existence of a castle date from 1113, and in 1161 the walls were erected. Porto Venere became a fiefdom of a family from Vezzano before passing to Republic of Genoa in the early 12th century. In 1494, it suffered a devastating bombardment from the Aragonese fleet during their war with Genoa: subsequently the old part of the town declined in importance, giving way to the development of the Borgo Nuovo ("New District"), which had existed from 1139 and is centred on the church of St. Peter.

On 2 December 1797, after the French established their domination in Italy, the town became part of the Department of the Gulf of Venus, with the capital in La Spezia, in the Ligurian Republic annexed to the First French Empire. From 28 April 1798 with the new French law, the territory of Portovenere fell in the seventh canton, as the capital, the Jurisdiction of the Gulf of Venus since 1803 and the main center of the third State of the Gulf of Venus in the jurisdiction of the Gulf of Venus. From 13 June 1805 to 1814 it was included in the Department of the Apennines. It was at this point which, in 1812, it became part of the coastal route called "Route Napoleon" in honor of the French general and now known as localized road 530, which still connects the marine center with La Spezia via Fezzano, Le Grazie and Terizzo.

In 1815 it was incorporated in the Kingdom of Sardinia, according to the decisions of the Congress of Wien of 1814, and subsequently in the Kingdom of Italy from 1861. From 1859 to 1927 the territory was included in the First district of La Spezia, part of the Eastern District of the Province of Genoa before and, with its establishment in 1923, the Province of La Spezia.

In 1998 it obtained for its architectural heritage and natural entry in the list of protected World Heritage Site, with the Rolli in Genoa's historic center, one of only two Ligurian sites, and in 2001 established the eponymous Regional Natural Park.

== Coat of arms ==
The municipal Coat of arms was approved by the special decree of the Head of the Government dated 19 April 1933. In addition to the emblem and banner of the city is the cross of St. George to be also a symbol of civic and historical community of Porto Venere, including banner bearing its coat of arms (the color of Genoa are the flags of the three towers) and wants to emphasize the secular alliance of the village with the ancient Republic of Genoa. This "objective" is also mentioned in the municipal charter.

== Geography ==
The town lies at the southern end of a peninsula, which, breaking away from the jagged coastline of the Riviera di Levante, forming the western tip of the Gulf of La Spezia. At the end of this peninsula are three small islands: Palmaria, Tino and Tinetto; only Palmaria Island, which lies directly opposite the village of Porto Venere beyond a narrow strait, is partially inhabited.

It is bordered to the north by the municipality of La Spezia, and to the south, west and east by the Mediterranean Sea. It is about 3.2 kilometres (2 mi) south of La Spezia and 72 kilometres (45 mi) southeast of Genoa.

There is a conveyor system with the sewer grates and pumps that push the waste into a subsea pipeline that comes out to about 200 metres (660 ft) beyond the toe of St. Peter. The strong current and high depth of discharge, about 35 metres (115 ft), contribute to the rapid dispersion of the fluid.

The beaches of the area are a tourist attraction.

=== Climate ===
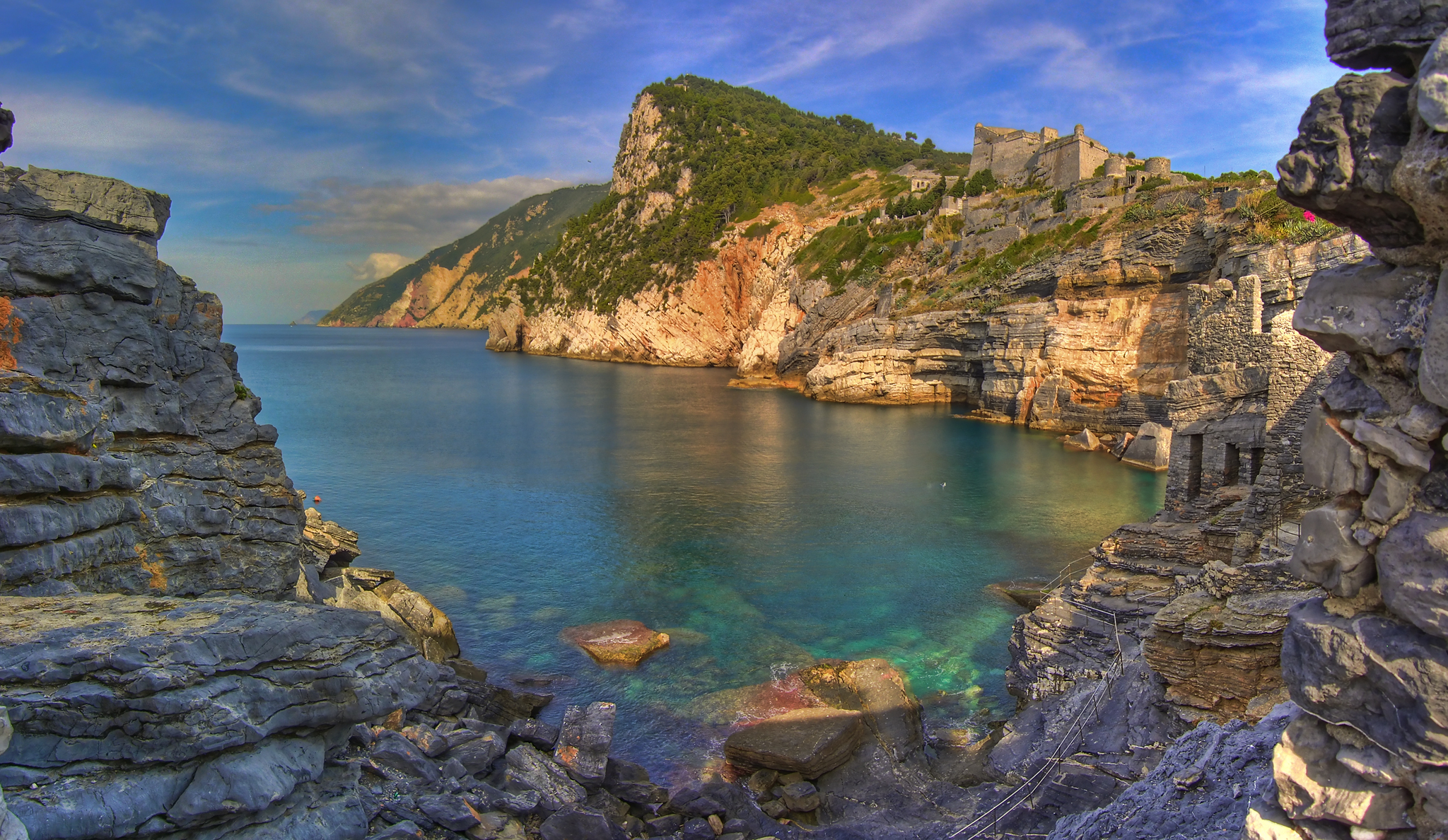
Byron's Grotto, so named because the poet Lord Byron used to meditate there

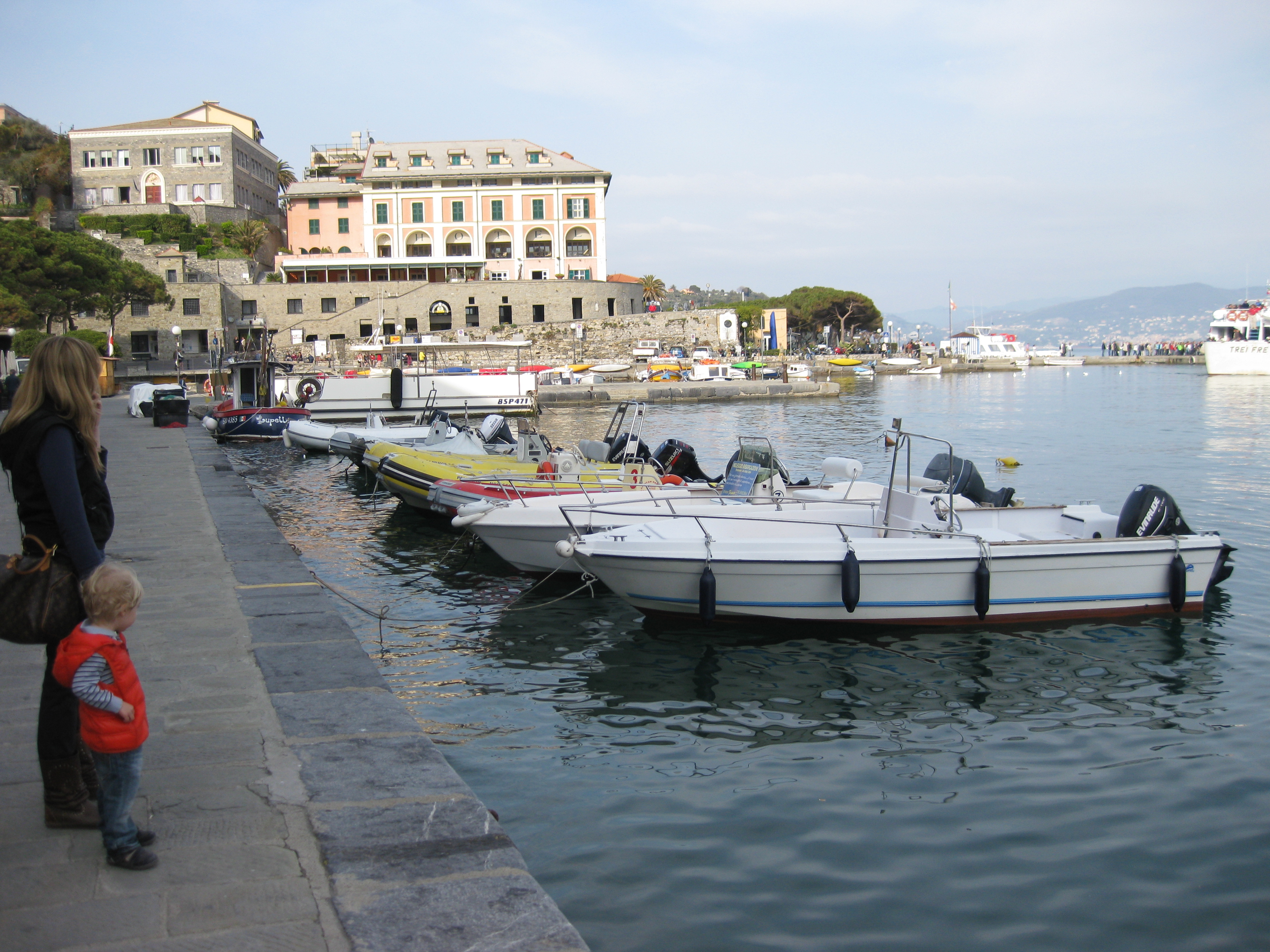
The Marina

The climate is typically Mediterranean, with almost no excess heat in summer and no freezing in winter. However, rainfall can be abundant, especially in autumn and spring, due to the orography of the Riviera di Levante. In the municipal area, the weather station is located on Island of Palmaria, where data can be considered similar to those occurring in Porto Venere and the surrounding areas. The area of Portovenere-Palmaria Island is the only point behind in the Ligurian Sea between the Isle of Elba and the islands of Hyères, France. Hence the strategic role in the history of seafaring.

== Demographics ==
As of 2025, Porto Venere has a population of 3,208, of whom 50.2% are male and 49.8% are female. Minors make up 8.9% of the population, and seniors make up 35.8%, compared to the Italian average of 14.9% and 24.7% respectively.

Historical population

Year	Pop.	±%
1861	3,733	—
1871	3,439	−7.9%
1881	3,567	+3.7%
1901	5,754	+61.3%
1911	5,624	−2.3%
1921	6,028	+7.2%
1931	6,968	+15.6%
1936	5,592	−19.7%

Year	Pop.	±%
1951	6,057	+8.3%
1961	5,335	−11.9%
1971	5,187	−2.8%
1981	4,781	−7.8%
1991	4,534	−5.2%
2001	4,097	−9.6%
2011	3,702	−9.6%
2021	3,310	−10.6%

Source: ISTAT

== Economy ==
In the municipality of Porto Venere, in Panigaglia, into the Gulf of Spezia, there is a regasification plant, thanks to which it can import by sea, in the liquid state, natural hydrocarbon gas, such as liquified natural gas. Portovenere's economy focuses on tourism. Hotels, bed and breakfasts, guest houses, and residences have become more important in recent years. The popular shopping promenade in the Doria quay and the picturesque Alley and panoramic views to the church of St. Peter and the Doria Castle. The harbor of Portovenere, although the smallest of Liguria, is always sold out in the summer season and also hosts many celebrities.

== Sights ==
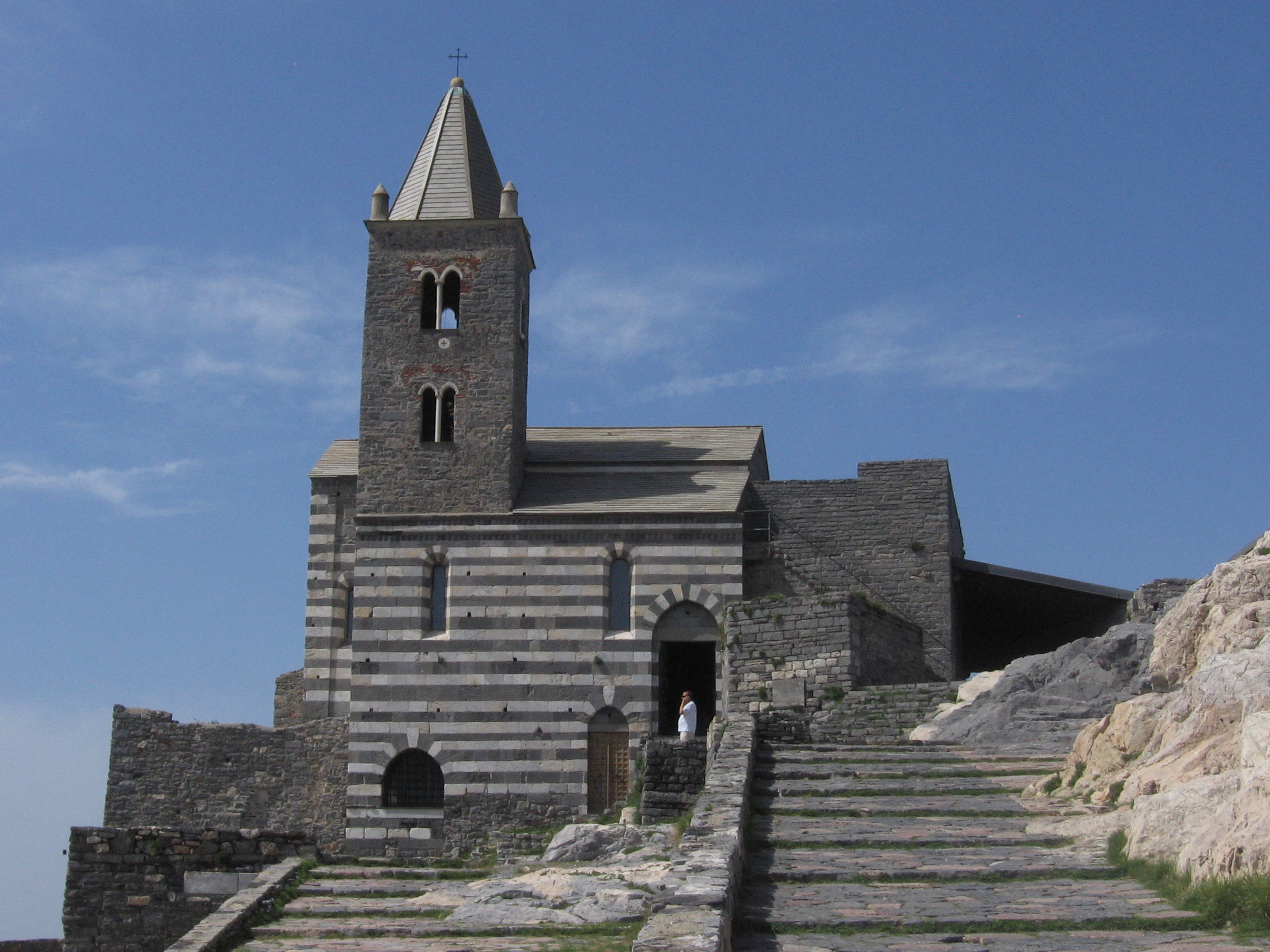
Church of St. Peter

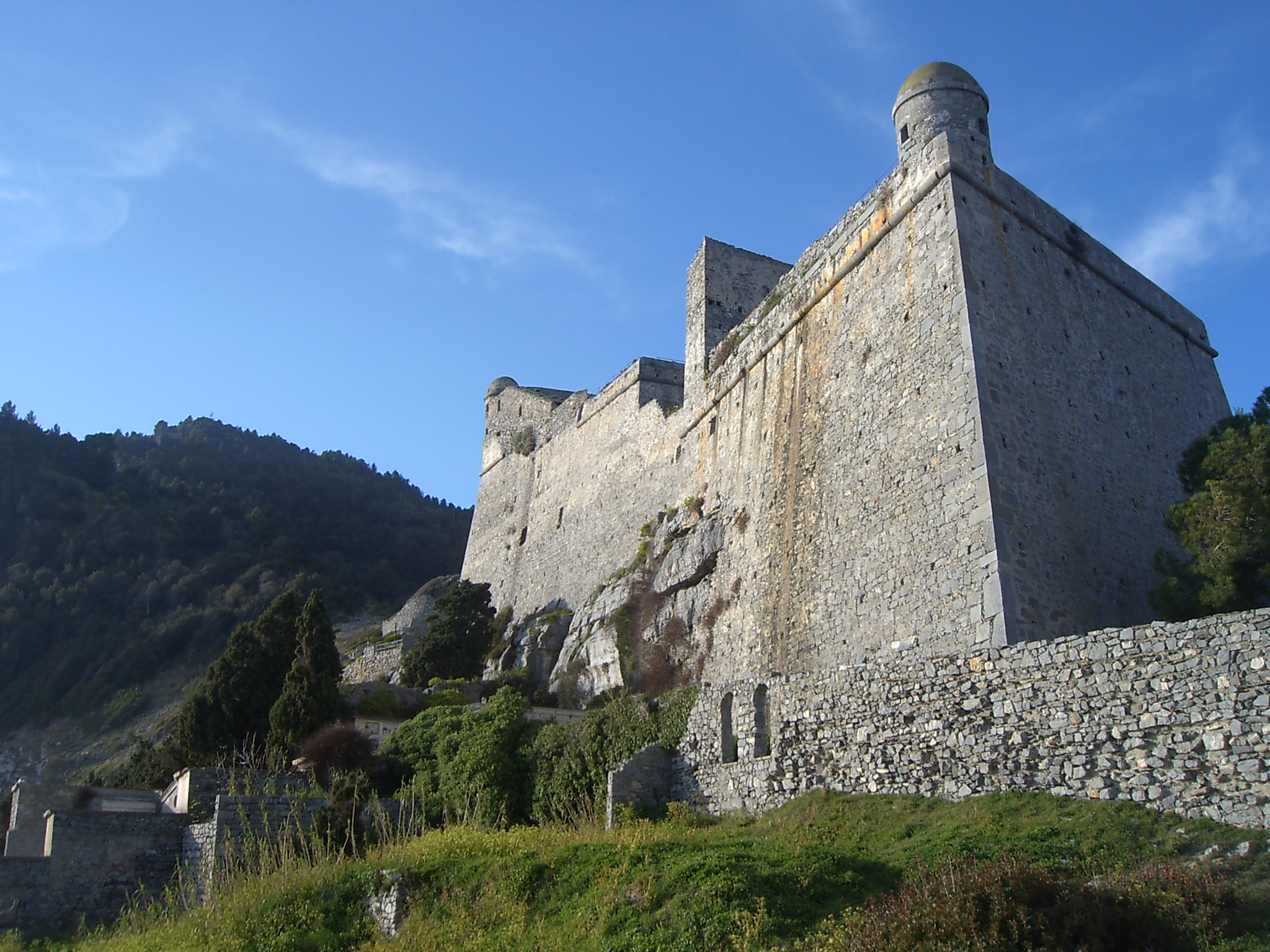
Doria Castle

- The Church of St. Peter consecrated in 1198. It was built over a pre-existing 5th-century Palaeo-Christian church, which had rectangular plan and semicircular apse. The new part, from the 13th century, is marked externally by white and black stripes.
- The Romanesque church of Saint Lorence, also called the Sanctuary of the White Virgin (in Italian: Santuario della Madonna Bianca) was erected in 1098 by the Genoese. It is probably occupies the site of ancient temple dedicated to Jupiter and is the work of the Antelami Magisters, originary of the Valle d'Intelvi, in the Province of Como. The church was damaged by a fire in 1340 and by the Aragonese attack in 1494, and was further restored in 1582.
- The Doria Castle, an example of Genoese military architecture. The castle has changed over the centuries in response to developments in military technology. The castle consists of two parts, a 15th Century upper section and a later (post-cannon) lower section. The lower section contains the Sala Ipostila, a hall built on the site of ancient Greek temples. The upper section contains the Casa del Catellano, the home of the commander of the castle and sits above the Sala Ipostila. During the Napoleonic period after 1807, the Castle saw service as a political prison.
- The Grotta dell'Arpaia (now collapsed), known as Byron's Grotto, from which the English poet Byron swam across the gulf of La Spezia to San Terenzo to visit Shelley in Lerici, in 1822.
- The medieval nucleus of Le Grazie is set around the 14th-century Church of Our Lady of the Graces; nearby is a medieval convent which once belonged to the Olivetans and the remains of the 1st century BCE Roman villa of Varignano. Finds from recent excavations at the villa are held in the Antiquarium della Villa Romana del Varignano in Porto Venere.
- In Fezzano the medieval alleyways are noteworthy, along with the church of St. John the Baptist (1740) and the recently restored Villa Cattaneo.

=== Natural areas ===
Natural places in Porto Venere include the famous sea caves Byron (Cala dell'Arpaia), Azzurra or Blue Cave (semi-submerged) and Tinetto; the cavity of the Doves and the wall of Tino, the shoal of Dante and Small and Big creeks. Byron's cave, named after Lord Byron, who found inspiration and meditation for his literary works here. It is located at the spur of rock below the church of St. Peter and the old defensive position, the marine cave has a minimum depth of five meters and a maximum of twenty along the side.

=== Regional Natural Park ===
The Regional Natural Park in Portovenere has high coasts, caves and vegetation. To crown the Park archipelago with three islands of Palmaria, Tino and Tinetto. Guglielmo Marconi experimented in front of the village for his innovative studies.

== Events ==
- Porto Venere is one of the maritime villages that participate each year in Palio of Gulf.
- Traditional procession of the White Madonna along the streets of the village set up in celebration and evocative Roman torches lighting the headland of Punta di San Pietro, the icon of the Virgin Mary (17 August 1399) is carried in procession through the streets of village. The procession of the "White Madonna" brings hundred of tourists every August.
- Feast of St. Venerius (patron of the Gulf of Spezia and lighthouse keepers of Italy) on 13 September on the island of Tino.
- Feast of the Basil of Caesarea, is celebrated every year on 9 April.
- The market is held every Monday morning in the center of the town.

== In popular culture ==
The 2021 Pixar animated film Luca was primarily based on the Cinque Terre towns, however the animation team visited Porto Venere as well for inspiration.

== Notable people ==
- Simonetta Vespucci (ca. 1453 – 26 April 1476), the Renaissance muse of Botticelli
- Lord Byron (1788–1824), poet and diplomat
- Gino Montefinale (1881–1974), admiral, writer and artist
