= Gulf of La Spezia =

Body of water in La Spezia, Italy

Coordinates: 44.0639°N 9.8833°E

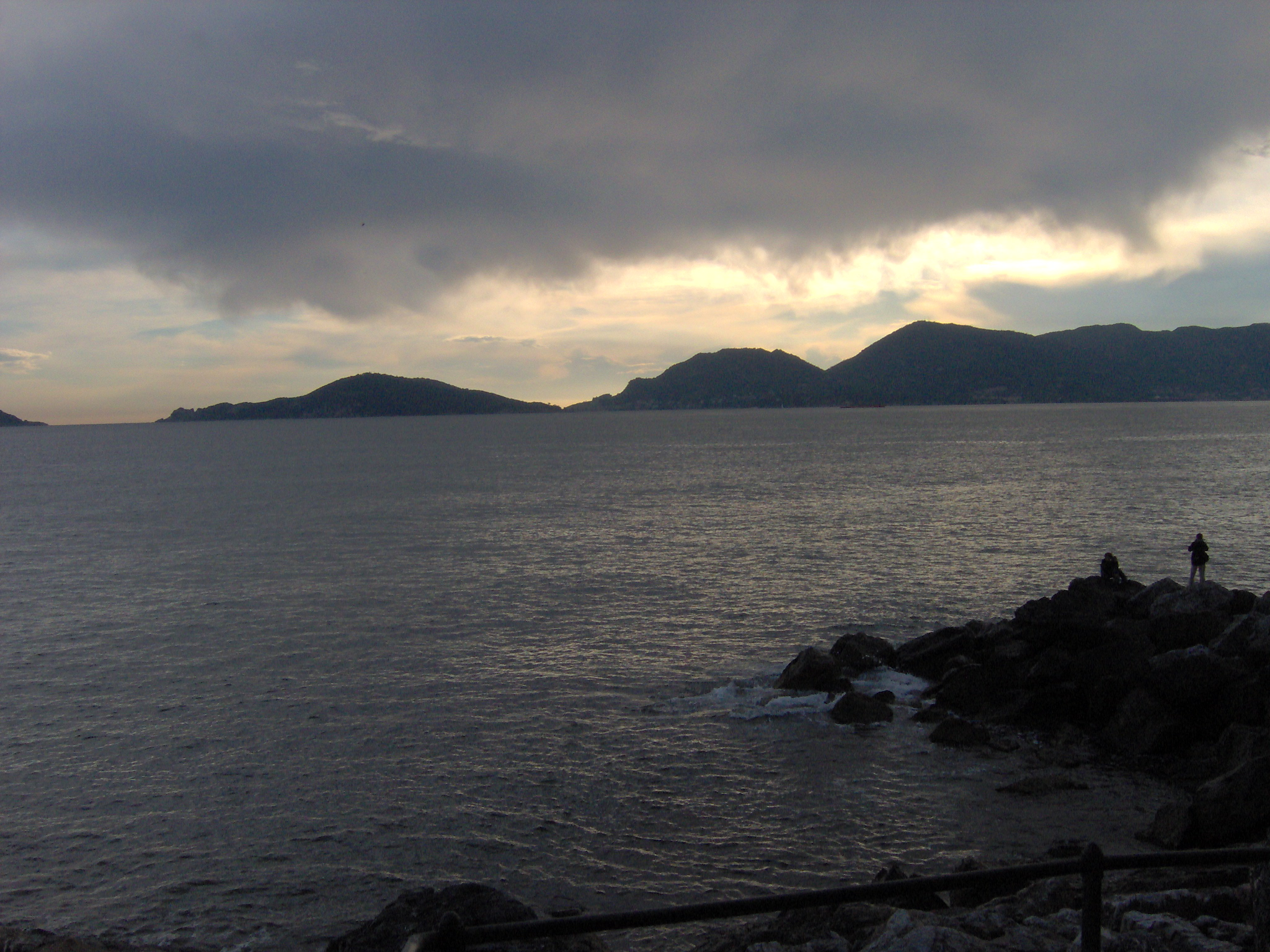
The gulf seen from Tellaro.

The Gulf of La Spezia (Italian: Golfo della Spezia; Ligurian: Gorfo da Spezza), nicknamed the Gulf of Poets (Italian: Golfo dei Poeti; Ligurian: Gorfo di Poêti), is a body of water on the north-western coast of Italy and part of the northern Tyrrhenian Sea, specifically of Ligurian Sea. It measures some 4.5 (length) by 3-3.5 (width) kilometers.

The gulf is named for the Italian city of La Spezia, located at its middle point, which is also the main military and cargo port in the gulf, including several arsenals of the Italian Marina Militare. At the gulf extremities are the two tourist resorts of Lerici (eastern) and Porto Venere (western).

Islands in the gulf include Palmaria, Tino, and Tinetto.

The British poet and dramatist Percy Bysshe Shelley drowned in the Gulf in 1822 when the sailing boat he was on, the Don Juan, sank due to a severe storm. A copy of poems by fellow British Romantic writer John Keats was found in his pocket when his body was recovered from the Gulf.

== Sources ==
- Carey, John (2020). A Little History of Poetry. New Haven and London: Yale University Press. p. 123. ISBN 978-0-300-23222-6.
- Pucciarelli, Mauro (1986). Il Golfo dei Poeti.
