= Italian Riviera =

Italian Riviera Rivêa lìgure (Ligurian) Riviera ligure (Italian) Ligurian Riviera
- Riviera
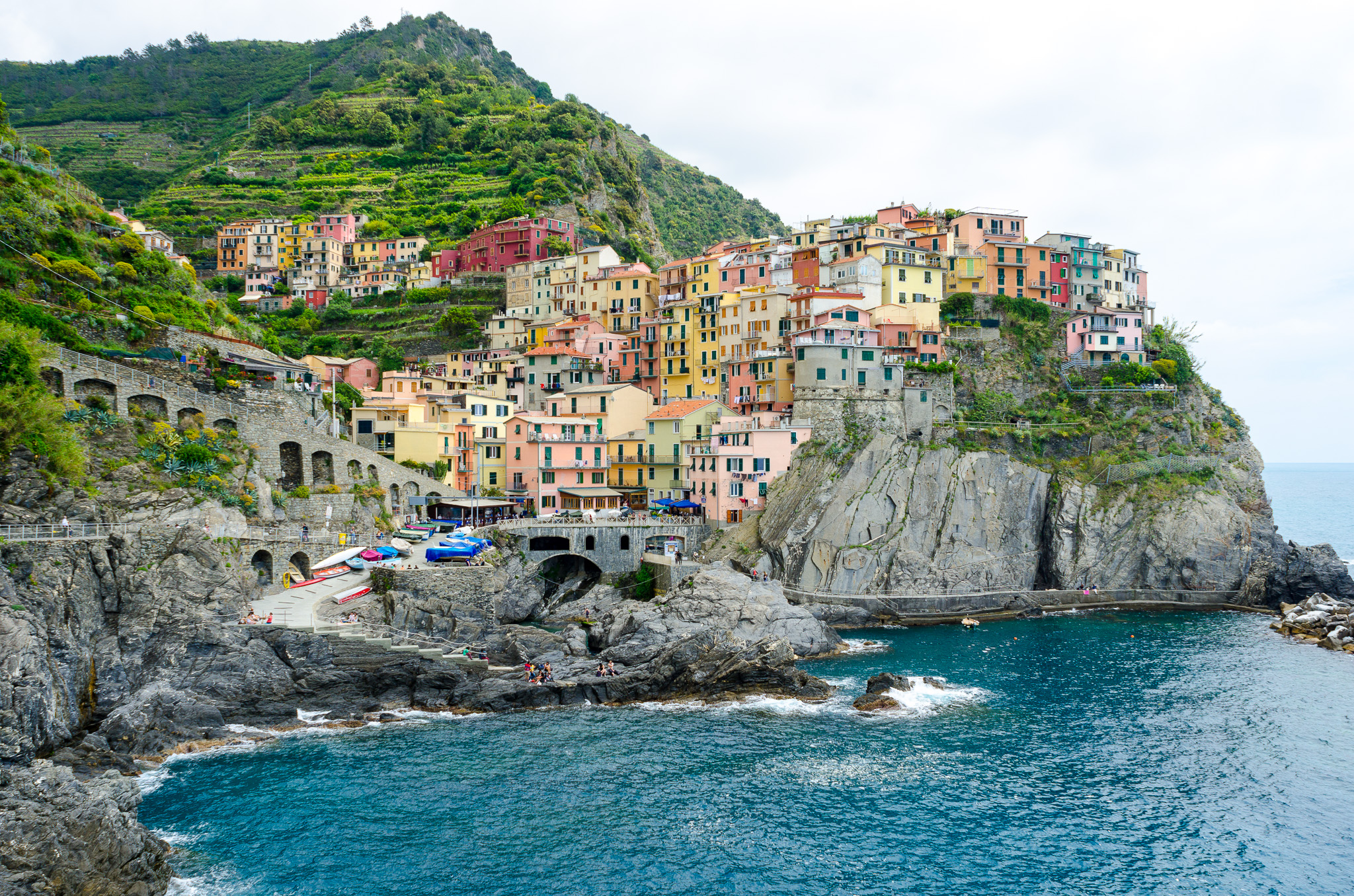
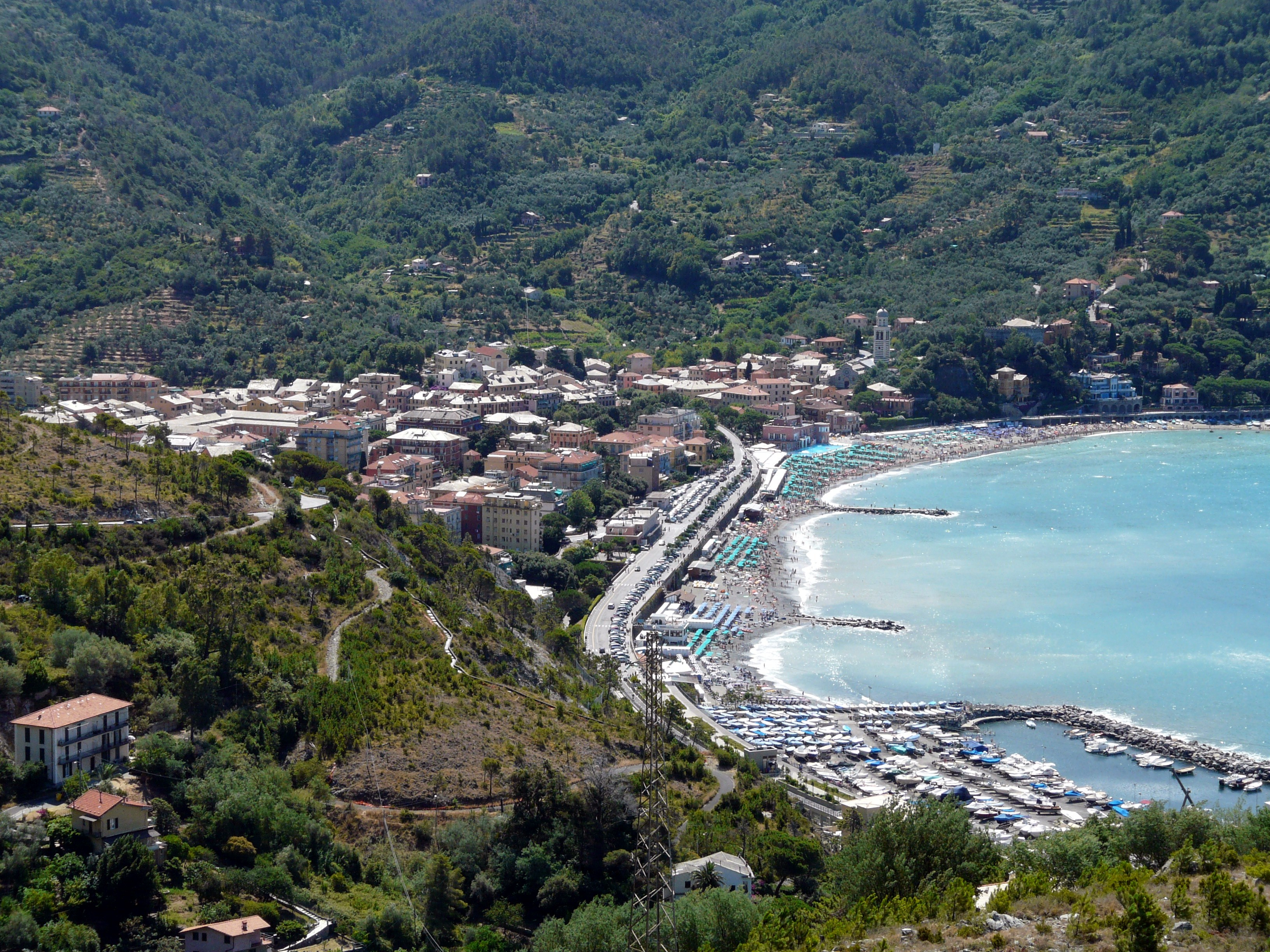
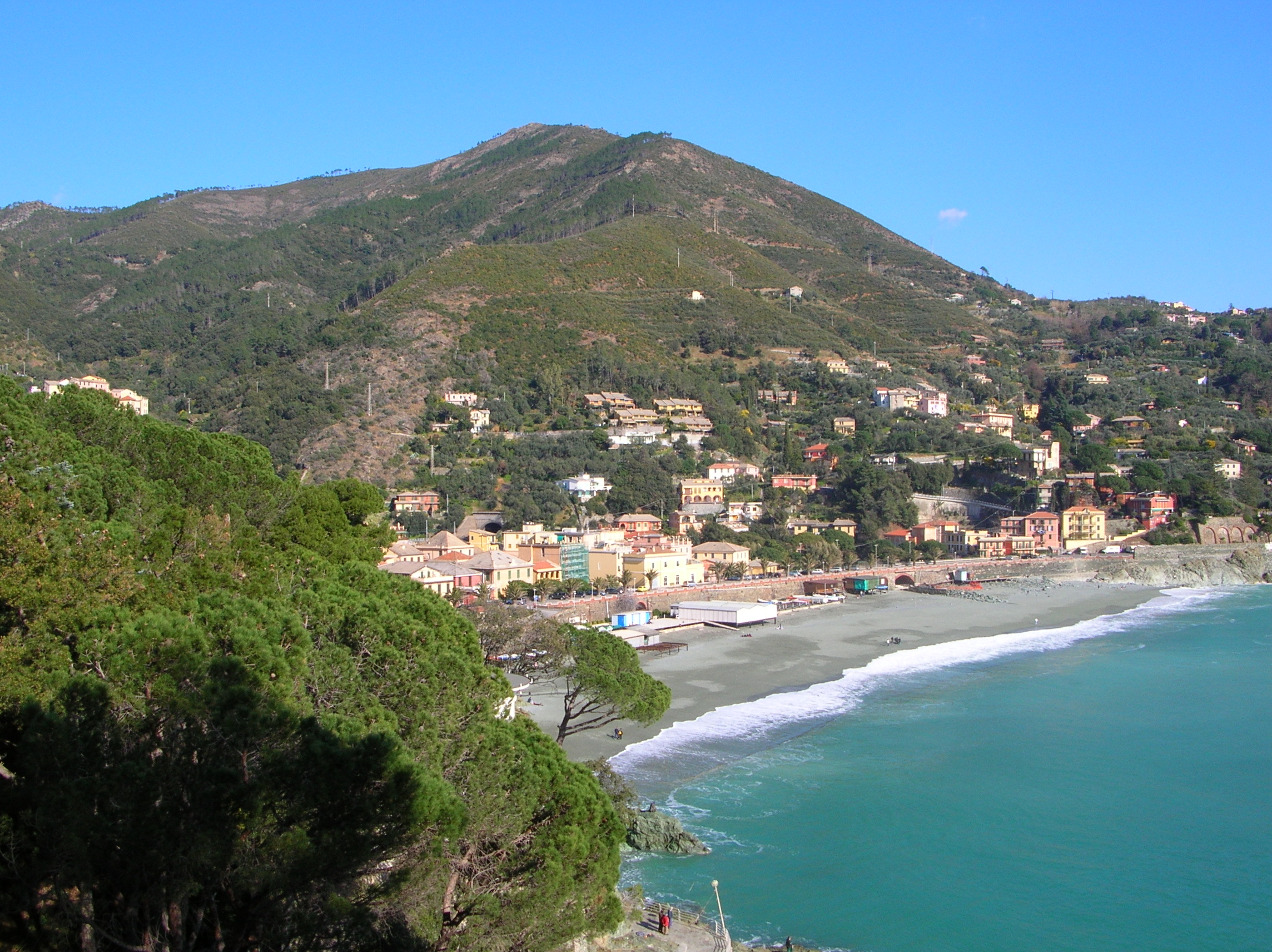
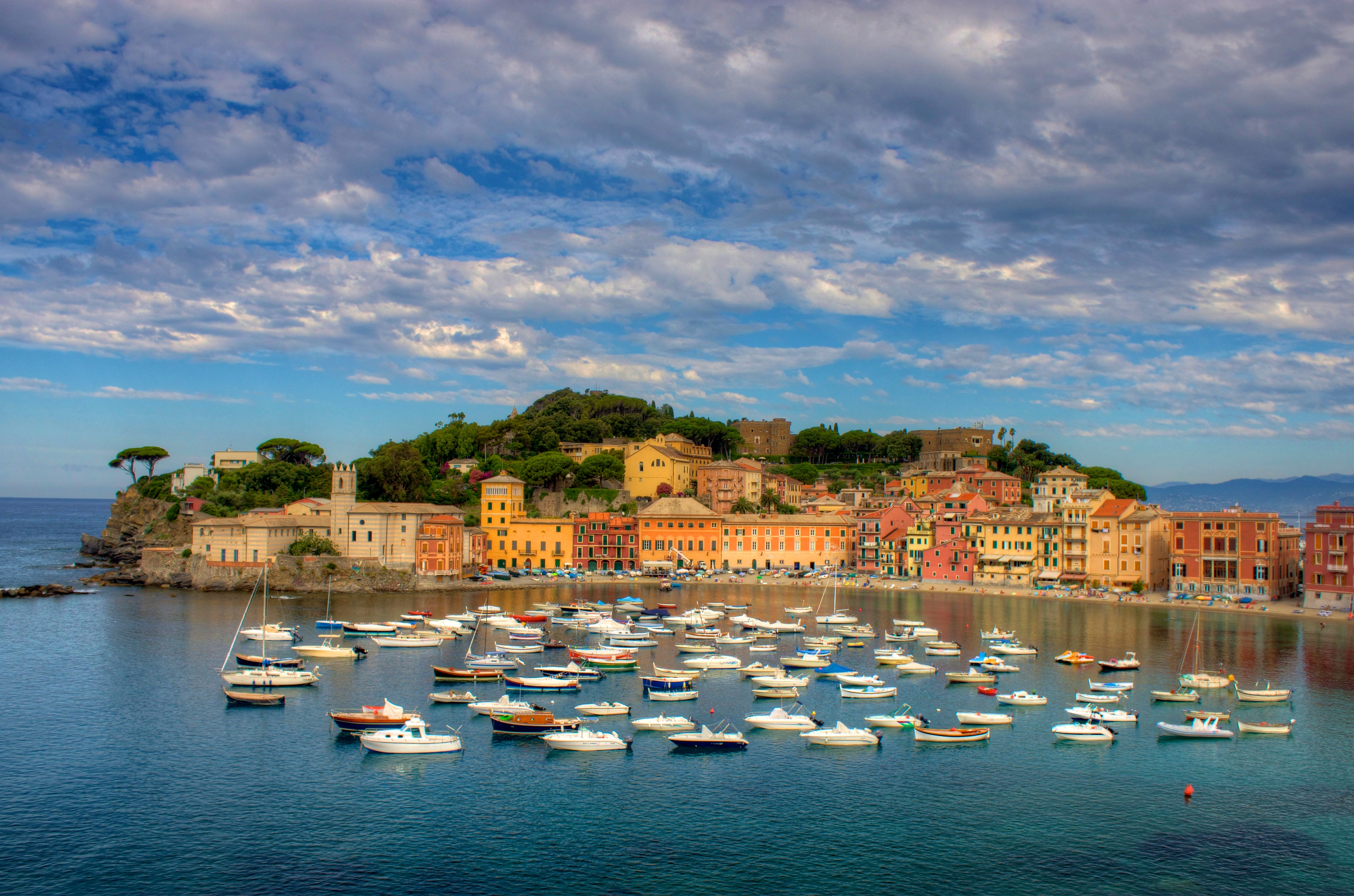
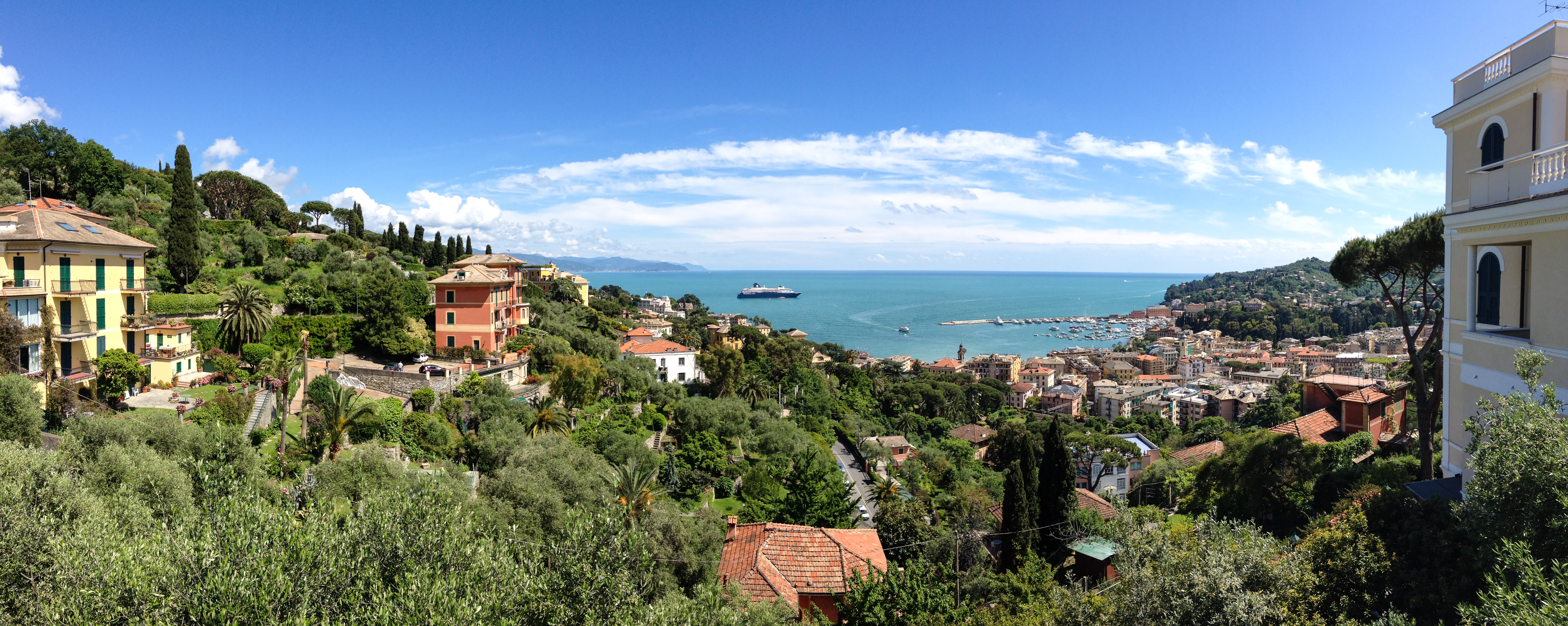
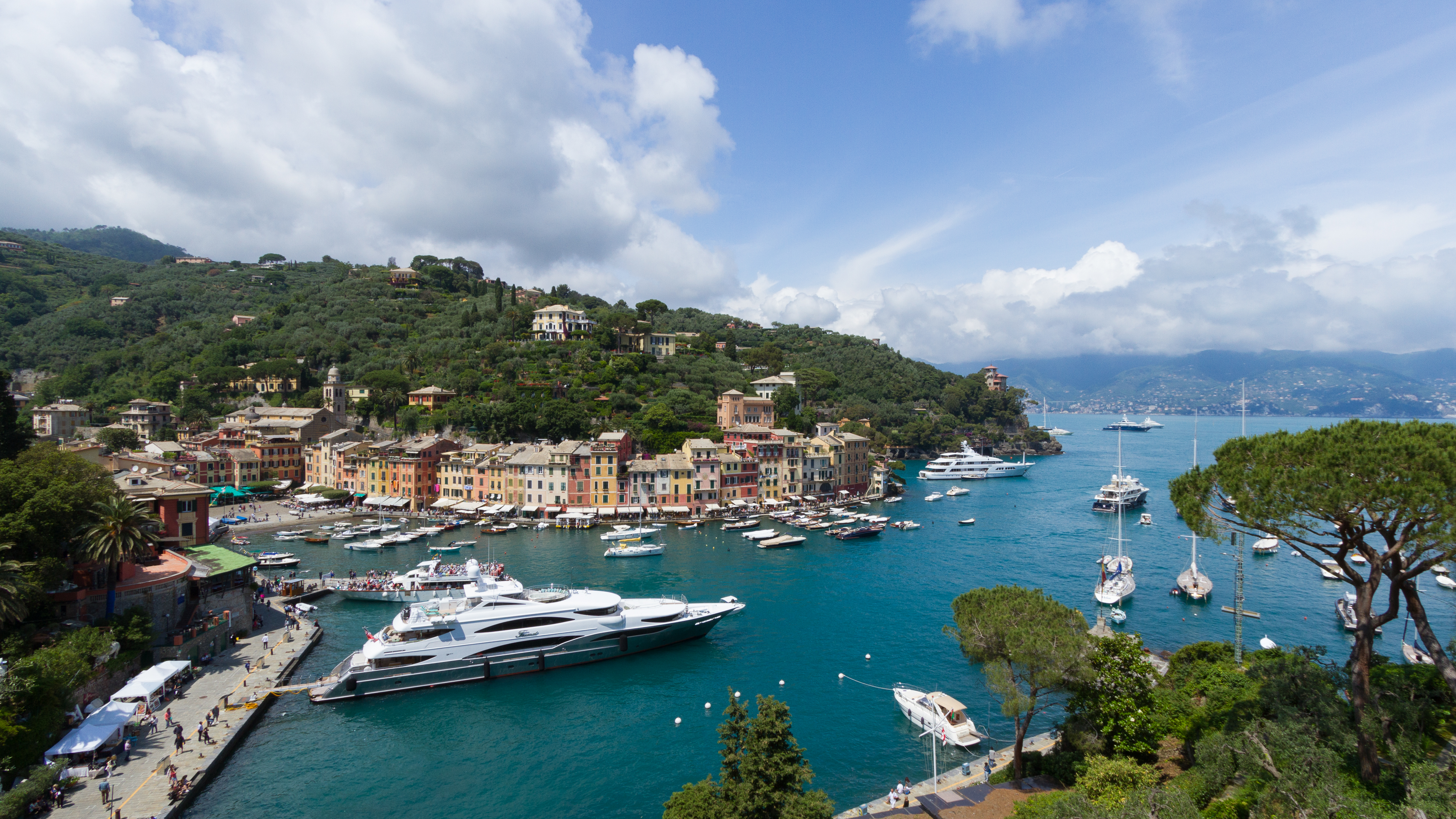
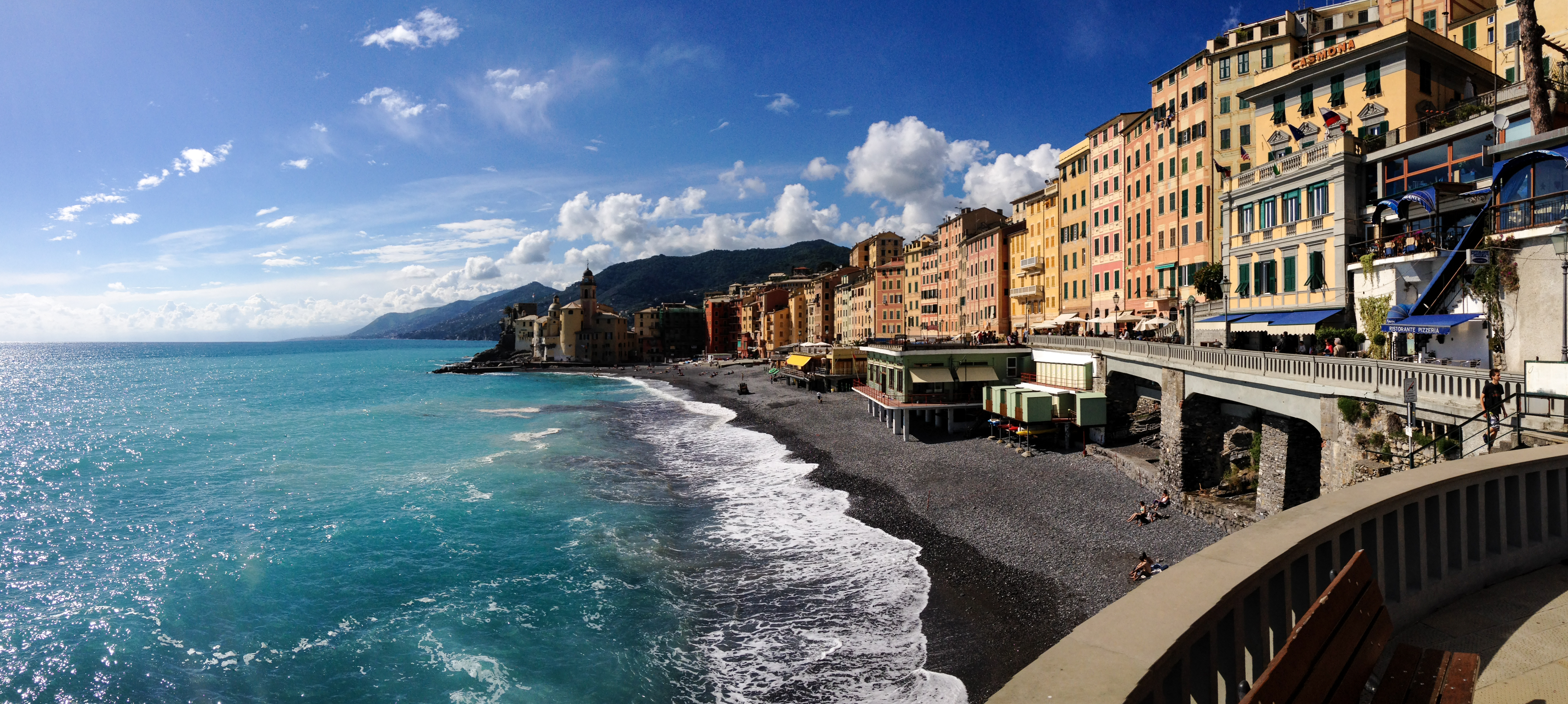
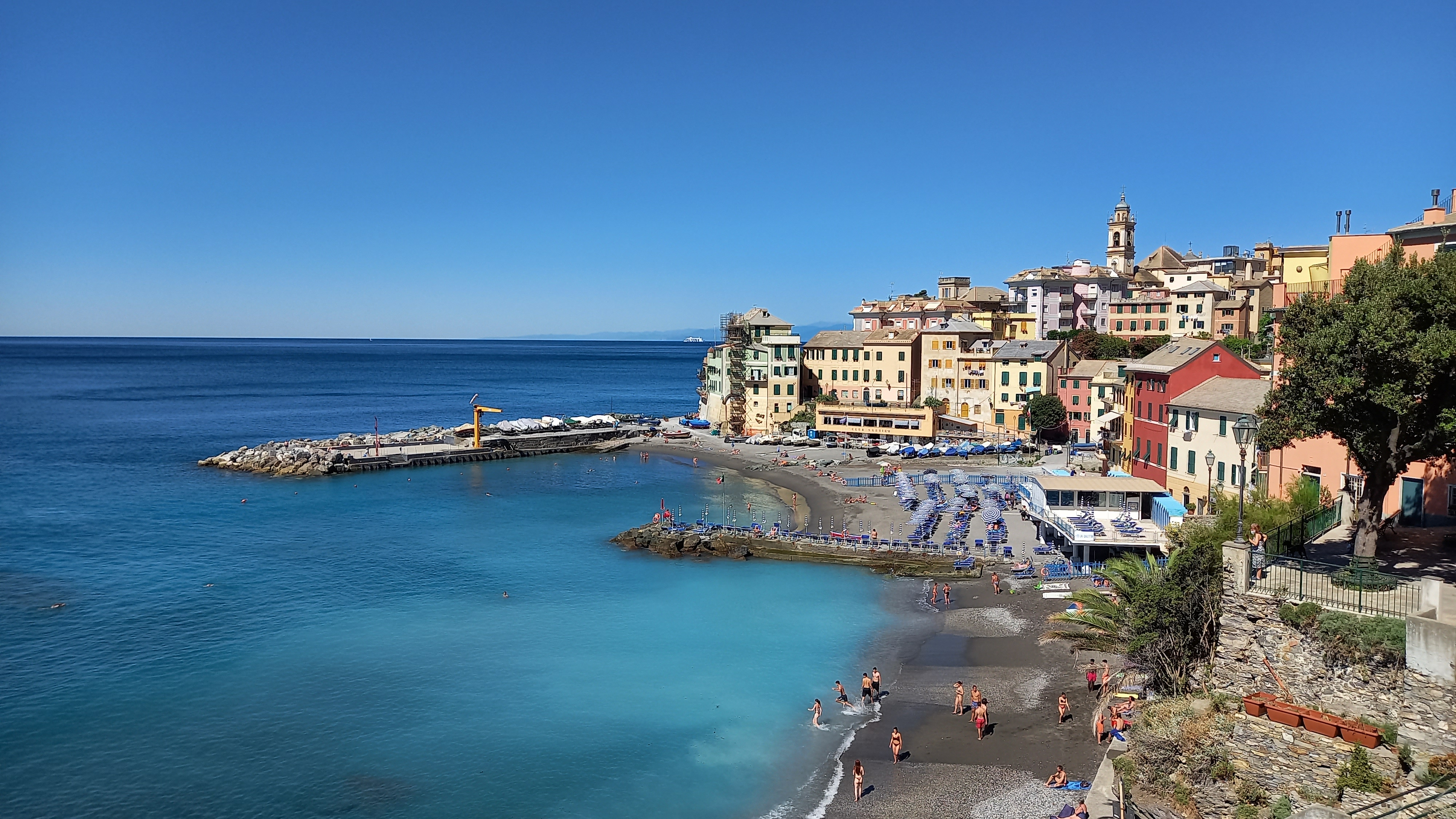
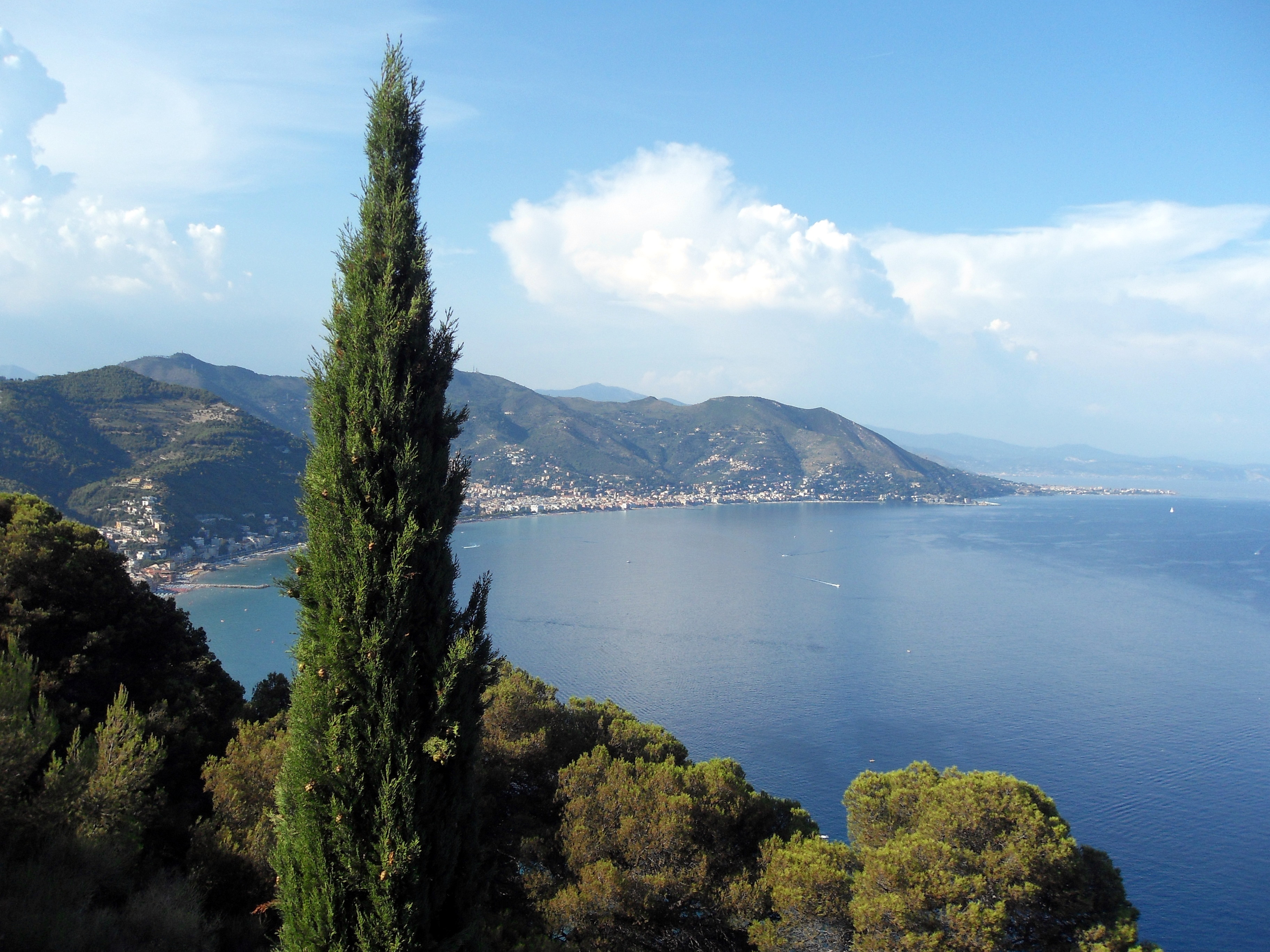
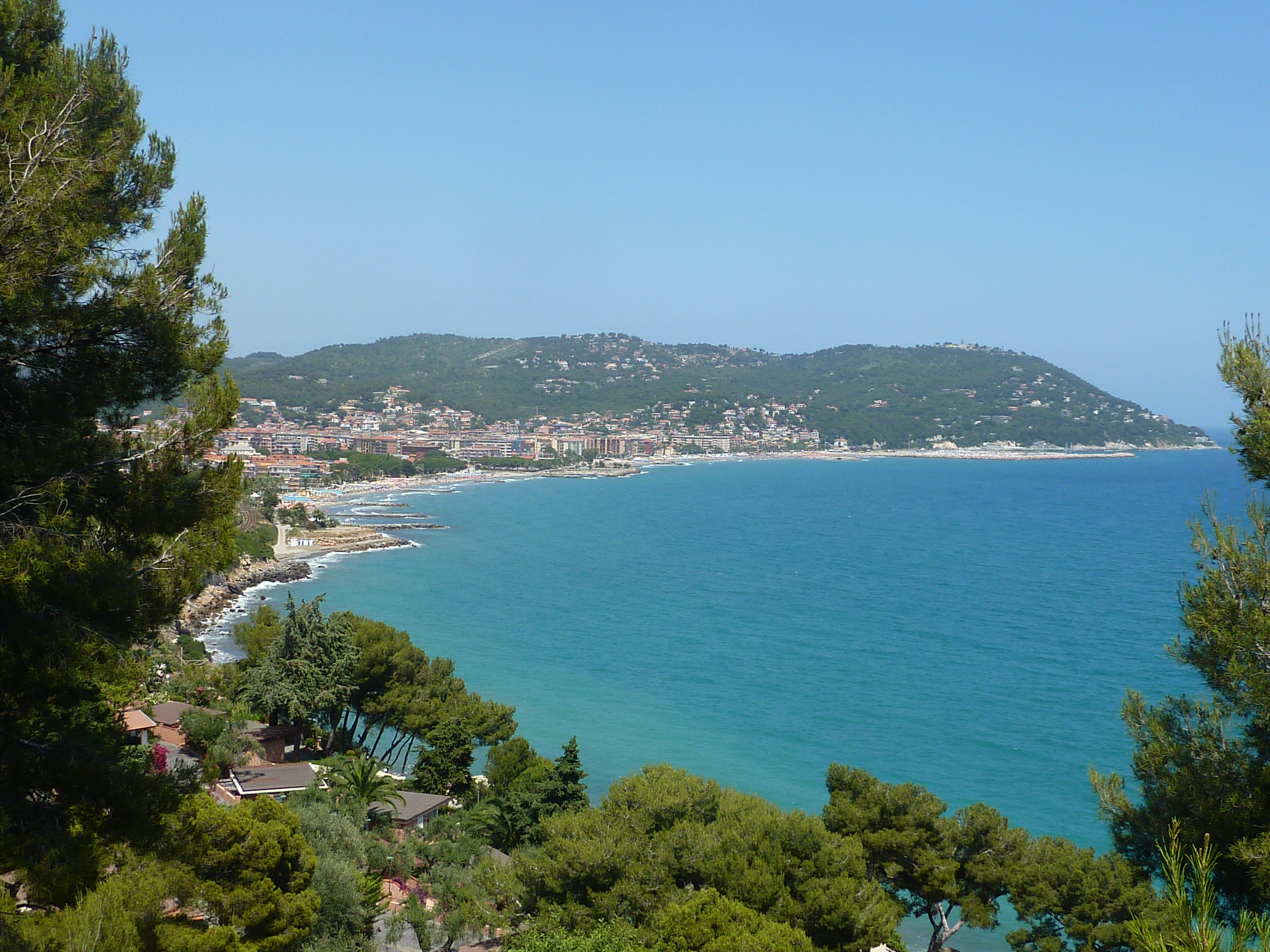
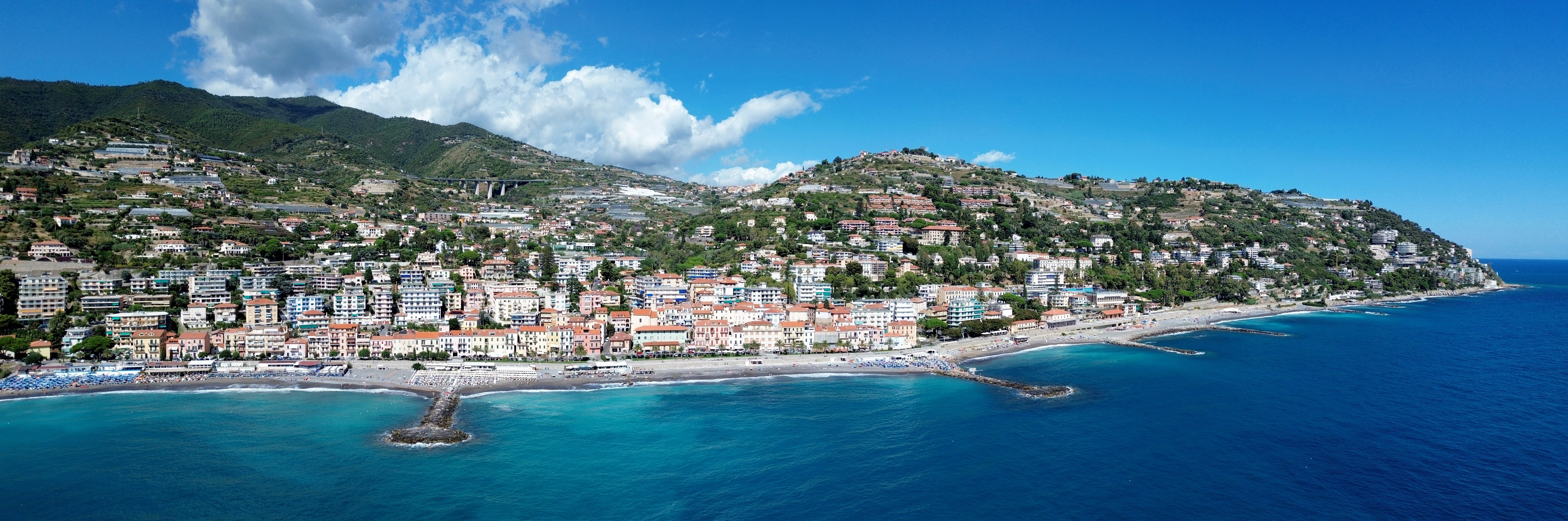
- From top down, left to right: panoramic view of Lerici, Cinque Terre, Levanto, Bonassola, Sestri Levante, Santa Margherita Ligure, Portofino, Camogli, Bogliasco, Alassio, Andora, Ospedaletti
- Interactive map of Italian Riviera
- Coordinates: 44°23′36″N 8°45′17″E
- Country: Italy
- Regione: Liguria
- Metropolitan city: Genoa
- Province: Genoa, Savona, Imperia, La Spezia

Population
  - Total: 1,800,000

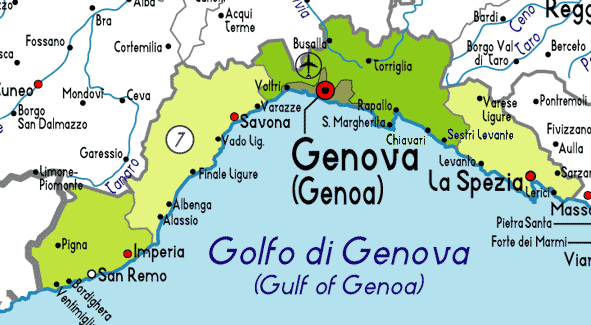
Liguria and the Italian Riviera

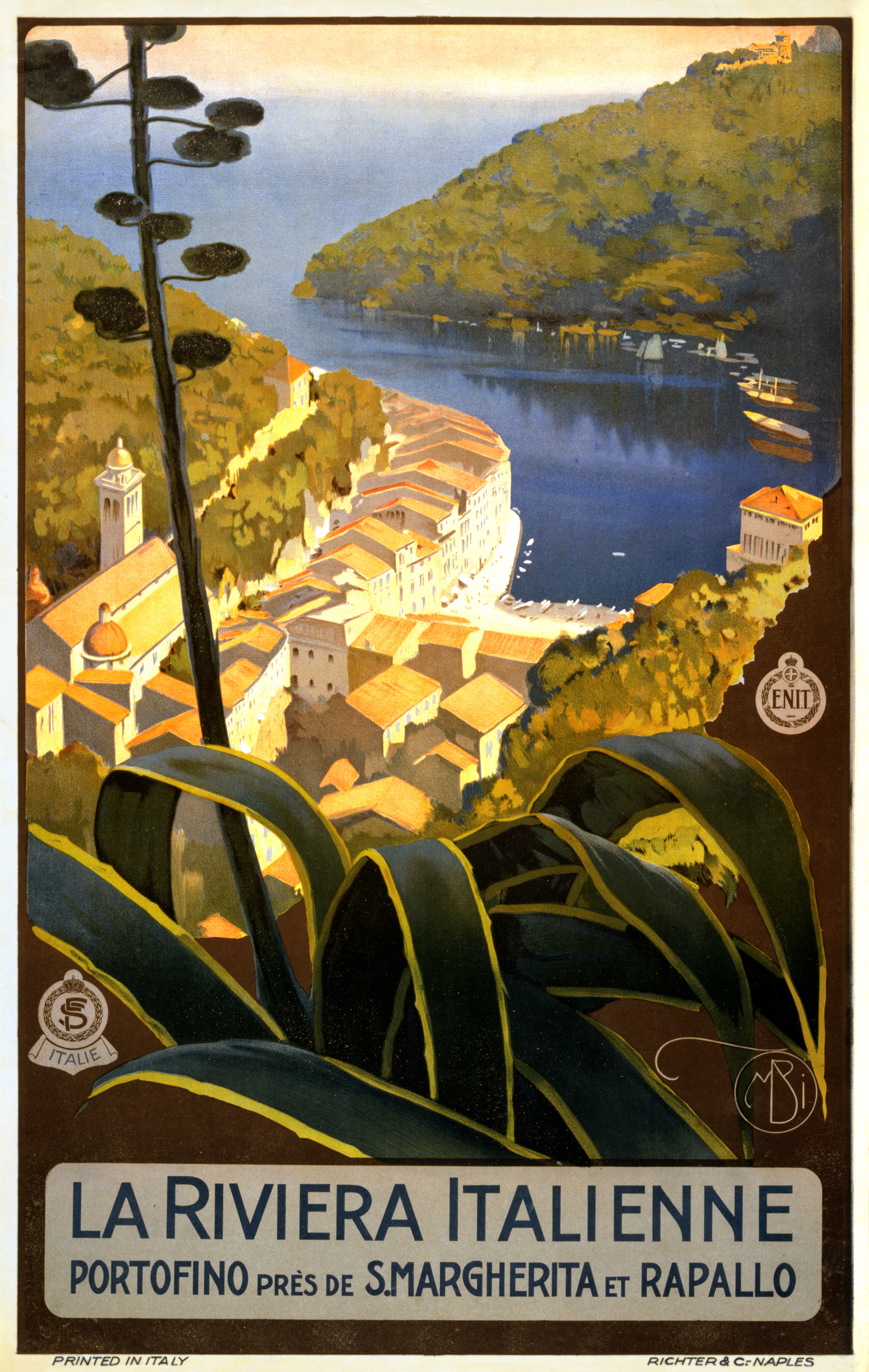
La Riviera italienne, travel poster for ENIT, ca. 1920.

Christ of the Abyss at San Fruttuoso Abbey, Camogli

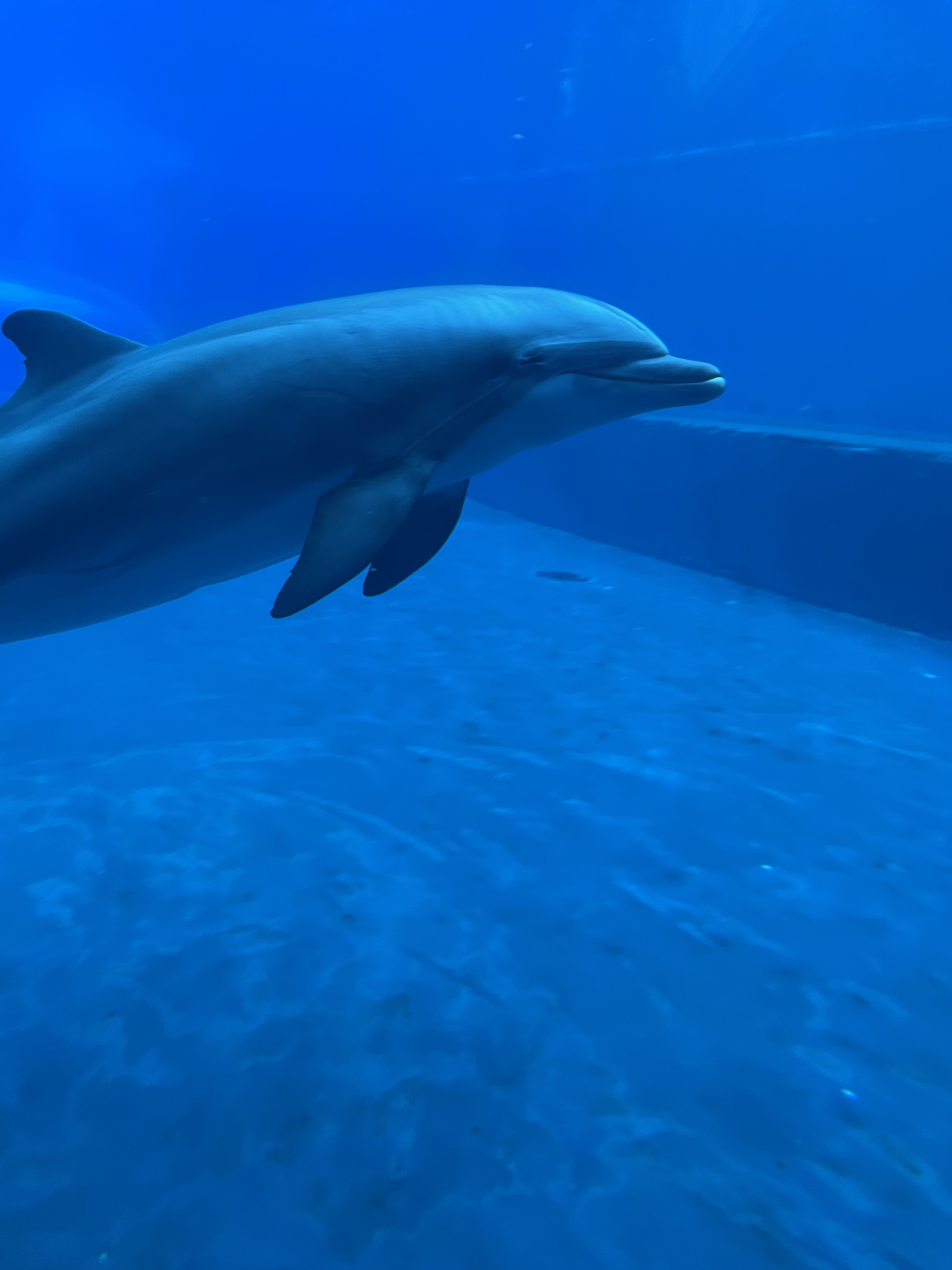
Dolphin at the Aquarium of Genoa

The Italian Riviera or Ligurian Riviera (Italian: Riviera ligure [riˈvjɛːra ˈliːɡure]; Ligurian: Rivêa lìgure [ɾiˈveːa ˈliɡyɾe]) is the narrow coastal strip in Italy which lies between the Ligurian Sea and the mountain chain formed by the Maritime Alps and the Apennines. Longitudinally it extends from the border with France and the French Riviera (or Côte d'Azur) near Ventimiglia (a former customs post) eastwards to Capo Corvo (also known as Punta Bianca) which marks the eastern end of the Gulf of La Spezia and is close to the regional border between Liguria and Tuscany. The Italian Riviera thus includes nearly all of the coastline of Liguria. Historically the "Riviera" extended further to the west, through what is now French territory as far as Marseille.

The Italian Riviera crosses all four Ligurian provinces and their capitals Genoa, Savona, Imperia and La Spezia, with a total length of about 350 km (218 miles). It is customarily divided into a western section, the Ponente Riviera, and an eastern section, the Levante Riviera, the point of division being the apex of the Ligurian arc at Voltri. It has about 1.6 million inhabitants, and most of the population is concentrated within the coastal area. Its mild climate draws an active tourist trade in the numerous coastal resorts, which include Alassio, Bonassola, Bordighera, Camogli, Cinque Terre, Lerici, Levanto, Noli, Portofino, Porto Venere, Santa Margherita Ligure, Sanremo, San Fruttuoso, and Sestri Levante. It is also known for its historical association with international celebrity and artistic visitors; writers and poets like Percy Bysshe Shelley, Lord Byron, Ezra Pound, and Ernest Hemingway were inspired by the beauty and spirit of Liguria.

As a tourist centre, the Italian Riviera benefits from over 300 days of sunshine per year, and is known for its beaches, colourfully painted towns, natural environment, food, and luxury villas and hotels, as well as for its resort facilities, major yachting and cruising areas with several marinas, festivals, golf courses, sailing, rock climbing and scenic views of centuries old farmhouses and cottages.

Industries are concentrated in and around Genoa, Savona, and along the shores of the Gulf of La Spezia. Genoa and La Spezia are Italy's leading shipyards; La Spezia is Italy's major naval base, and Savona is a major centre of the Italian iron industry. Chemical, textile, and food industries are also important.

A number of streets and palaces in the center of Genoa and the Cinque Terre National Park (which includes Cinque Terre, Portovenere, and the islands Palmaria, Tino and Tinetto) are two of Italy's 58 World Heritage Sites.

== Overview ==
The Riviera's centre is Genoa, which divides it into two main sections: the Riviera di Ponente ("the coast of the setting sun"), extending westwards from Genoa to the French border; and the Riviera di Levante ("the coast of the rising sun") between Genoa and Capo Corvo.

It is known for its mild climate and its reputation for a relaxed way of life, old fishing ports, and landscapes. It has been a popular destination for travellers and tourists since the time of Byron and Percy Shelley.

Many villages and towns in the area are internationally known, such as Portofino, Bordighera, Lerici and the Cinque Terre. Many villages of the Italian Riviera are counted among I Borghi più belli d'Italia ("The most beautiful villages of Italy").

The part of the Riviera di Ponente centred on Savona, is called the Riviera delle Palme (the Riviera of palms); the part centred on Sanremo, is the Riviera dei Fiori, after the long-established flower growing industry.

Places on or near the Italian Riviera include:

Municipality	Province or Metropolitan City
Ventimiglia	Imperia (16)
Camporosso	Imperia (16)
Vallecrosia	Imperia (16)
Bordighera	Imperia (16)
Ospedaletti	Imperia (16)
San Remo	Imperia (16)
Taggia	Imperia (16)
Riva Ligure	Imperia (16)
Santo Stefano al Mare	Imperia (16)
Cipressa	Imperia (16)
Costarainera	Imperia (16)
San Lorenzo al Mare	Imperia (16)
Imperia	Imperia (16)
Diano Marina	Imperia (16)
San Bartolomeo al Mare	Imperia (16)
Cervo	Imperia (16)
Andora	Savona (19)
Laigueglia	Savona (19)
Alassio	Savona (19)
Albenga	Savona (19)
Ceriale	Savona (19)
Borghetto Santo Spirito	Savona (19)
Loano	Savona (19)
Pietra Ligure	Savona (19)
Borgio Verezzi	Savona (19)
Finale Ligure	Savona (19)
Noli	Savona (19)
Spotorno	Savona (19)
Bergeggi	Savona (19)
Vado Ligure	Savona (19)
Savona	Savona (19)
Albissola Marina	Savona (19)
Albisola Superiore	Savona (19)
Celle Ligure	Savona (19)
Varazze	Savona (19)
Cogoleto	Genoa (16)
Arenzano	Genoa (16)
Genoa	Genoa (16)
Bogliasco	Genoa (16)
Pieve Ligure	Genoa (16)
Sori	Genoa (16)
Recco	Genoa (16)
Camogli	Genoa (16)
Portofino	Genoa (16)
Santa Margherita Ligure	Genoa (16)
Rapallo	Genoa (16)
Zoagli	Genoa (16)
Chiavari	Genoa (16)
Lavagna	Genoa (16)
Sestri Levante	Genoa (16)
Moneglia	Genoa (16)
Deiva Marina	La Spezia (12)
Framura	La Spezia (12)
Bonassola	La Spezia (12)
Levanto	La Spezia (12)
Monterosso al Mare	La Spezia (12)
Vernazza	La Spezia (12)
Riomaggiore	La Spezia (12)
La Spezia	La Spezia (12)
Portovenere	La Spezia (12)
Lerici	La Spezia (12)
Ameglia	La Spezia (12)
Sarzana	La Spezia (12)

== Islands of Liguria ==
The Italian Riviera offers a few small islands, mostly easily reachable from the coast, like island of Bergeggi and Gallinara, but they cannot be visited because they are protected areas, nature reserves under strict supervision. While, the archipelago of Palmaria, along with Tino and Tinetto, has been a UNESCO World Heritage Site since 1997. The Palmaria, in front of Porto Venere, among all the islands of the riviera, is the most accessible for tourists, with accommodation facilities but always under strict supervision. The Scola is just a little bigger than a skerry on which a defensive tower was built to protect the Gulf of La Spezia.

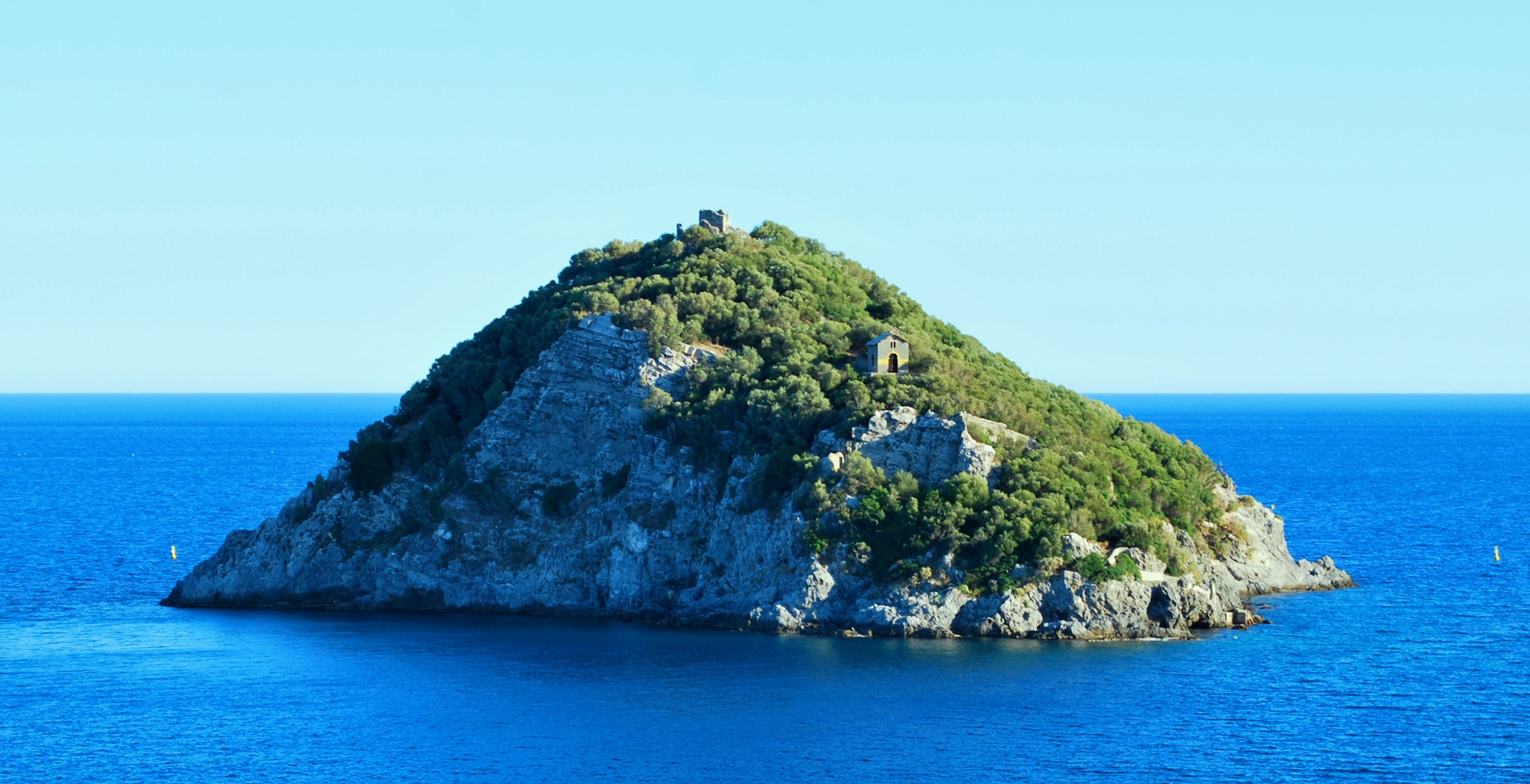
Isola di Bergeggi

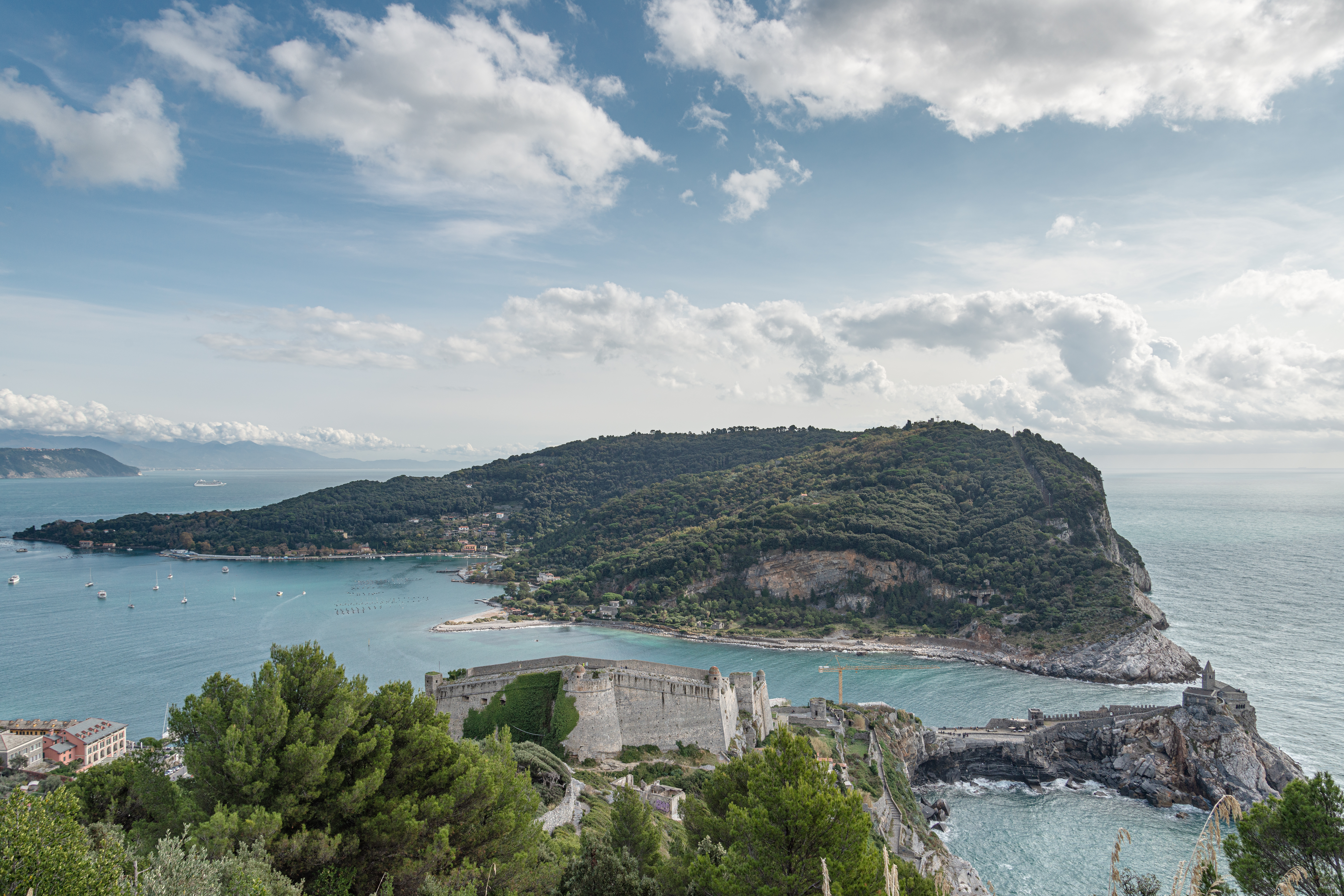
Palmaria Island

- Bergeggi
- Isola Gallinara
- Palmaria
- Tino
- Tinetto
- Scola

== History ==
The history of the Italian Riviera is mainly based on the history of the Liguria region in Italy.

== Aquarium ==
- Aquarium of Genoa, Porto Antico

== Main Buildings ==
- Doge's Palace, Genoa
- Palazzo San Giorgio, Genoa
- Palazzo della Regione Liguria, Genoa

== UNESCO World Heritage Sites ==
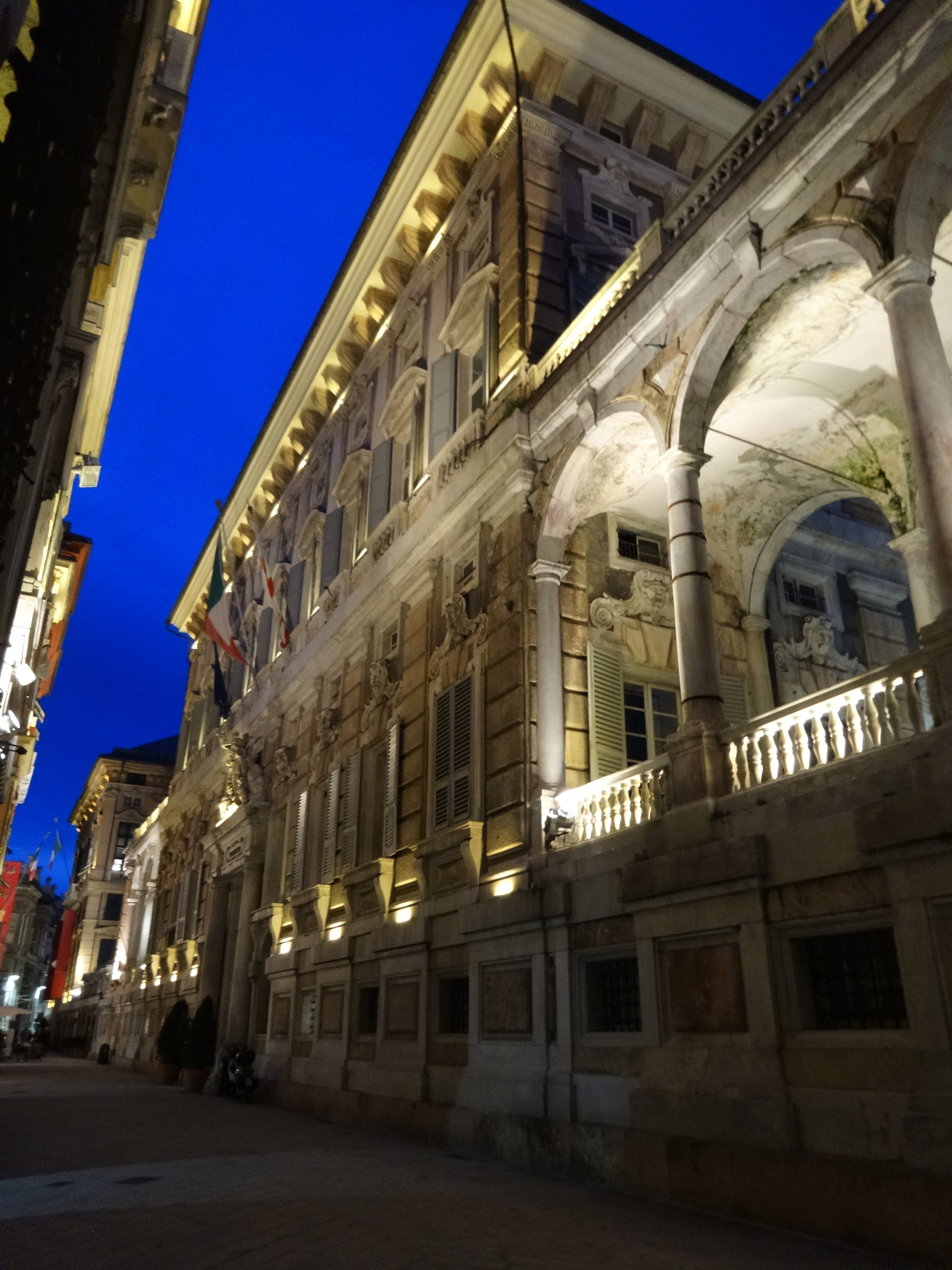
Palazzo Doria Tursi part of the Genoa: Le Strade Nuove and the system of the Palazzi dei Rolli World Heritage Site.

The Italian Riviera contains the following UNESCO World Heritage Sites:

- Genoa: Le Strade Nuove and the system of the Palazzi dei Rolli
- Portovenere, Cinque Terre, and the Islands (Palmaria, Tino and Tinetto)

== Museums and Galleries ==
- Treasure Museum of St. Lorenzo Cathedral, Genoa
- Museum of Sant'Agostino, Genoa
- Museo di Archeologia Ligure, Pegli
- Museo Archeologico del Finale – Convento di Santa Caterina, Finale Ligure
- Museo del Clown – Villa Grock, Imperia
- Galleria Nazionale della Liguria, Palazzo Raggio, Genoa

== Abbeys, Basilicas, Cathedrals, Churches and Sanctuaries ==
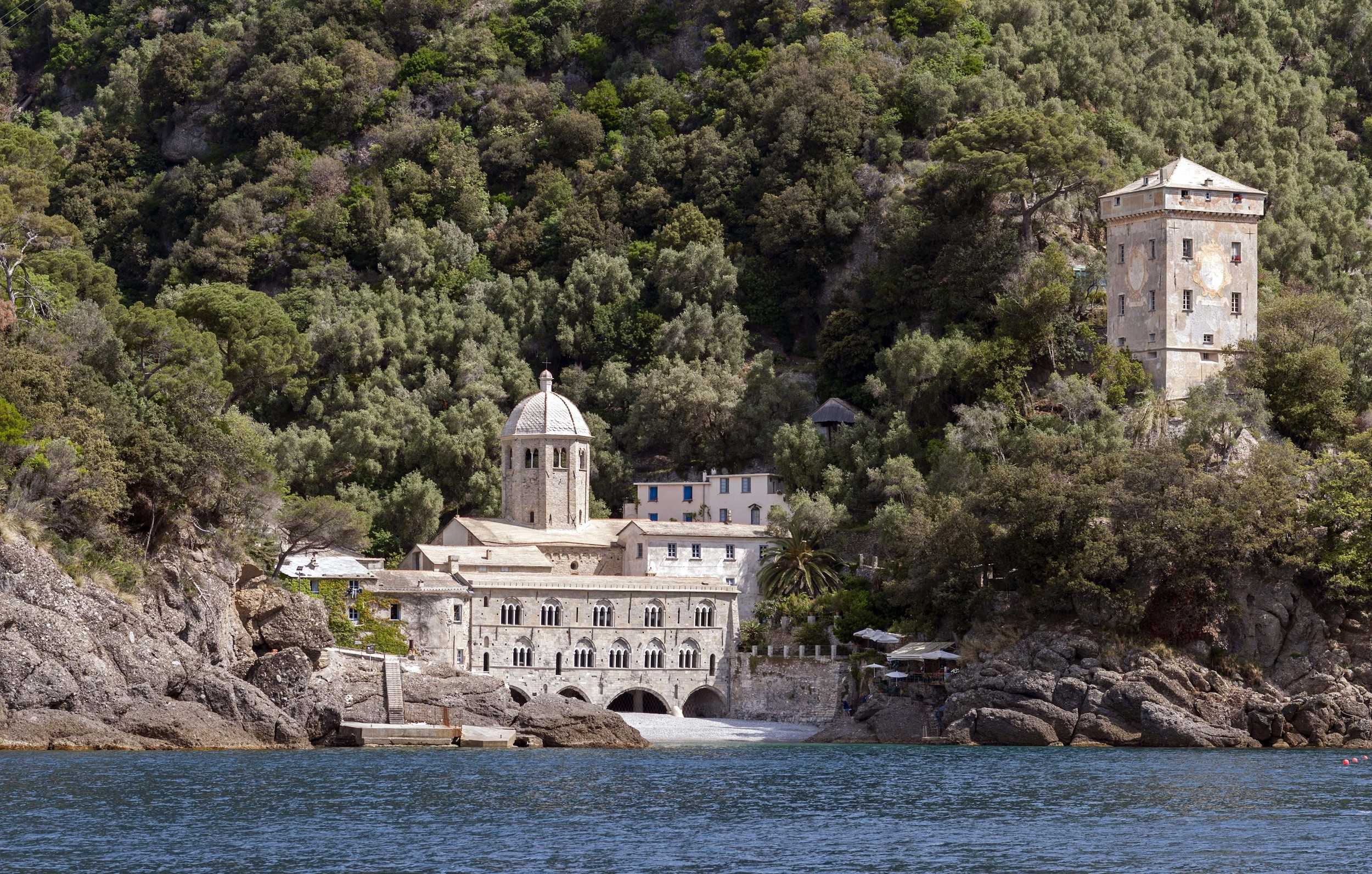
San Fruttuoso Abbey, San Fruttuoso, Camogli

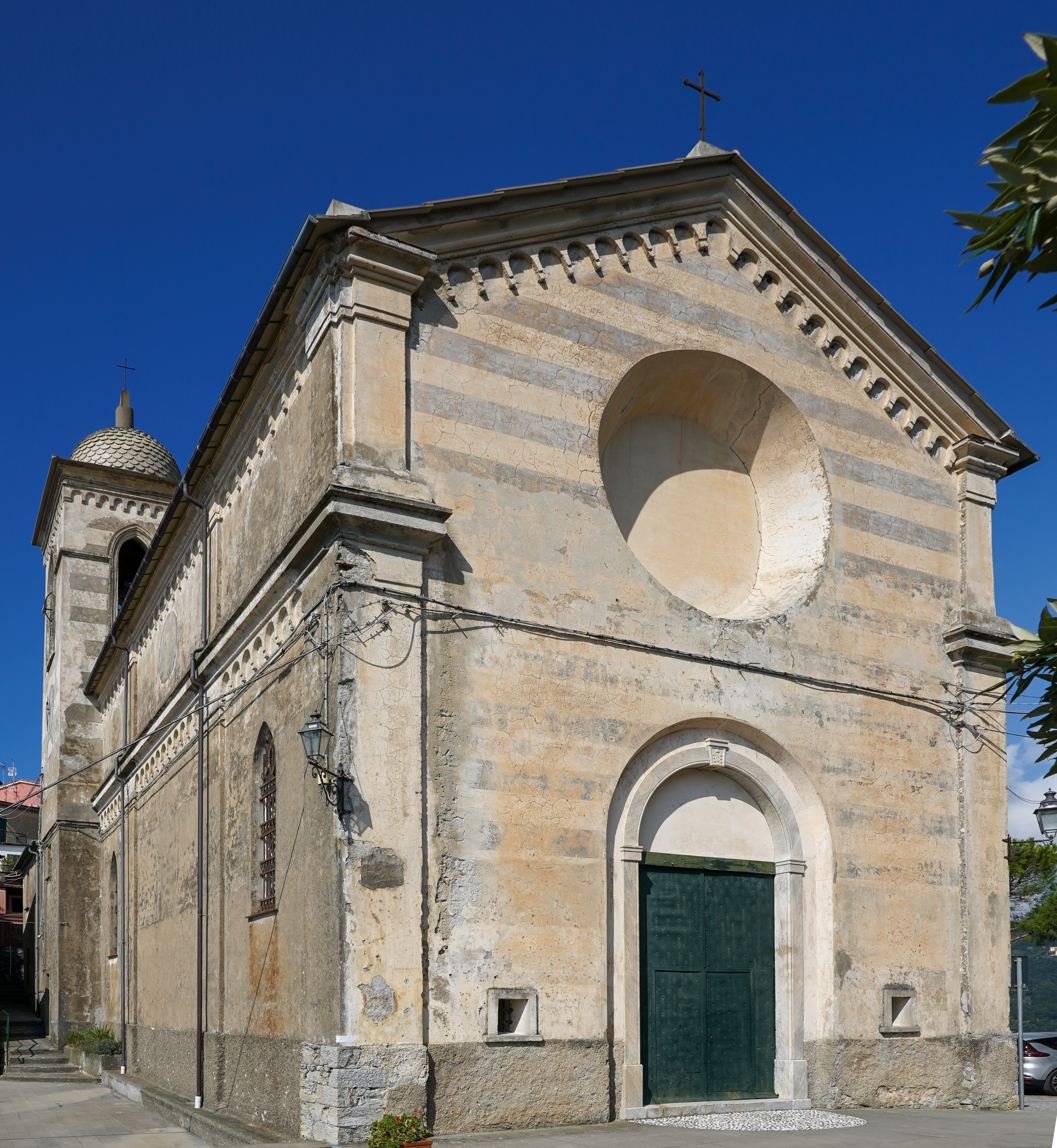
Santuario di Nostra Signora delle Grazie, San Bernardino

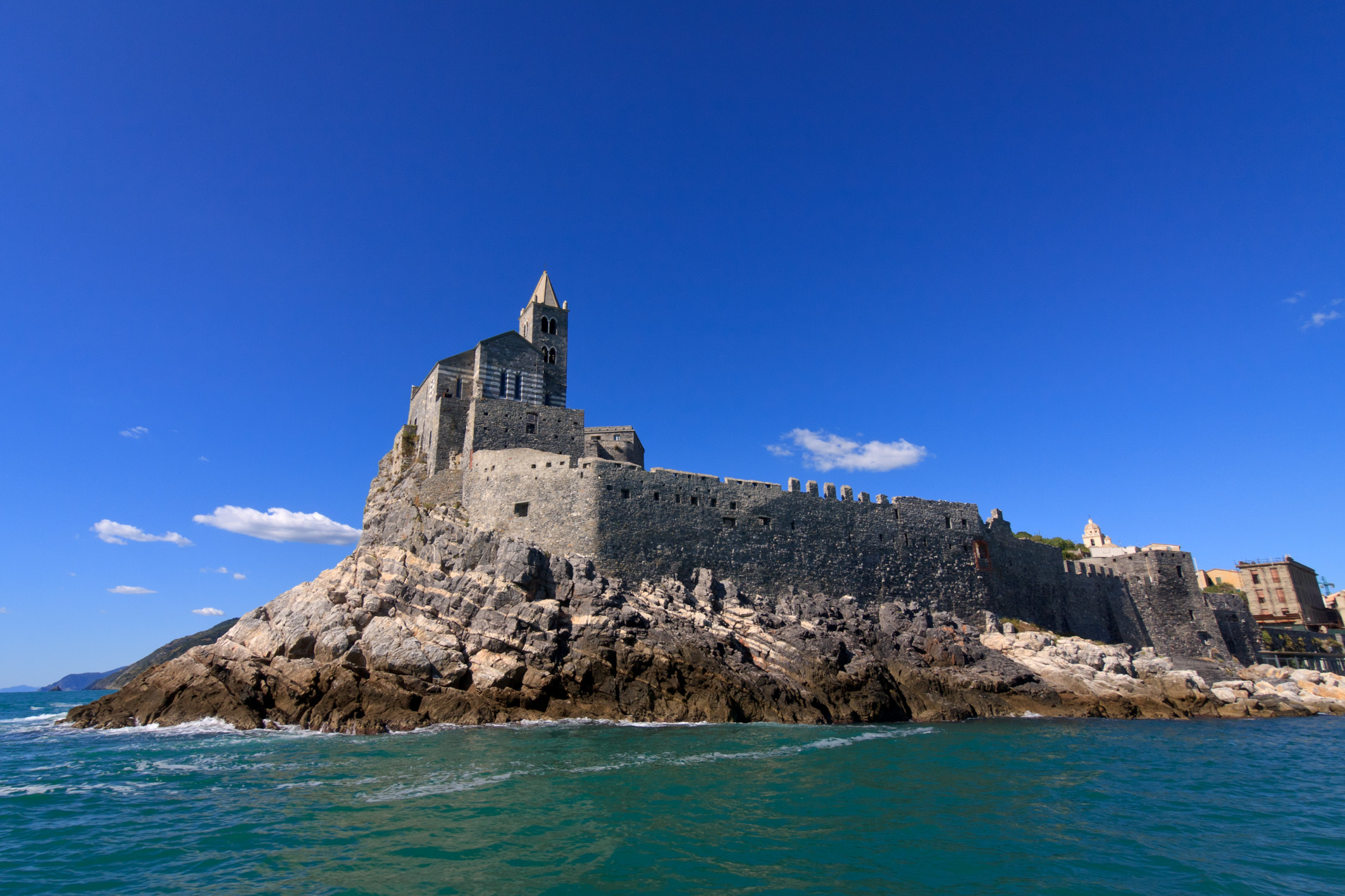
Church of St. Peter, Porto Venere

- San Fruttuoso Abbey, San Fruttuoso, Camogli
- Cathedral of San Lorenzo, Genoa
- Santuario di Nostra Signora della Guardia, Genoa
- Basilica di Santa Margherita Vergine e Martire − Santuario di Nostra Signora della Rosa, Santa Margherita Ligure
- Santuario di Nostra Signora di Montallegro, Rapallo
- Santuario del Bambino Gesù di Praga, Arenzano
- Santuario di Nostra Signora di Montenero, Riomaggiore, Cinque Terre
- Santuario di Nostra Signora della Salute, Volastra, Riomaggiore, Cinque Terre
- Santuario di Nostra Signora delle Grazie, San Bernardino, Vernazza, Cinque Terre
- Santuario di Nostra Signora di Reggio, Vernazza, Cinque Terre
- Santuario di Nostra Signora di Soviore, Monterosso al Mare, Cinque Terre
- Basilica di Santa Maria di Nazareth, Sestri Levante
- Cattedrale di Nostra Signora dell'Orto, Chiavari
- Collegiata di Sant'Ambrogio, Alassio
- Cattedrale di San Michele Arcangelo, Albenga
- Chiesa di San Pietro, Porto Venere
- Chiesa del Divo Martino, Portofino
- Chiesa di San Giorgio, Portofino

== Forts, Towers and castles ==
Santa Margherita Ligure’s harbour and castle

- Torre degli Embriaci, Genoa
- Renzo Piano's Torre dei Piloti, Genoa
- Castello Brown, Portofino
- Castello San Giorgio, Portofino
- Castello di Paraggi, Paraggi
- Castello di Santa Margherita Ligure, Santa Margherita Ligure
- Castello di Punta Pagana, Rapallo
- Castello di Rapallo, Rapallo
- Castello di Monte Ursino, Noli
- Castello di Lerici, Lerici
- Castello di San Terenzo, San Terenzo, Lerici
- Castello di Ameglia, Ameglia
- Castello Sem Benelli, Zoagli
- Castello Türcke, Genoa
- Castello Mackenzie, Genoa
- Castello d'Albertis, Genoa
- Castello della Dragonara, Camogli
- Castello di Chiavari, Chiavari
- Castello di San Giorgio, La Spezia
- Castello di Porto Venere, Porto Venere
- Fortezza di Sarzanello, Sarzana
- Fortezza del Priamar, Savona
- Castello di Spotorno, Spotorno
- Castello di Andora, Andora
- Castelfranco, Finale Ligure
- Castel Gavone, Finale Ligure
- Castelletto, Finale Ligure
- Forte San Giovanni, Finale Ligure
- Castello di Albisola, Albisola Superiore

== Lighthouses ==
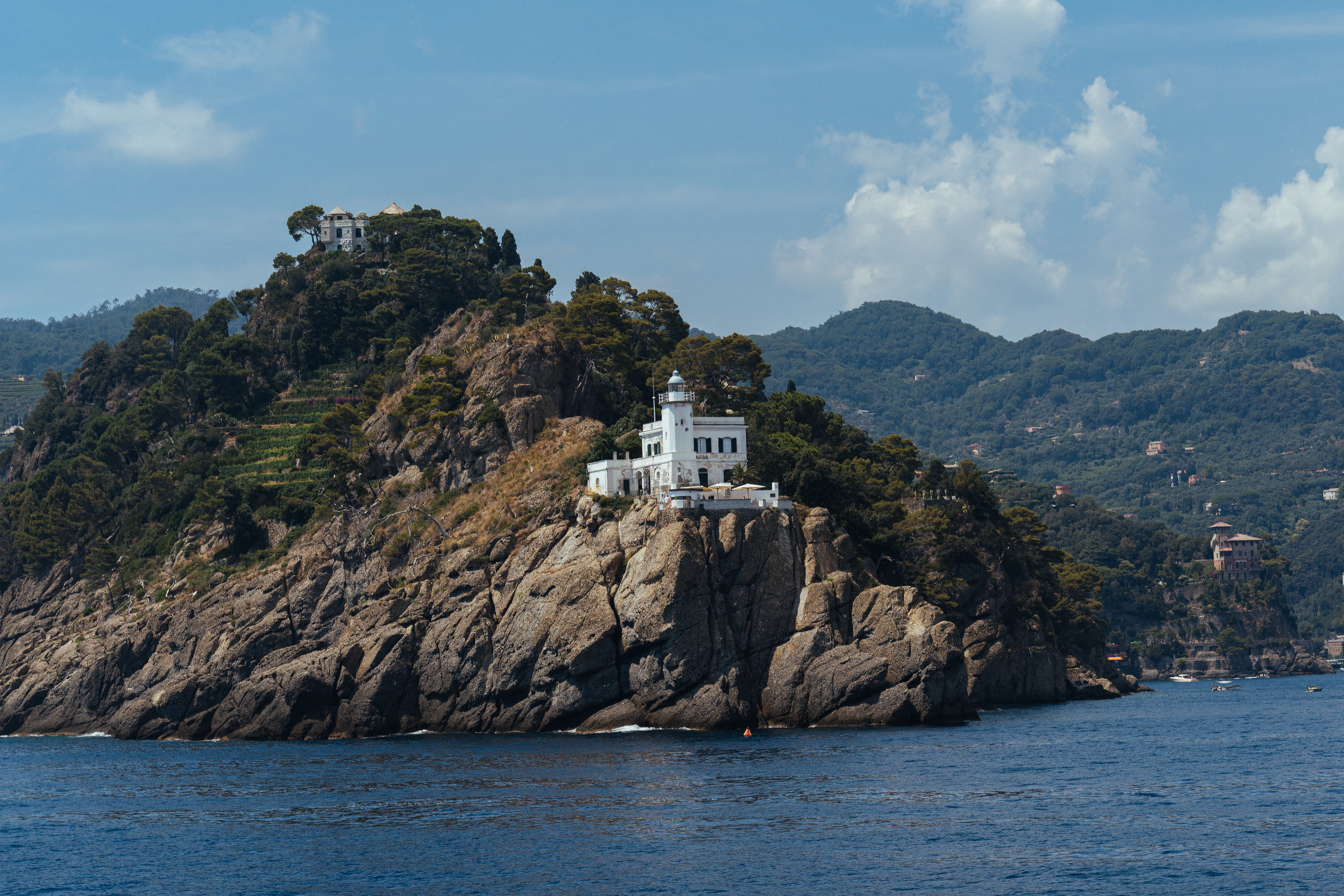
Portofino Lighthouse

- La Lanterna, Genoa
- Portofino Lighthouse, Portofino
- Capo Mele Lighthouse, Andora

== Parks ==
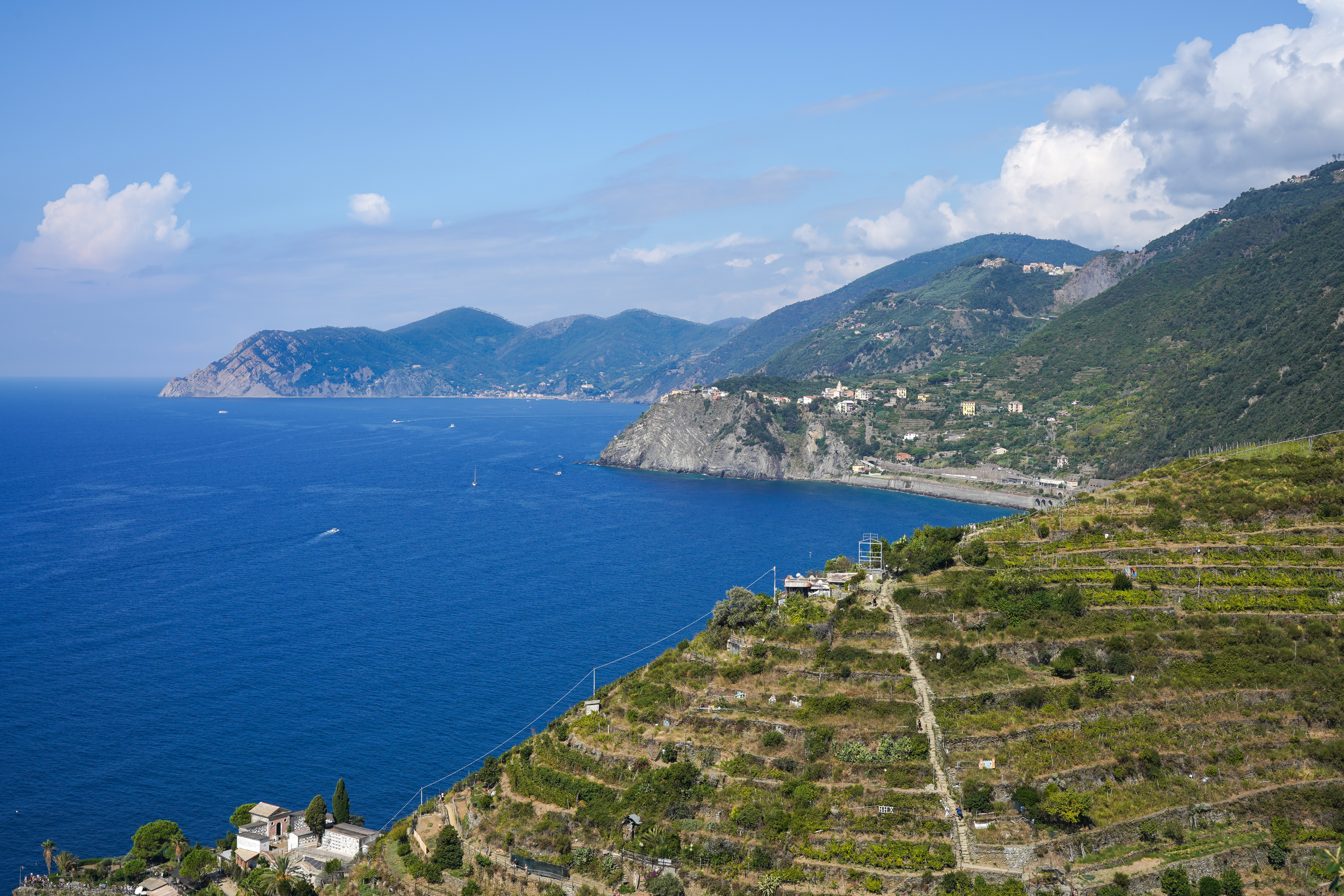
Cinque Terre National Park

- Parco naturale regionale di Portovenere
- Parco Nazionale delle Cinque Terre
- Parco naturale regionale di Portofino
- Parco naturale regionale del Beigua
- Parco naturale regionale di Bric Tana
- Parco naturale regionale di Piana Crixia
- Parco naturale regionale dell'Antola
- Parco naturale regionale dell'Aveto
- Parco naturale regionale di Montemarcello - Magra
- Parco naturale regionale delle Alpi Liguri

== Trekking and Hiking ==
- Alta Via dei Monti Liguri

== Caves ==
- Toirano Caves, Toirano, Savona
- Borgio Verezzi Caves, Borgio Verezzi, Savona
- Caverna delle Arene Candide, Finale Ligure
- Balzi Rossi Caves, Ventimiglia

== Gardens ==
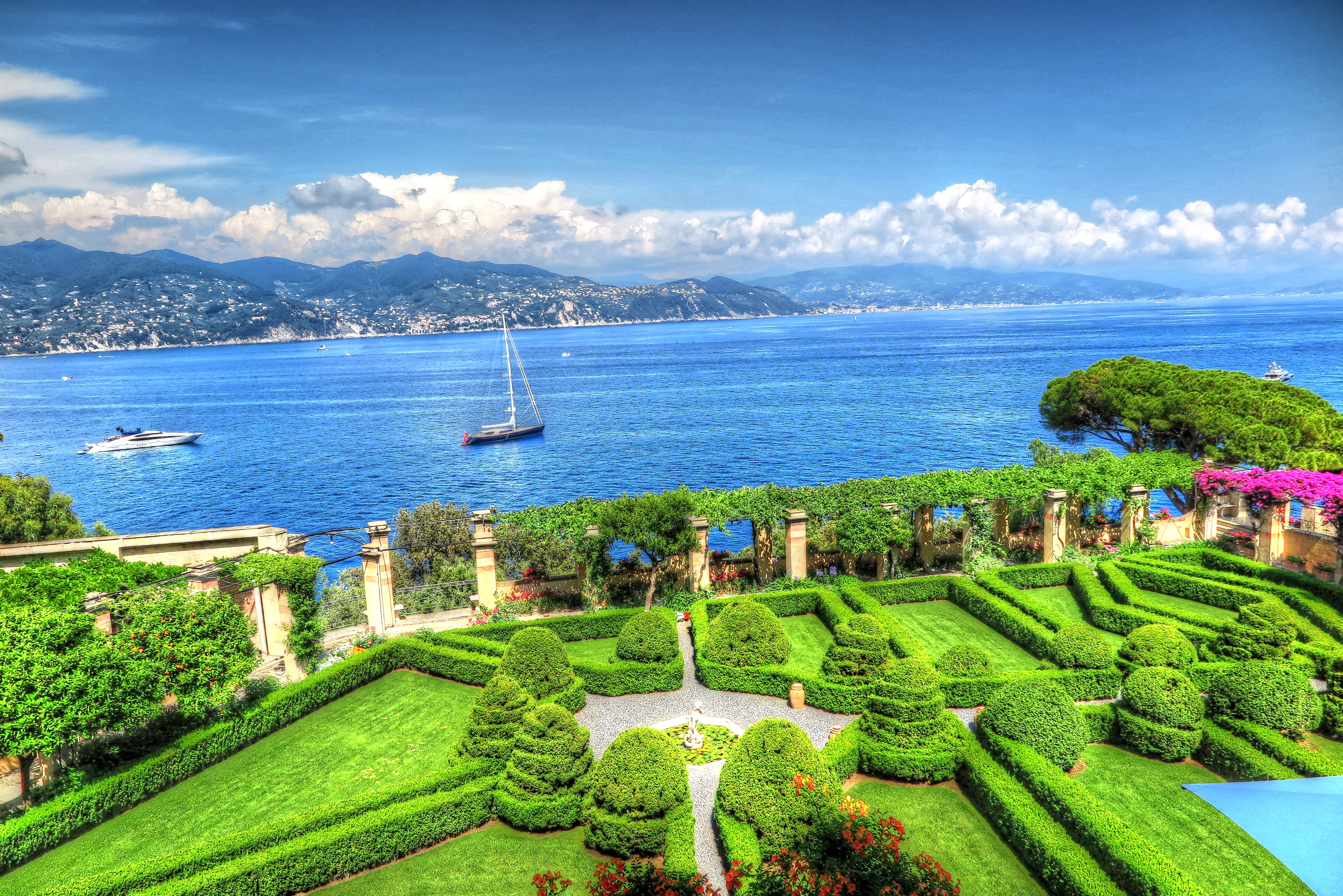
Giardino all'italiana Cervara Abbey

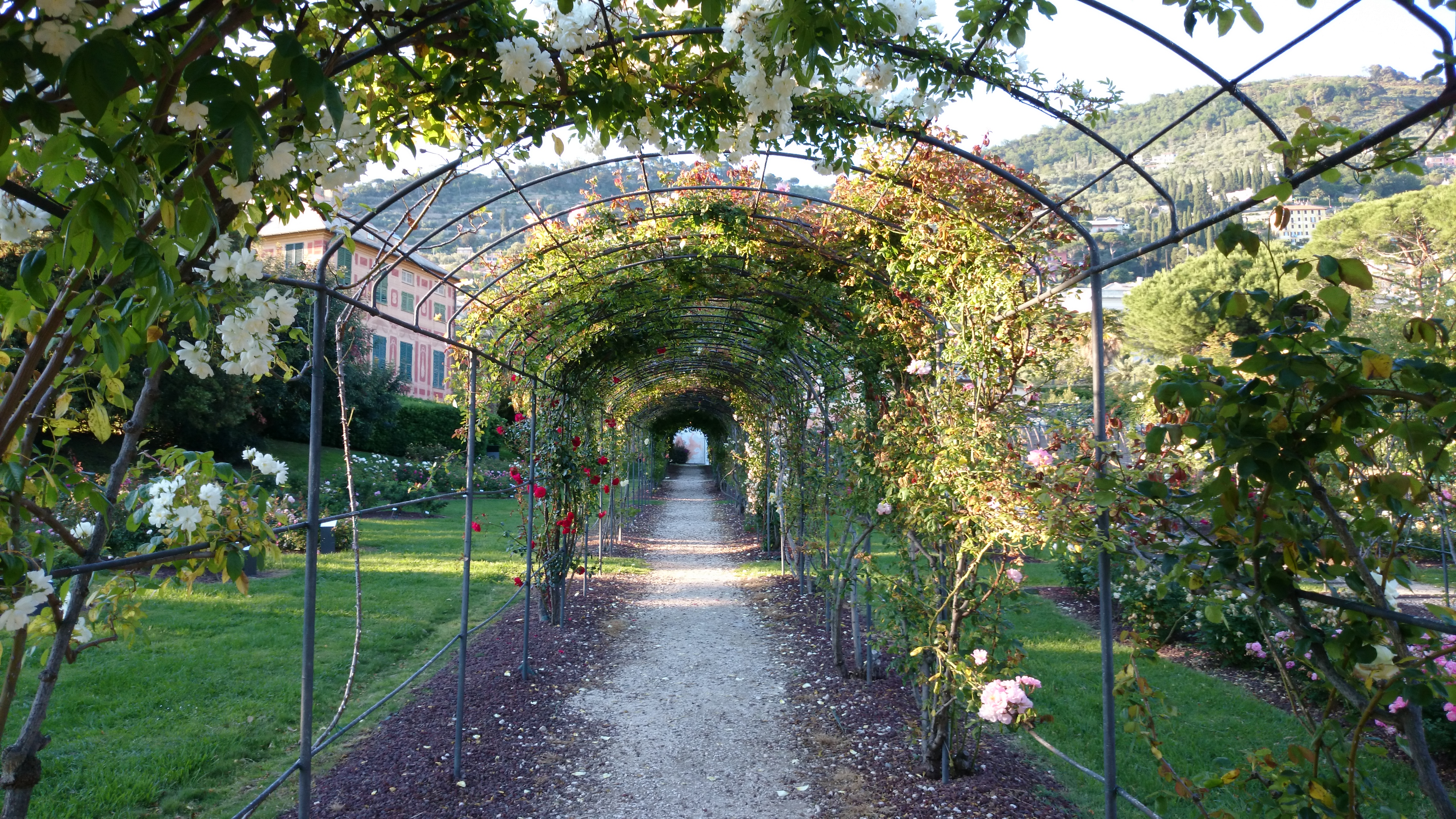
Villa Grimaldi Fassio - Rose Garden, Nervi

- Giardini Botanici Hanbury, Mortola Inferiore, Ventimiglia, Liguria.
- Giardino all'italiana Cervara Abbey, Santa Margherita Ligure, Liguria.
- Giardini di Villa della Pergola, Alassio, Liguria.
- Giardini Botanici Caneva, Sarzana, Liguria.
- Villa Durazzo-Pallavicini, Pegli, Genoa, Liguria.
- Villa Durazzo-Centurione, Santa Margherita Ligure, Liguria.
- Villa Grimaldi Fassio, Nervi, Genoa, Liguria.
- Villa Saluzzo Serra, Nervi, Genoa, Liguria.

== Events and festivals ==
- Campionato Mondiale di Pesto Genovese al Mortaio
- Slow Fish, Genoa
- Carnevalöa - Carnival of Loano
- Carnevale di Diano Marina
- Barcarolata in Sestri Levante
- Sanremo in Fiore - Corso Fiorito - Carnival of Sanremo
- Euroflora, Genoa
- Yacht & Garden, Genoa
- Festival Internazionale del Balletto e della Musica in Nervi Genoa
- Festival della Scienza in Genoa
- Genoa International Boat Show
- Premio Paganini in Genoa
- Sanremo Music Festival
- Rallye Sanremo
- Riviera International Film Festival
- Milan-Sanremo annual cycling race
- Palio Marinaro di San Pietro in Genoa
- Regatta of the Historical Marine Republics in Genoa
- Palio del Golfo in La Spezia
- The Ocean Race in Genoa
- Regate di Primavera in Portofino
- Giro d'Italia cycling race
- Mille Miglia in Genoa
- Millevele in Genoa
- Vele d' Epoca in Imperia
- Red Bull Cerro Abajo in Genoa
- Trofeo Laigueglia cycling race in Laigueglia
- Megacon - Comics, Videogames and Pop culture event in Genoa
- Liguria Golf Experience Tour
- Golf in Fiore
- Golf senza barriere
- Aromatica, Diano Marina
- Genova Design Week, Genoa
- Festa dello Sport, Genoa
- Festa della Marina Militare Italiana, Genoa
- Concorso Lirico Internazionale di Portofino

== Casino ==
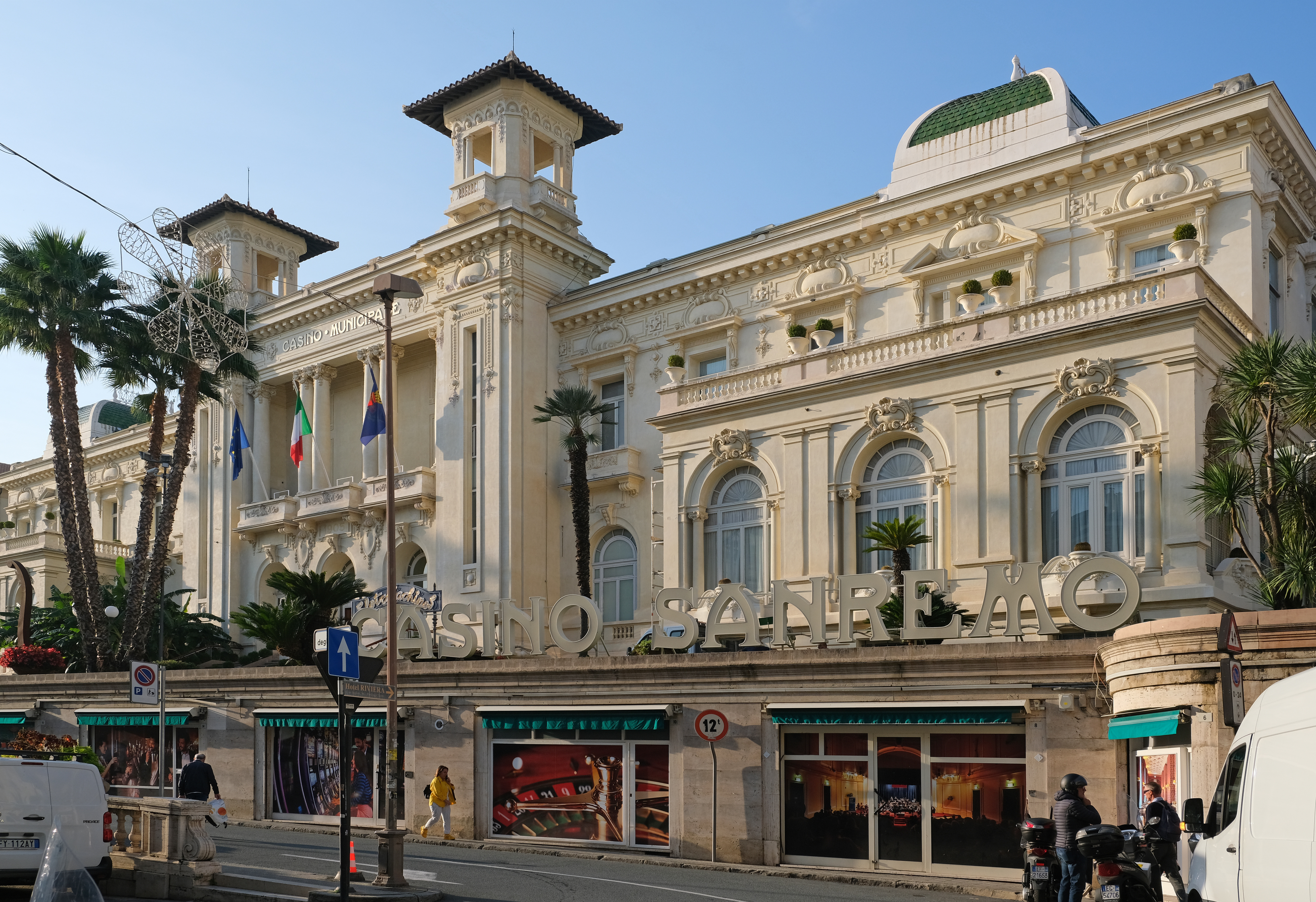
Sanremo Casino

- Sanremo Casino

== Yacht clubs ==
- Yacht Club Italiano, Genoa
- Yacht Club Tigullio, Santa Margherita Ligure, Genoa
- Yacht Club Rapallo, Rapallo, Genoa
- Yacht Club Marina di Loano, Loano, Savona
- Yacht Club Imperia, Imperia
- Yacht Club Sanremo, Sanremo, Imperia

== Golf clubs ==
- Sarzana Golf Club, Sarzana, La Spezia
- Golf Club Marigola, La Spezia
- Circolo Golf e Tennis Rapallo, Rapallo, Genoa
- Garden Golf, Albaro, Genoa
- Cus Genova Golf Quarto Alto, Genoa
- Golf della Pineta di Arenzano, Arenzano, Genoa
- Sant´anna Golf Lerca, Cogoleto, Genoa
- Golf Club La Filanda Carpineto, Albisola Superiore, Savona
- Golf Club Garlenda, Garlenda, Savona
- Golf Club Castellaro, Castellaro, Imperia
- Golf degli Ulivi Sanremo, Sanremo, Imperia

== Typical cuisine, food and wine ==
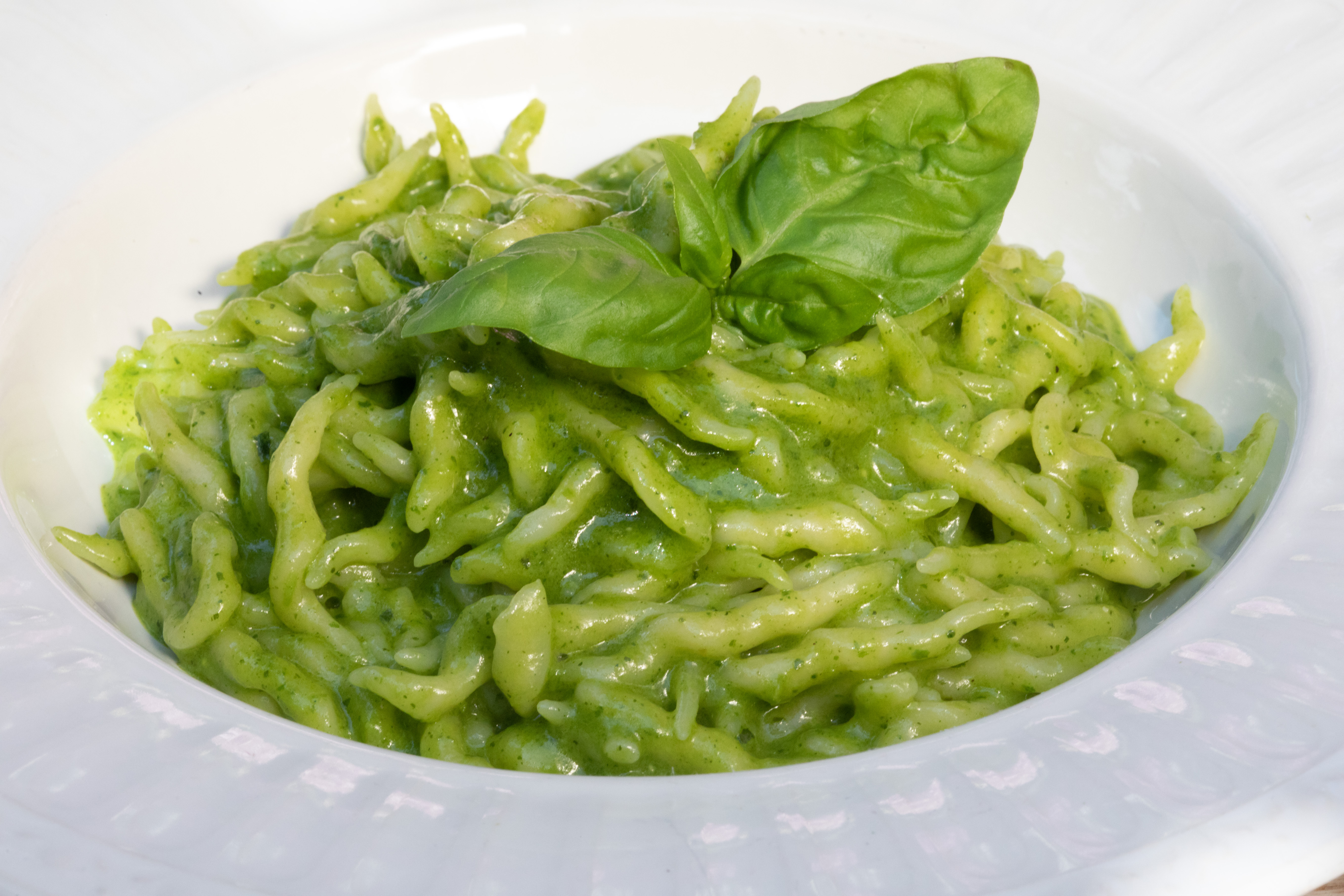
Trofie al pesto

- Pesto
- Trofie al Pesto
- Trenette al Pesto
- Trenette al Pesto con patate
- Trenette al Pesto con patate e fagiolini
- Linguine al Pesto
- Mandilli al Pesto
- Pansoti alla salsa di noci
- Ravioli di borragine alla ligure
- Ravioli di pesce alla ligure
- Ravioli di carne alla genovese
- Ravioli alla genovese
- Ravioli alla genovese con il sugo di funghi
- Focaccia Genovese
- Focaccia di Recco (focaccia col formaggio)
- Focaccia di Recco con prosciutto crudo di Parma
- Focaccia con le cipolle
- Focaccia con le olive
- Focaccia con le patate
- Focaccette al formaggio di Sori, Recco, Uscio e Camogli
- Focaccia ligure con pomodori e olive taggiasce
- Focaccia ligure con pomodori, olive taggiasce e acciughe
- Sardenaira di Sanremo
- Focaccia Pizzata
- Farinata di ceci
- Taggiasca olives (Taggia)
- Spumante Bisson Abissi
- Sciacchetrà
- Pigato
- Rossese
- Vermentino
- Vermentino Colli di Luni
- Rosso Colli di Luni

=== Typical desserts, pastries and ice cream ===
- Pandolce genovese (with two variants, alto or basso)
- Baci di Loano
- Baci di Alassio
- Canestrelli
- Canestrellini
- Cubeletti (biscuit, typical of Rapallo, with variants of Cogoleto and Finale Ligure)
- Biscotti del Lagaccio (biscuit, typical of Genoa)
- Biscotti della Salute
- Amaretti di Sassello (biscuit, typical of Sassello)
- Torta Sacripantina
- Gelato alle Rose
- Gelato alla Mimosa
- Gelato Pinguino di Santa Margherita Ligure (ice cream covered with a dark chocolate coating, typical of Santa Margherita Ligure)
- Pànera (coffee semifreddo, typical of Genoa)
- Super Banana split (variant of Banana split with strawberries, typical of Sestri Levante)

== Painters ==
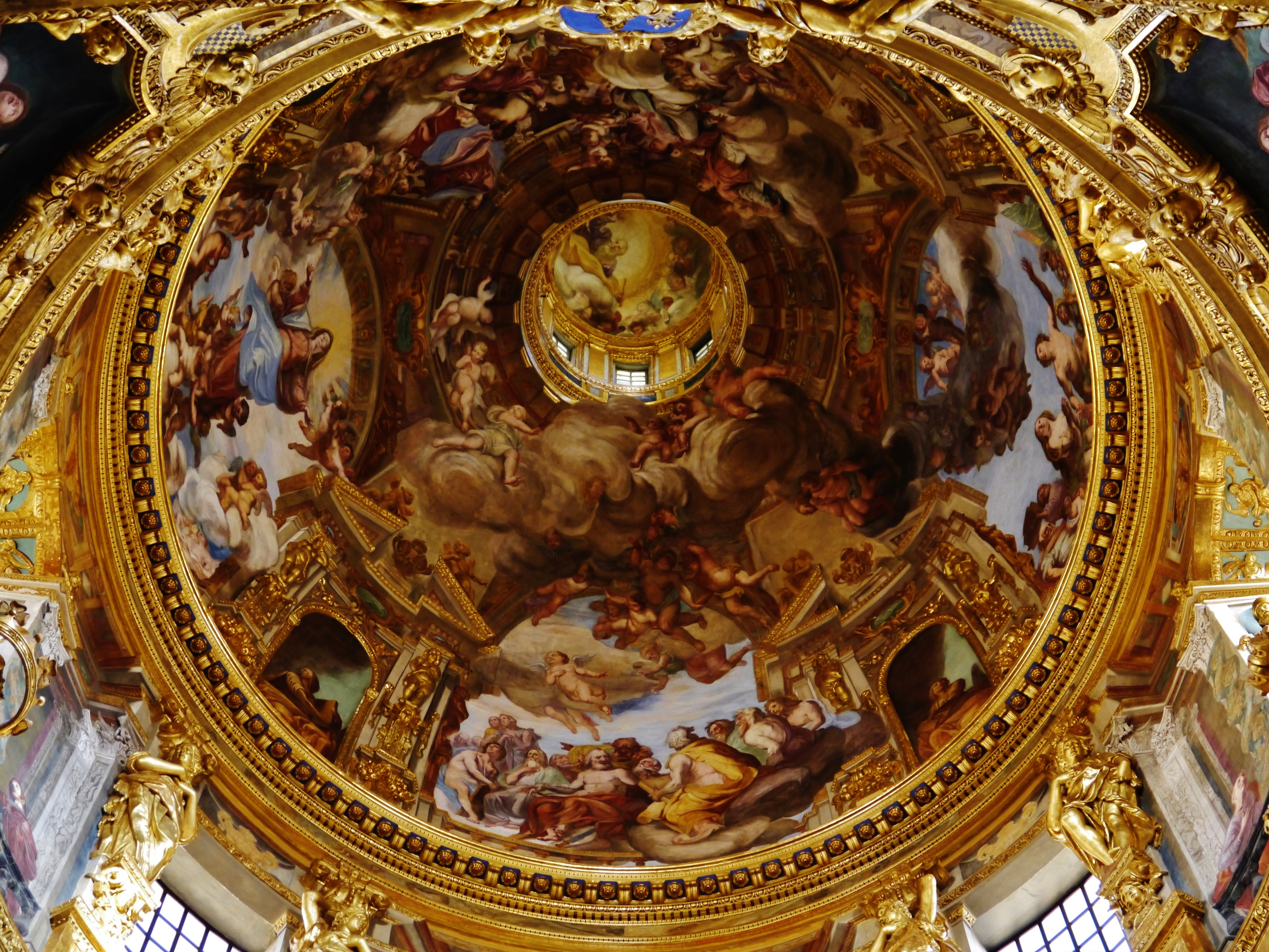
The Assumption, painted by Giovanni Andrea Ansaldo in the dome of the Basilica della Santissima Annunziata del Vastato, Genoa

- Giovanni Andrea Ansaldo (1584–1638)
- Bernardo Strozzi (1582–1644)
- Gioacchino Assereto (1600–1649)
- Giovanni Lorenzo Bertolotto (1640–1721)
- Giovan Battista Gaulli (Baciccio) (1639–1709)

== Musicians ==
- Niccolò Paganini (1782–1840)
- Michele Novaro (1818–1885)

== Poets and Writers ==
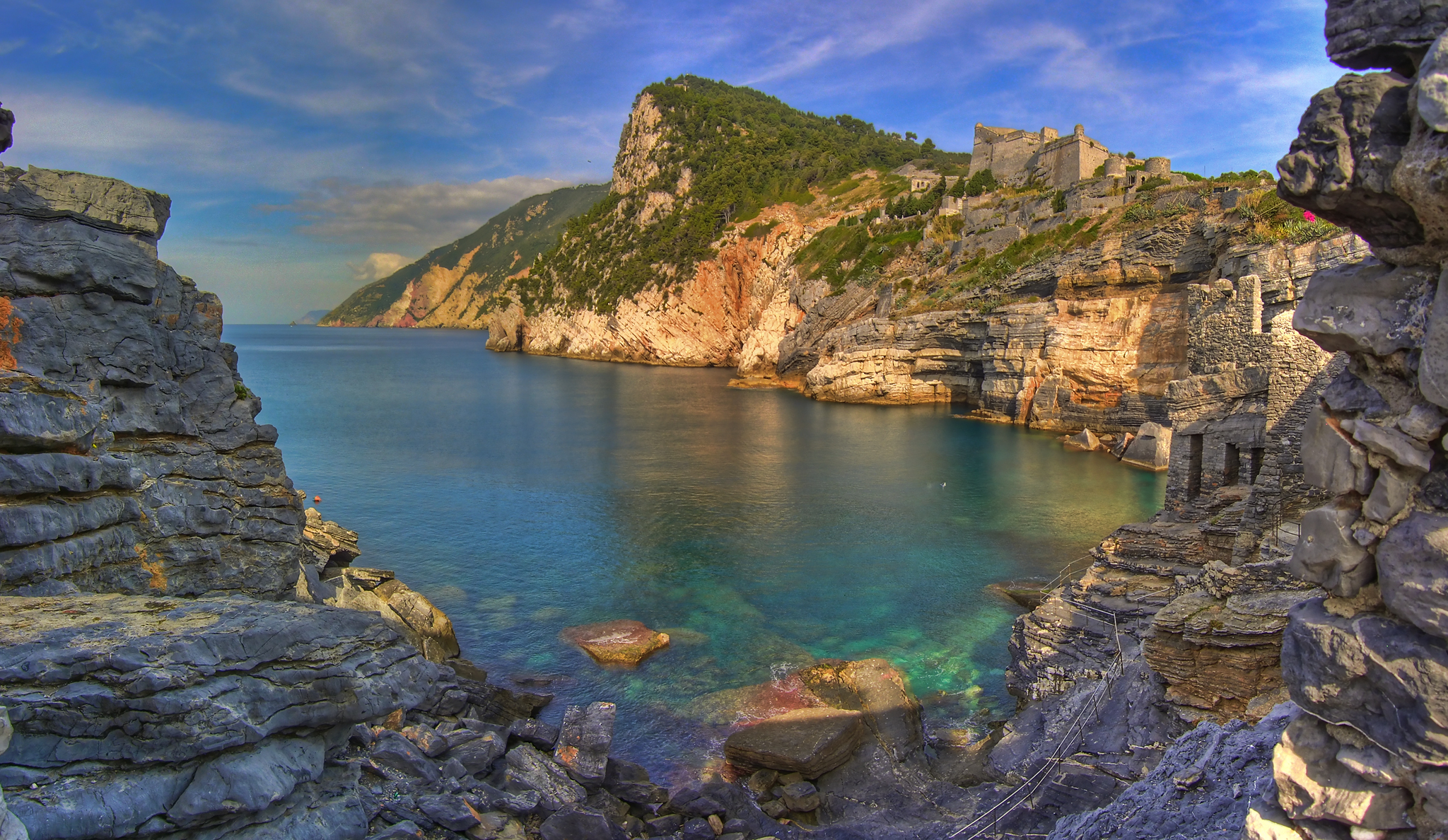
Lord Byron's rocks and sea view in Porto Venere, Italy, named in Byron's honour because, according to local legend, he meditated here and drew inspiration from this place for his literary works

- Goffredo Mameli (1827–1849)
- Mario Novaro (1868–1944)
- Ceccardo Roccatagliata Ceccardi (1871–1919)
- Pietro Sbarbaro, aka Camillo Sbarbaro (1888–1967)
- Eugenio Montale (1896–1981)

== Cycling paths ==
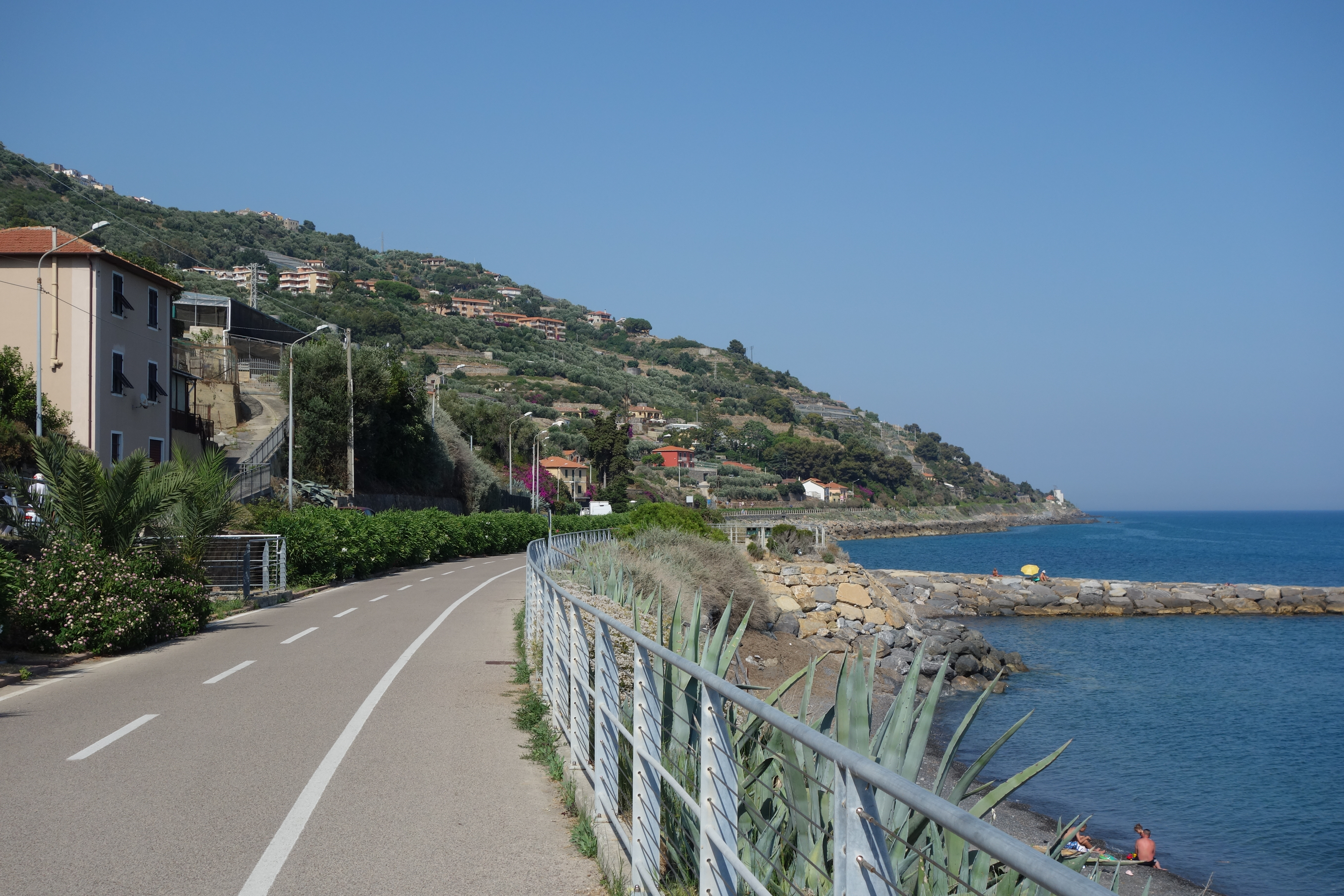
Pista ciclabile in Liguria between San Lorenzo al Mare and Ospedaletti

- Albenga – Passo del Ginestro (71 km) road asphalt
- Albenga – pista ciclabile (1 km) cycle path asphalt
- Albissola – Ellera – Stella – S.Martino di Stella – Alpicella (19 km) road asphalt
- Albissola – San Martino – Varazze (ring route) (33 km) road asphalt
- Alessandria (Piedmont) – Passo del Faiallo (ring route) (133 km) road asphalt
- Arenzano – Cogoleto (3 km) cycle path/pedestrian path mixed surface
- Lerici – Tellaro (7 km) road asphalt
- Pista ciclabile della Riviera Ligure Andorra – Ospedaletti (45 km) cycle path/pedestrian path asphalt

== Healthcare ==
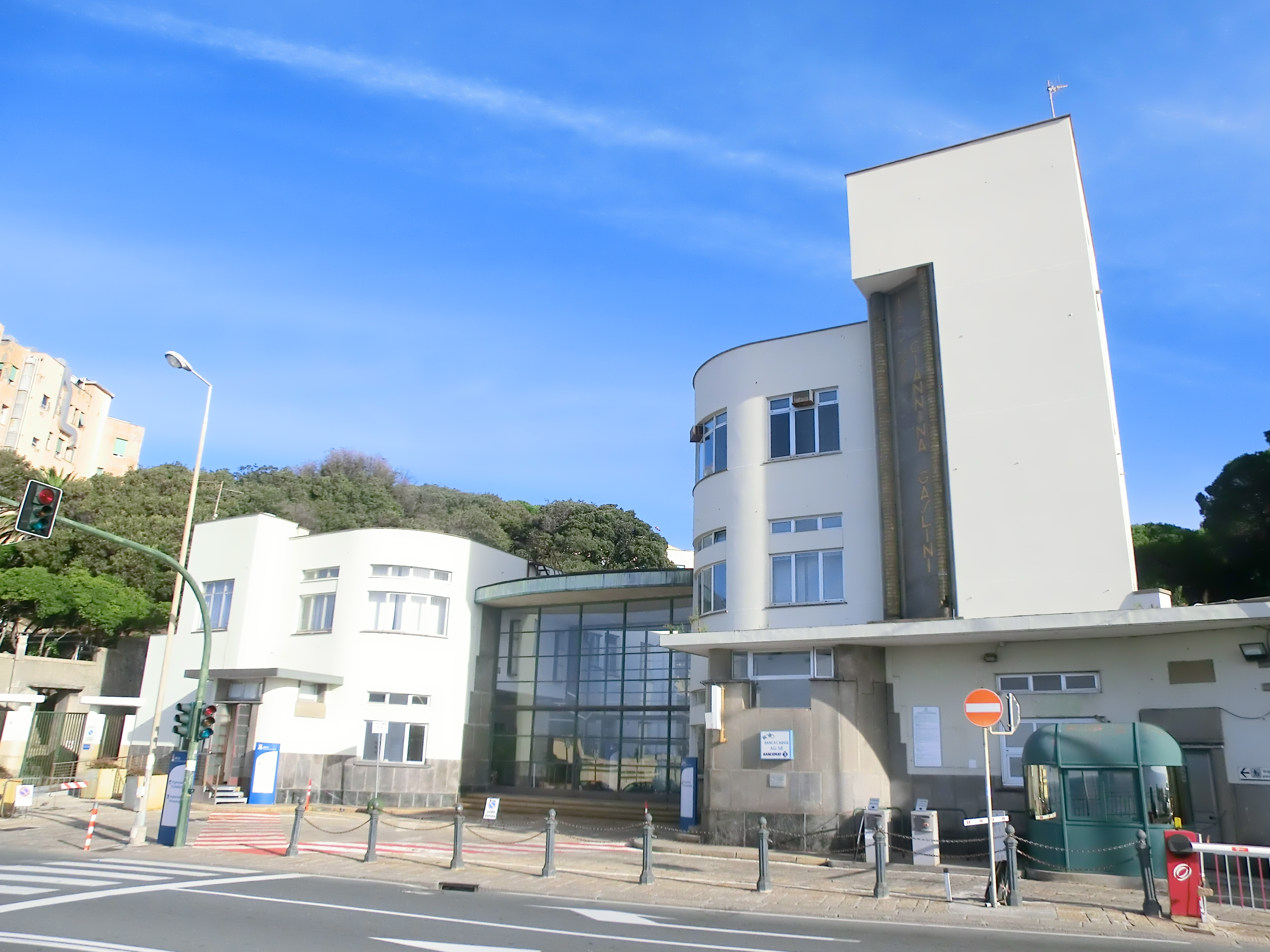
Istituto Giannina Gaslini - Via Gerolamo Gaslini, 5, 16147 Sturla, Genoa

- Sanremo Hospital
- Imperia Hospital
- Santa Maria di Misericordia Hospital, Albenga
- Santa Corona Hospital, Pietra Ligure
- San Paolo Hospital, Savona
- La Colletta Hospital, Arenzano
- Evangelico Hospital, Voltri, Genoa
- Antero Micone Hospital, Sestri Ponente, Genoa
- Villa Scassi Hospital, Sampierdarena, Genoa
- Galliera Hospital, Genoa
- San Martino Hospital, Genoa
- Villa Montallegro Private Clinic, Genoa
- Istituto Giannina Gaslini (Children's hospital), Genoa
- Sant'Antonio Hospital, Recco
- Lavagna Hospital
- Sestri Levante Hospital
- Sant'Andrea Hospital, La Spezia

== Airports ==
- Aeroporto di Genova "Cristoforo Colombo"
- Riviera Airport, Villanova d'Albenga

== Hotels ==
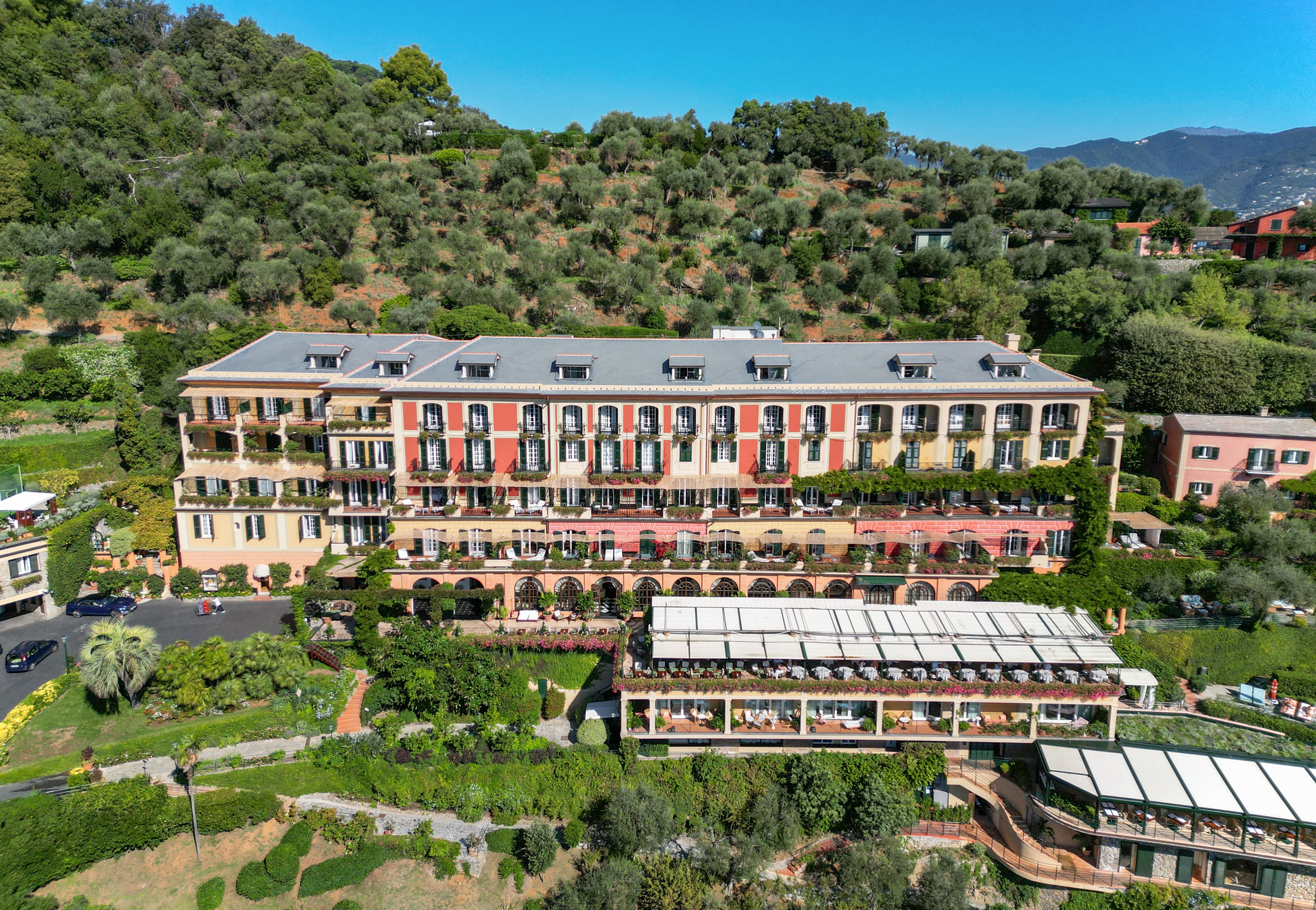
Belmond Hotel Splendido, Portofino

- Hotel Splendido, Portofino
- Imperiale Palace Hotel, Santa Margherita Ligure
- Grand Hotel Miramare, Santa Margherita Ligure
- Villa Gelsomino, Santa Margherita Ligure
- Grand Hotel Arenzano, Arenzano
- Hotel Portofino Kulm, Ruta, Camogli

== Firefighters ==
- Direzione Regionale VV.F. Liguria
  - Comando VV.F. di Genova
    - Distaccamento Aeroportuale di Genova - Aeroporto C. Colombo
    - Distaccamento Cittadino Bolzaneto
    - Distaccamento Cittadino Genova Est "Mario Meloncelli"
    - Distaccamento Cittadino Multedo
    - Distaccamento di Busalla
    - Distaccamento di Chiavari
    - Distaccamento di Rapallo
    - Distaccamento Portuale di Genova Gadda
    - Distaccamento Portuale di Genova Multedo
    - Nucleo Sommozzatori di Genova
    - Reparto Volo di Genova
  - Comando VV.F. di Savona
    - Distaccamento Aeroportuale di Villanova
    - Distaccamento di Albenga
    - Distaccamento di Cairo Montenotte
    - Distaccamento di Finale Ligure
    - Distaccamento di Varazze
    - Distaccamento Portuale di Savona
    - Distaccamento Volontari di Sassello
    - Distaccamento Volontari di Toirano
  - Comando VV.F. di Imperia
    - Distaccamento di Sanremo
    - Distaccamento di Ventimiglia
  - Comando VV.F. di La Spezia
    - Associazione Nazionale VV.F.
    - Distaccamento Distaccamento di Brugnato
    - Distaccamento Distaccamento di Sarzana
    - Distaccamento Distaccamento Portuale di La Spezia Porto
    - Distaccamento Distaccamento Volontari di Levanto
    - Nucleo sommozzatori Nucleo Sommozzatori di La Spezia

== See also ==
- Riviera di Levante
- Riviera di Ponente
- Riviera del Beigua
- Riviera delle Palme (Liguria)
- Riviera dei Fiori
- Riviera Romagnola
- Riviera del Conero
- Riviera delle Palme (Marche)
- Trabocchi Coast
- Amalfi Coast
- Cilento Coast
- Coast of the Gods
- Riviera dei Tramonti
- Costa Smeralda
- Costa Verde (Sardinia)
- Costa Apuana
- Versilia
- Côte d'Azur
- Principality of Monaco
- Costa do Estoril
- Turkish Riviera
- French Riviera
