= Bergeggi (island) =

Island off the coast of Savona, Liguria, Italy

Isola Bergeggi
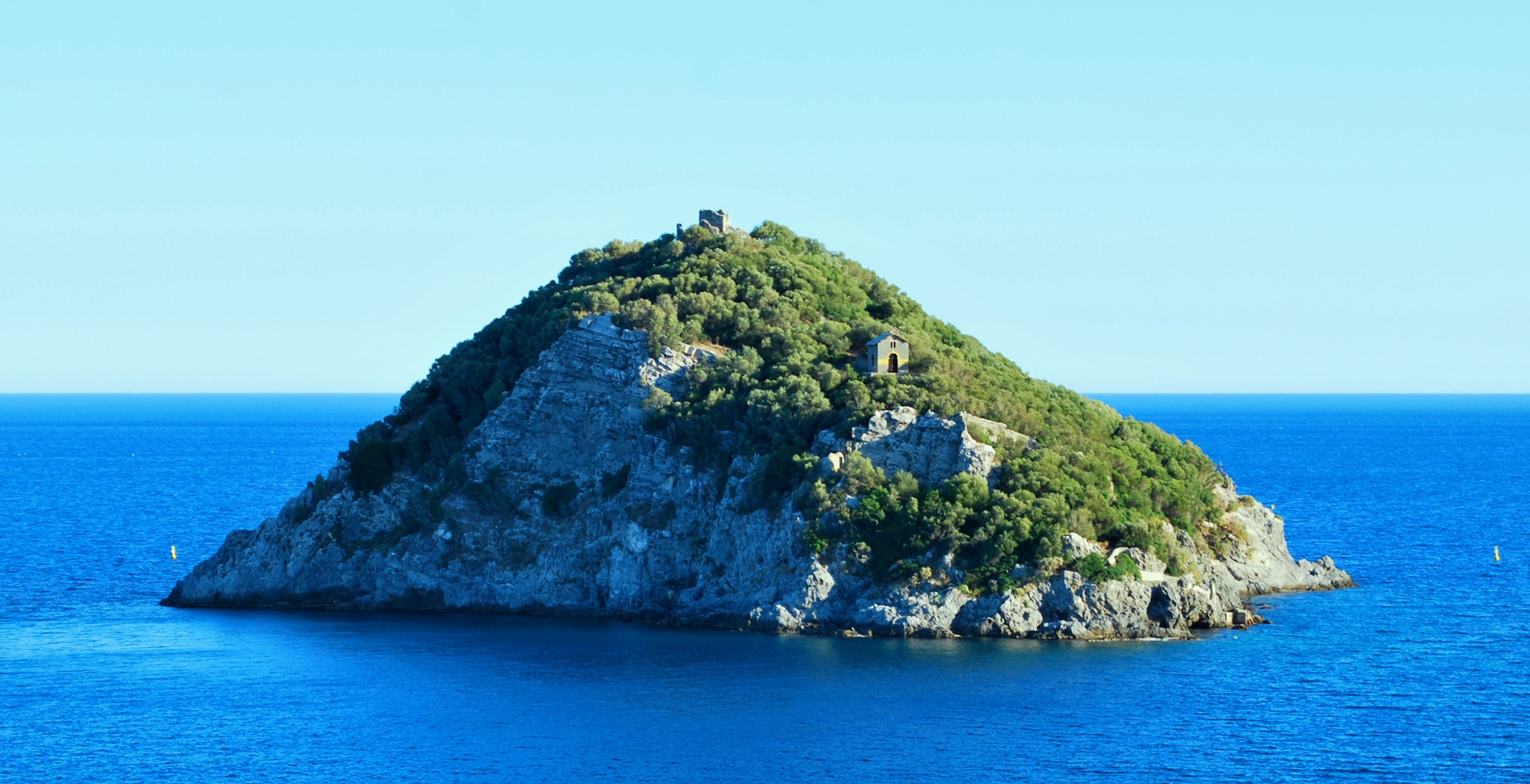
- Interactive map of Isola Bergeggi

Geography
- Location: Ligurian Sea
- Coordinates: 44°14′04″N 8°26′42″E
- Area: 0.08 km^{2} (0.031 sq mi)
- Highest elevation: 53 m (174 ft)

Administration
- Italy
- Region: Liguria
- Province: Savona
- Communes: Bergeggi

Demographics
- Population: 0

Bergeggi is an island which lies in the Ligurian Sea off the coast near the village of Bergeggi in the Province of Savona, Liguria, Italy.

== Geography ==
The island is around 8 hectares and its highest point is at 53 m. Punta Predani, a promontory on the mainland, is just a few hundreds metres from the island.

== History ==
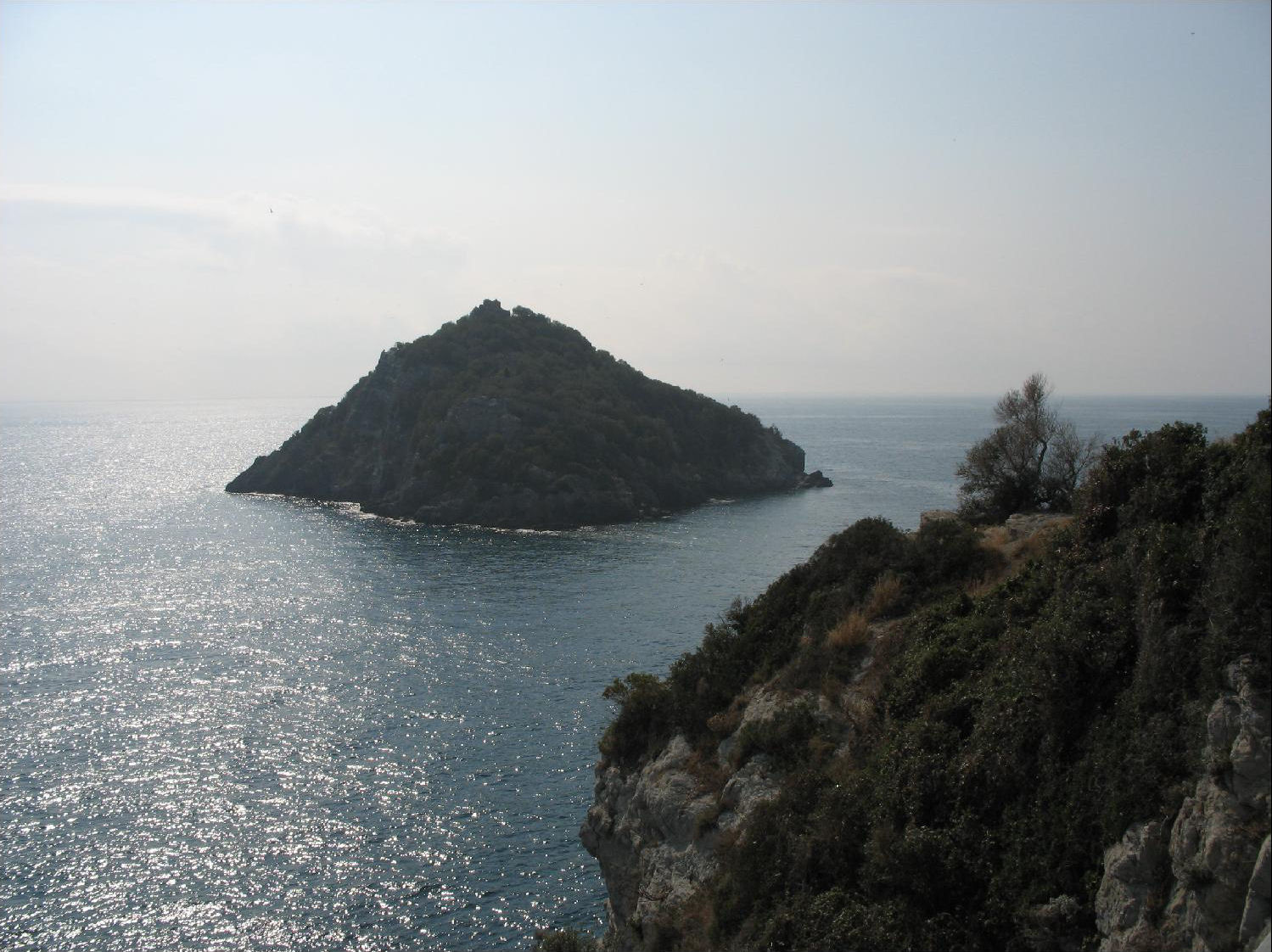
Bergeggi from Punta Predani

The island bears evidences of a proto-historical Ligures' settlement. On its summit stands a watch tower and remains of a 4th-century church devoted to St. Eugenius.

In 992 the bishop of Savona established a monastery on the island, also devoted to the saint, which was later donated to Lérins Abbey's monks. The monastery's ruins are still visible on the island.

== Ecology ==
The island which, along with its surrounding marine area, forms part of the Riserva naturale regionale di Bergeggi ('Bergeggi Regional Nature Reserve'), has a rocky coastline that rises up to 53 meters above sea level.

First protected as a nature reserve in 1985, it is also included in the Isola Bergeggi - Punta Predani European Site of Community Importance (code IT1323202).

Parts of the island are covered by maquis shrubland, in which species such as Campanula sabatia and Euphorbia dendroides can be found, while the supralittoral rocks provide a habitat for plants such as sea fennel and Limonium cordatum.

== Bibliography ==
- Leali Rizzi, Tina. Penco, Adriano. Liguria in blu - Guida alle immersioni subacquee da Ventimiglia a La spezia. Le Mani-Microart'S, 2001. ISBN 88-8012-179-0.
- A.Maestri. Il culto di San Colombano in Italia. Archivio storico di Lodi. 1939 e segg.
- Archivum Bobiense Rivista annuale degli Archivi storici Bobiensi (1979–2008). Bobbio
- Mons. Antonio Giustiniani Annali della Repubblica di Genova Terza Edizione Genovese Vol.1 1854. Genova.
- Attilio Zuccagni-Orlandini Corografia fisica, storica e statistica dell'Italia e delle sue Isole Volume Duodecimo. 1842. Firenze.

== See also ==
- Italian Riviera
- List of islands of Italy
