= Rossese =

Rossese is the name of several Italian wine grape variety including:

- Rossese di Dolceacqua, red wine grape that is also known as Tibouren in the French wine region of Provence. Rossese di Dolceacqua is an Italian DOP wine
- Rossese di Campochiesa, red wine grape that is primarily found in the province of Savona in Liguria
- Rossese bianco, white wine grape that is primarily found in the province of Cuneo in Piedmont
- Rossese bianco di San Biagio, white wine grape that is primarily found in the province of Savona in Liguria
- Rossese bianco di Monforte, white wine grape that is primarily found in the province of Cuneo in Piedmont
- Ruzzese, white wine grape that is also known as Rossese bianco in the province of La Spezia in Liguria
- Grillo, white wine grape that is also known as Rossese bianco in the province of La Spezia in Liguria
