= Portofino Lighthouse =

Portofino
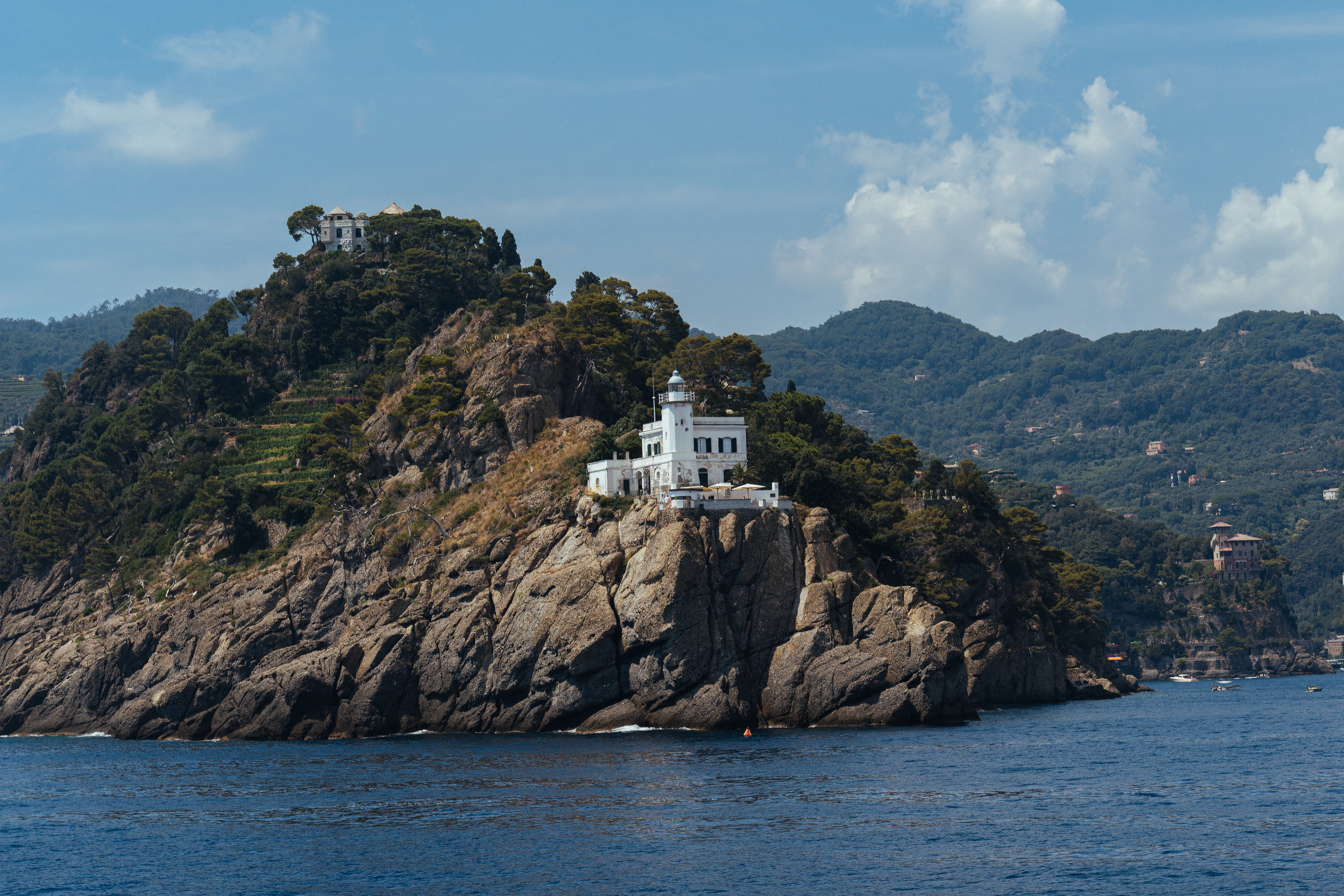
- Portofino Lighthouse
- Location: Portofino; Liguria; Italy
- Coordinates: 44°17′55″N 9°13′06″E

Tower
- Constructed: 1917
- Construction: masonry tower
- Height: 12 metres (39 ft)
- Shape: quadrangular tower with balcony and lantern attached to the front keeper’s house
- Markings: white tower, grey metallic lantern dome
- Operator: Marina Militare

Light
- Focal height: 40 metres (130 ft)
- Lens: Type TD 375 focal length: 187.5 mm
- Light source: main power
- Intensity: main: AL 1000 W reserve: LABI 100 W
- Range: main:16 nautical miles (30 km; 18 mi) reserve: 11 nautical miles (20 km; 13 mi)
- Characteristic: Fl W 5s.
- Italy no.: 1675 E.F.

Portofino Lighthouse (Italian: Faro di Portofino) is an active lighthouse located in Portofino, Metropolitan City of Genoa, Liguria, northern Italy, on the western extremity of the peninsula in the Gulf of Tigullio.

== Description ==
The lighthouse was built in 1917 and consists of a white quadrangular tower, 12 feet (3.7 m) high, with balcony and lantern, attached to a 2-storey white keeper's house. The lantern, painted in grey metallic, is positioned at 40 metres (130 ft) above sea level and emits one white flash in a 5-second period, visible up to a distance of 16 nautical miles (30 km; 18 mi). The lighthouse is completely automated, powered by a solar unit and is operated by the Marina Militare with the identification code number 1675 E.F.

== See also ==
- List of lighthouses in Italy
- Portofino
