= Bergeggi =

- Comune
- Comune di Bergeggi

- Location within Italy Location within Liguria
- Coordinates: 44°14.81′N 8°26.52′E
- Country: Italy
- Region: Liguria
- Province: Savona (SV)

Government
  - Mayor: Roberto Arboscello

Area
  - Total: 3.69 km^{2} (1.42 sq mi)
- Elevation: 110 m (360 ft)

Population (30 April 2017)
  - Total: 1,133
  - Density: 307/km^{2} (795/sq mi)
- Demonym: Bergeggini
- Time zone: UTC+1 (CET)
  - Summer (DST): UTC+2 (CEST)
- Postal code: 17028
- Dialing code: 019
- Patron saint: Saint Martin
- Saint day: 11 November
- Website: Official website

Bergeggi (Ligurian: Berzezzi) is a comune (municipality) in the Province of Savona in the Italian region Liguria, located about 90 kilometres (56 mi) southwest of Genoa and about 10 kilometres (6 mi) southwest of Savona.
