= Palio del Golfo =

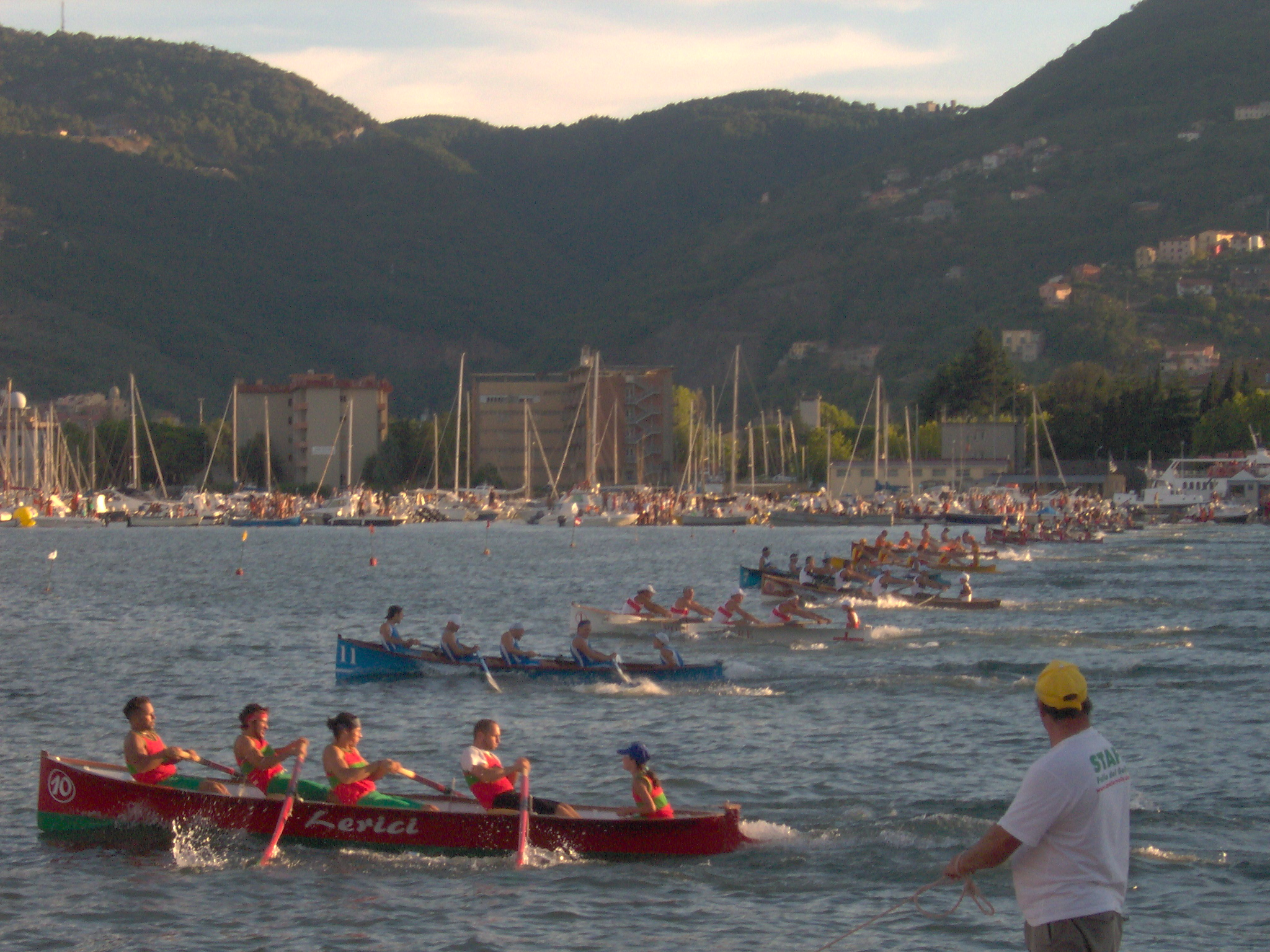
- La Spezia - The start of the 81st Palio del Golfo (2006)
- Status: active
- Date: early August
- Frequency: annual
- Location: La Spezia
- Country: Italy
- Inaugurated: 1932; 94 years ago
- Most recent: 2 august 2026
- Next event: August 2027
- Organiser: Comune di La Spezia
- Website: Palio del Golfo

The Palio del Golfo is a rowing challenge that is held every year, on the first Sunday of August, in the sea of the Gulf of La Spezia.

According to reports of the time, a similar event had already taken place as early as 1878 on the occasion of the launching of the battleship Regia Nave Dandolo.

The Palio was held for the first time in 1925, when the coastal towns of the gulf competed in a rowing race using boats used for sea fishing.

Looking back at the origins of the challenge, the traditional regatta was nothing more than a competition among the crews of boats loaded with fish or mussels. Therefore, it was not a true sporting event, but rather a commercial competition of sorts: whoever returned first to the port market would presumably make higher profits compared to the boats arriving later.

It was only from 1934 onwards that purpose-built hulls designed specifically for the race began to be used, replacing the traditional gozzi used for fishing.

In 1945, the Palio del Golfo was held in San Terenzo because La Spezia's Morin Promenade and the surrounding area were impassable following the heavy bombings suffered during World War II. On that occasion, it was the village of San Terenzo itself that claimed victory for the first time in its history.

The 2020 edition was canceled due to the global COVID-19 pandemic.

== The Thirteen borgate ==
- Porto Venere
- Le Grazie
- Fezzano
- Cadimare
- Marola
- La Spezia Centro
- Canaletto
- Fossamastra
- Muggiano
- San Terenzo
- Venere Azzurra
- Lerici
- Tellaro

== Winners ==
Edition	Year	Winner
76	2001	Marola
77	2002	Marola
78	2003	Marola
79	2004	Fezzano
80	2005	Marola
81	2006	Marola
82	2007	Cadimare
83	2008	Muggiano
84	2009	Canaletto
85	2010	Cadimare
86	2011	Muggiano
87	2012	Lerici
88	2013	Marola
89	2014	Le Grazie
90	2015	Fezzano
91	2016	Marola
92	2017	Lerici
93	2018	Fezzano
94	2019	Cadimare
95	2020	Cancelled due to the COVID-19 pandemic
96	2021	Fossamastra
97	2022	Fezzano
98	2023	Fezzano
99	2024	Muggiano
100	2025	Canaletto
101	2026	Porto Venere

== See also ==
- Regatta of the Historical Marine Republics
- Palio Marinaro di San Pietro
