= Palio Marinaro di San Pietro =

- Status: active
- Genre: sports event
- Date: early July
- Frequency: annual
- Location: Genoa
- Country: Italy
- Inaugurated: 1955; 71 years ago
- Most recent: 2 July 2023
- Previous event: 2–3 July 2022
- Next event: 2024
- Organiser: Federazione Italiana Canottaggio Sedile Fisso (FICSF); Comune di Genova

The Palio Marinaro di San Pietro is a sporting event of historical re-enactment, established in 1955.

== History ==
The Palio founded in 1955 just like the Regatta of the Historical Marine Republics.

The Comune of Genoa equipped each of the coastal districts with a 22-palm regatta goiter boat, made of mahogany and cedar wood from Ligurian shipyards: there were 12, about 6.5 meters long and weighing about 300 kilograms, distinguished by a subsequent number, from Ponente to Levante. For each goiter boat there was a crew, strictly of the own rione, consisting of four rowers and a helmsman who guided the boat in the wake, or rowing standing up with two oars. The Sunday of the event, established each year, was the one immediately preceding or following the feast of San Peter and Paul.

There are 12 rioni that challenge in the regatta: Sant'Ilario (Purple), Nervi (Orange), Quinto (Light blue), Quarto (Gray), Sturla (Yellow), Vernazzola (Dark blue), Foce (Red / Blue ), Centro Storico (White / Yellow), Dinegro (White / Blue), Sampierdarena (White / Green), Sestri Pontente (White / Black) and Voltri (Green).

In origin, the Palio took place in the sea water space in front of the Foce beach, then very large, next to the church of San Pietro dedicated to the patron saint of fishermen. Subsequently, the construction of Piazzale Kennedy caused the competition venue to migrate to the waters in front of the San Nazaro bathing establishment. In 1986 the wooden goiters were replaced by the current 5.5 meters long fiberglass goiters and weighing about 200 kilograms.

== The twelve rioni ==
- Sant'Ilario (Purple)
- Nervi (Orange)
- Quinto (Light blue)
- Quarto (Gray)
- Sturla (Yellow)
- Vernazzola (Dark blue)
- Foce (Red / Blue)
- Centro Storico (White / Yellow)
- Dinegro (White / Blue)
- Sampierdarena (White / Green)
- Sestri Pontente (White / Black)
- Voltri (Green)

== The historical parade ==
The historic parade is scheduled on the Saturday preceding Sunday's race.

== The race ==
The Palio takes place in the stretch of sea in front of the church of San Pietro at Foce, a district of Genoa. The fiberglass goiters have a crew of four rowers and a coxswain in the race.

On 3 July 2022, only seven Genoese rioni: Sant'Ilario-Capolungo (purple), Nervi (orange), Quinto (light blue), Sturla-Vernazzola (blue), Foce (blue and red), Sestri Ponente (black and white) and Voltri (green) raced in the 62nd Palio Marinaro di San Pietro covering 1 nautical mile, composed of 6 turning points.

== The seven rioni ==
- Sant'Ilario-Capolungo
- Nervi
- Quinto
- Sturla-Vernazzola
- Foce
- Sestri Ponente
- Voltri

== The trophy ==
The trophy Andrea Doria awarded the winning crew is a reproduction of the ancient door-knocker represent Neptune, from the Palazzo del Principe's northern entrance.

== Winners ==
Edition	Year	Winner
47	2002	Quinto
48	2003	Sestri Ponente
49	2004	Sestri Ponente
50	2005	Sampierdarena
51	2006	Quinto
52	2007	Quinto
53	2008	Nervi
54	2009	Quinto
55	2010	Voltri
56	2011	Sturla-Vernazzola
57	2012	Voltri
58	2013	Voltri
59	2014	Voltri
60	2015	Sturla-Vernazzola
61	2016	Sturla-Vernazzola
62	2022	Nervi
63	2023	Nervi

== See also ==
- Regatta of the Historical Marine Republics
- Palio del Golfo
