= Punta Santa Teresa Lighthouse =

Punta Santa Teresa
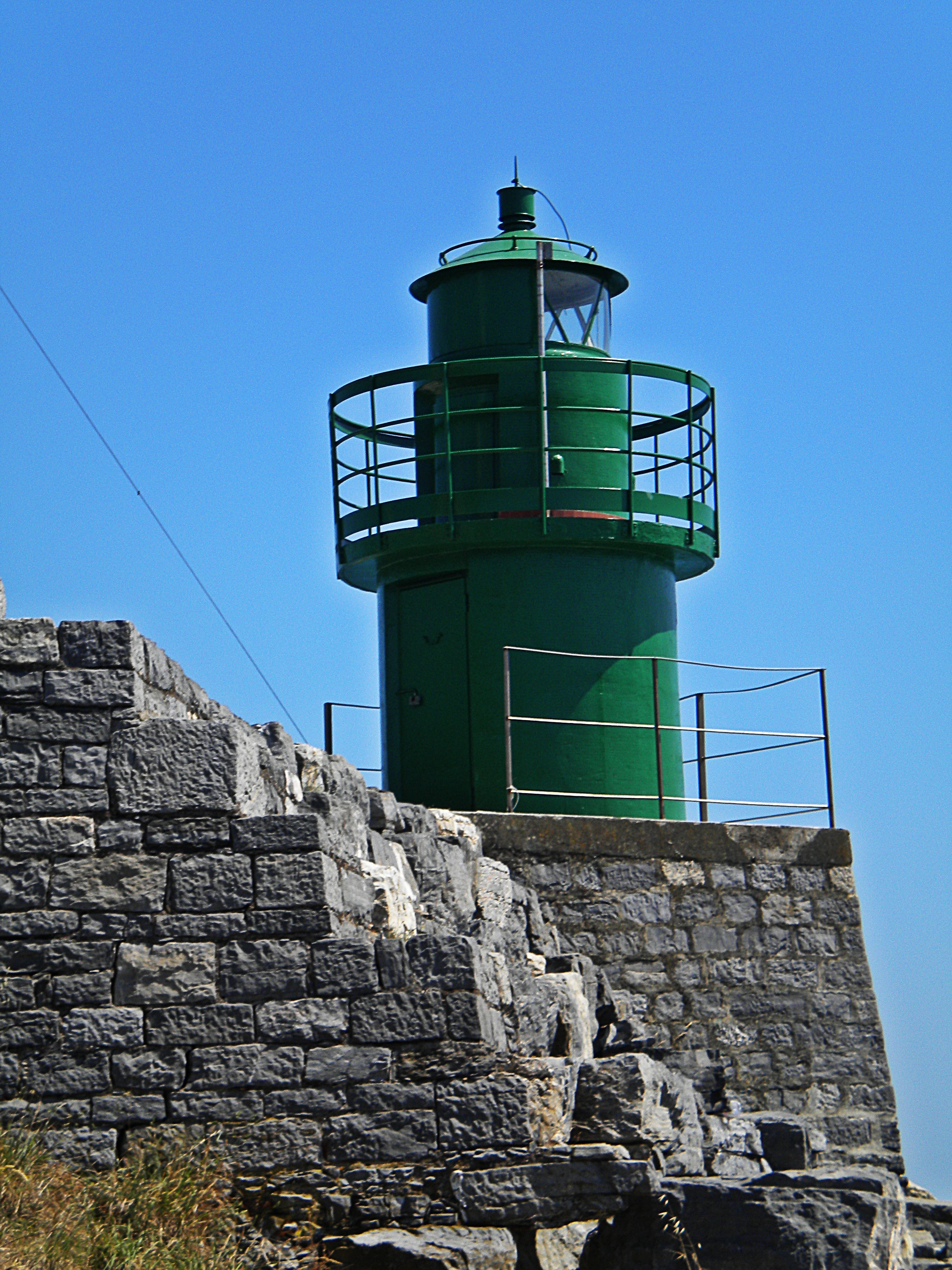
- Punta Santa Teresa Lighthouse
- Location: Lerici; Liguria; Italy
- Coordinates: 44°04′52″N 9°52′52″E

Tower
- Foundation: concrete base
- Construction: metal tower
- Automated: yes
- Height: 5 metres (16 ft)
- Shape: cylindrical tower with balcony and lantern
- Markings: green tower and lantern
- Power source: solar power
- Operator: Marina Militare

Light
- Focal height: 10 metres (33 ft)
- Lens: Type TD
- Intensity: Maxi Halo-60
- Range: 8 nautical miles (15 km; 9.2 mi)
- Characteristic: Fl (2) G 6s.
- Italy no.: 1745 E.F.

Punta Santa Teresa Lighthouse (Italian: Faro di Punta Santa Teresa) is an active lighthouse located at the east side, opposite to the outer breakwater of the gulf of La Spezia, in the municipality of Lerici, Liguria on the Ligurian Sea.

== Description ==
The lighthouse consists of a green metal cylindrical tower, 5 feet (1.5 m) high, with balcony and lantern. The lantern, painted in green, is positioned at 10 metres (33 ft) above sea level and emits two green flashes in a 6 seconds period. The lighthouse is powered by a solar unit and is completely automated and operated by the Marina Militare with the identification code number 1745 E.F.

== See also ==
- List of lighthouses in Italy
