= GO 58 =

History

Italy
- Name: GO 58
- Builder: Cantiere Navale Navalmare Srl Muggiano (La Spezia)
- Launched: 1996
- Commissioned: 1996
- In service: 1
- Homeport: Augusta

General characteristics
- Type: Floating dry dock
- Length: - 105.00 m (344 ft 6 in) LOA; - working length = 95.00 m (311 ft 8 in)
- Beam: - 23.0 m (75 ft 6 in); - working beam = 17.5 m (57 ft 5 in)
- Draught: 8.6 m (28 ft 3 in) (max)
- Draft: 10.1 m (33 ft 2 in) (max)
- Notes: lifting capability 2.000 t (1.968 long tons)

GO 58 is a Floating dry dock of the Marina Militare.
