= Tellaro =

Village in Liguria, Italy

Coordinates: 44°03′35″N 9°55′45″E

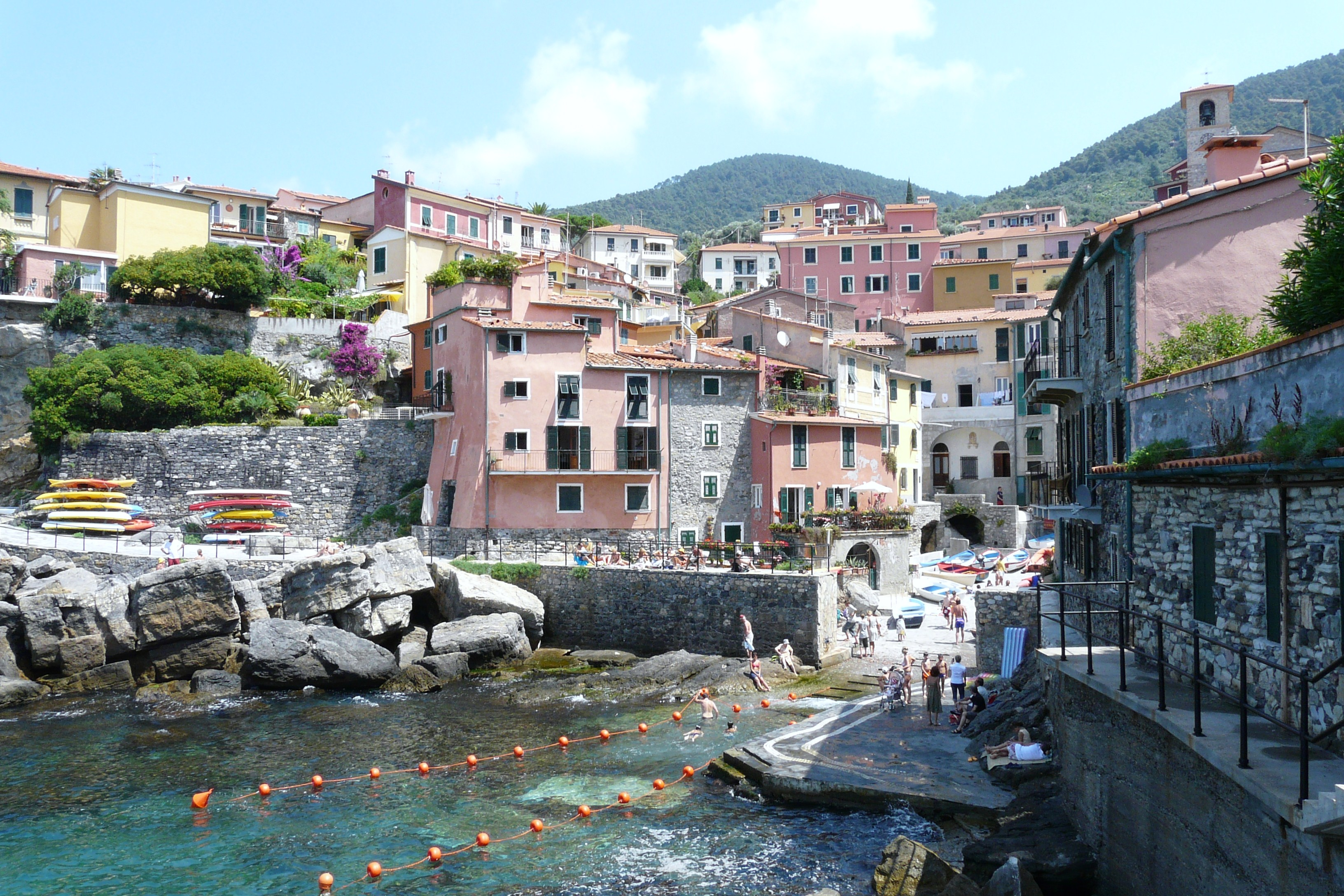
View from the church at Tellaro

Tellaro is a small fishing village, perched on a cliff on the east coast of the Gulf of La Spezia in Liguria, northern Italy. It is a frazione of the comune (municipality) of Lerici. It is one of I Borghi più belli d'Italia ("The most beautiful villages of Italy").

Tellaro has been the destination for many Italian and foreign artists. Mario Soldati made it his home in the last years of his life. Tellaro is one of the seaside villages that annually participate in the Palio del Golfo, an annual boat race held in the gulf of La Spezia.

== History ==
- 1152: Tellora and Lerici are part of the Republic of Genoa.
- The church of Saint George (named after the Christian matyr who triumphed over the dragon) was built between 1564 and 1584 as a fortification for the town to help protect against the constant incursions of the Saracens, the Catalans and local raiders.

== Culture ==
Among the festivals of particular interest is the underwater Christmas celebrating the birth of Jesus on Christmas night. Every year the statue of the baby Jesus emerges from the water carried by a group of divers and placed in the manger, in a setting of over 8,000 candles and celebrated by fireworks over the sea. The patron saint of Tellaro is St. George, which is celebrated on the 23rd of April. The "Festival of the Octopus", which takes place every year on the second Sunday in August, organized by the Unione Sportiva active in the Ligurian village.

There are many legends about Tellaro. The most famous tells the story an attack by Saracen pirates in the Middle Ages. The village was saved by a giant octopus that warned the population by climbing up the church tower and ringing the bells.

== Popular culture ==
The 2021 animated film Luca was primarily based on the nearby Cinque Terre towns, however the Pixar animation team visited Tellaro in addition and drew inspiration from it for the film.
