= Regatta of the Historical Marine Republics =

Traditional Italian sporting event

Regatta of the Historical Maritime Republics
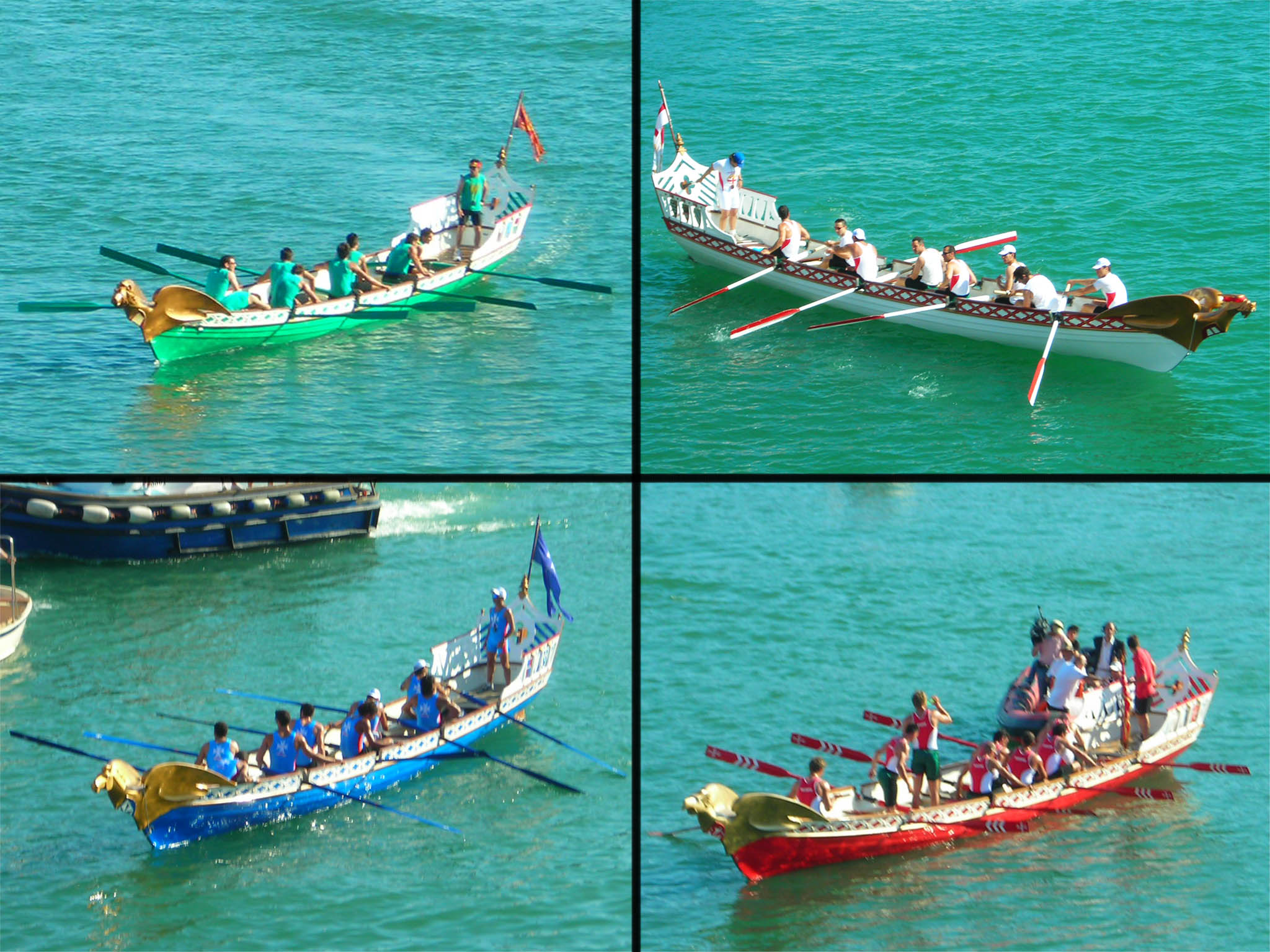
- The four vessels of the regatta. From the top to the left, clockwise, Venice, Genoa, Pisa and Amalfi
- Status: active
- Genre: historical reenactment and sports event
- Date: late May–early July
- Frequency: annual
- Locations: Venice, Genoa, Pisa and Amalfi
- Country: Italy
- Inaugurated: 1955; 71 years ago
- Most recent: 2 June 2026 (Pisa)
- Next event: 2027 (Venice)
- Attendance: 200,000
- Website: https://www.repubblichemarinare.org

Regatta of the Historical Maritime Republics
- Flag of the Italian Navy, displaying the coat of arms of the best known maritime republics (clockwise from the upper left): Venice, Genoa, Pisa, and Amalfi
- Sport: Regatta
- Founded: 1955 (71 years ago)
- Country: Italy
- Continent: Europe
- Most recent champion: Venice (35th title)
- Most titles: Venice (35 titles)

The Regatta of the Historical Maritime Republics (or Palio of the Historical Maritime Republics) is a sporting event of historical re-enactment. It was first established in 1955, with the aim of recalling the rivalry of the most famous Italian maritime republics: those of Republic of Amalfi, Republic of Pisa, Republic of Genoa and Republic of Venice, during which four rowing crews representing each of the republics compete against each other. This event, held under the patronage of the President of the Italian Republic, takes place every year on a day between the end of May and the beginning of July, and is hosted in rotation between these cities. The regatta is preceded by a historical procession, during which parade through the streets of the city organizing some figures that play the role of ancient characters that characterized each republic.

On October 13, 2024, the historic regatta with an all-female crew was held in Genoa for the first time. It is considered the first edition of this new format of the historic regatta, which was won by both Genoese crews.

== History ==
The idea of an event reminiscent of the events of the four seafaring powers of the Middle Ages was born in the late 1940s by the Pisan knight Mirro Chiaverini. The proposal was first viewed by Carlo Vallini, president of the Provincial Tourist Board of Pisa, who, after having accepted it, turned it in turn to the municipalities of the other three cities to participate. The initiative was welcomed in a positive way especially by the lawyer Francesco Amodio, then mayor of Amalfi, who requested (and obtained) a meeting of representatives of the four cities involved to examine the proposal together. The meeting took place at the Pisa palace on April 9, 1949, but the agreement was not simple: during the discussion, Mr. Manzini, director of the Venice municipal office, showed his opinion against the participation of the tender rowing of the lagoon city, while being in favor of the parade in the historical parade. The lawyer Amodio tried, in his speech in defense of the regatta, to change his mind, underlining the importance not only historical but also tourism of the event. Given the strong agreement by Amalfi, Pisa and Genoa, the representatives of Venice took note of it and also joined the initiative.

Once the agreement was reached, there was a long process, in which the statute and the regulations were established, research was carried out in the historical archives and among the works of art the necessary elements to realize the costumes of the historical procession, the projects were designed of the boats and found the necessary funds to organize the regatta. On June 29, 1955 an experimental test was carried out in Genoa with "gozzi" to four rowers. On December 10 of the same year it was instead signed in Amalfi, in the Salone Morelli (the current Historical Museum of Palazzo San Benedetto, seat of the Town Hall), the constitutive act that sanctioned the creation of the Organizing Body of the Regatta. The boats, built by the Gondolieri Cooperative of Venice, were launched on June 9, 1956 on the Riva dei Giardini Reali, with the blessing of the Patriarch of Venice Angelo Roncalli (later elected Pope John XXIII). The first edition took place in Pisa on July 1 of that year; among those present stood out in particular the President of the Republic Giovanni Gronchi and the Minister of Merchant Navy Gennaro Cassiani.

== The statute ==
The Regatta provides a statute, which establishes the constitution of the organization, its purpose (that is to promote the event itself), and its composition. According to this statute, the Body consists of three parts: the Magistrates of the Regatta, the General Committee and the City Committee. The first part is the supreme body of the Entity, composed of the mayors of the four seafaring cities, whose office as First Magistrate is entitled to the mayor of the city hosting the event; the second is the collegiate technical-administrative body, whose chairman (who is in turn the president of the Citizen Committee of the host city) legally represents the Entity; the third is the technical body, appointed by the mayor and in office for four years, which provides for the conduct of the event.

== The regulation ==
Despite having undergone small changes over time, the regulation of the Regatta remained essentially unchanged. Four crews take part in the race, each consisting of 8 rowers and one helmsman, more than the reserves. Previously the crews were trained by athletes born in the respective cities, provinces and regions, or there have been residents for at least ten years, but since 2004 it has been established that they must be composed half by athletes from the Region and for the other half by athletes from the Province.

Boats must be built with the same structural parameters. Before departure, they are weighed, and to be admitted they must not have (weighing less than 760 kilograms) (empty and including accessories, except for oars). Precisely to ensure greater efficiency and lightness in the water (while still within the limits), the boats, once built of wood, today are made of fiberglass. The four original galleons were designed built by Giovanni Giuponi. Each boat must be recognizable by the colors with which it is painted and by polene, or wooden sculptures (now also in fiberglass) placed on the bow that depict the animal symbol of each city, designed over the years Fifty from Professor Alvio Vaglini. For this reason, the Amalfi boat is identified by the color azure and the winged horse, the one of Genoa with the color white and the dragon ( which refers to Saint George, protector of the city), that of Pisa from the color red and from the eagle (which symbolizes the ancient bond between the Pisan Republic and the Holy Roman Empire) and that of Venice from the color green and the winged lion (which refers to Saint Mark the Evangelist, patron of the city).

The Regatta takes place on a 2 kilometer route, which differs depending on the location: in Amalfi it rests in the Tyrrhenian Sea along the coast, in Genoa in the Ligurian Sea within the port basin, in Pisa in the Arno River against the current and in Venice in the characteristic lagoon on the Adriatic Sea. Before the start of the rowing race the lanes are drawn. The starting device consists of four fixed anchors aligned and the way is given by the referee judge. The jury, however, assesses the arrival, judging the "cut" of the finish by the polena of each boat (for Amalfi the tip of the front hoof of the winged horse, for Genoa the tip of the nymphs of the griffin for Pisa, the extremity of the eagle's claws, for Venice half the sword held by the winged lion). During the race, it is forbidden to invade the lane of an opponent, under penalty of relegation to the last place decreed by the jury. On the other hand, it is allowed to change the water number only if a crew takes a boat ahead of an opponent.

The winner of the Regata receives a trophy in gold and silver, made by the Florentine Goldsmith School, which represents a rowing galleon (like the one used for the race) supported by four hippocampus (mythology) below which the coats of arms of the four Maritime Republics appear. It holds it for a year, until the new raffling in the next edition. On the basis of the trophy, moreover, a medal with the symbol of the winning city of the Regatta is affixed from year to year; therefore there are as many medals as many disputed editions.

== The historical parade ==
Historical procession of the Ancient Maritime Republics

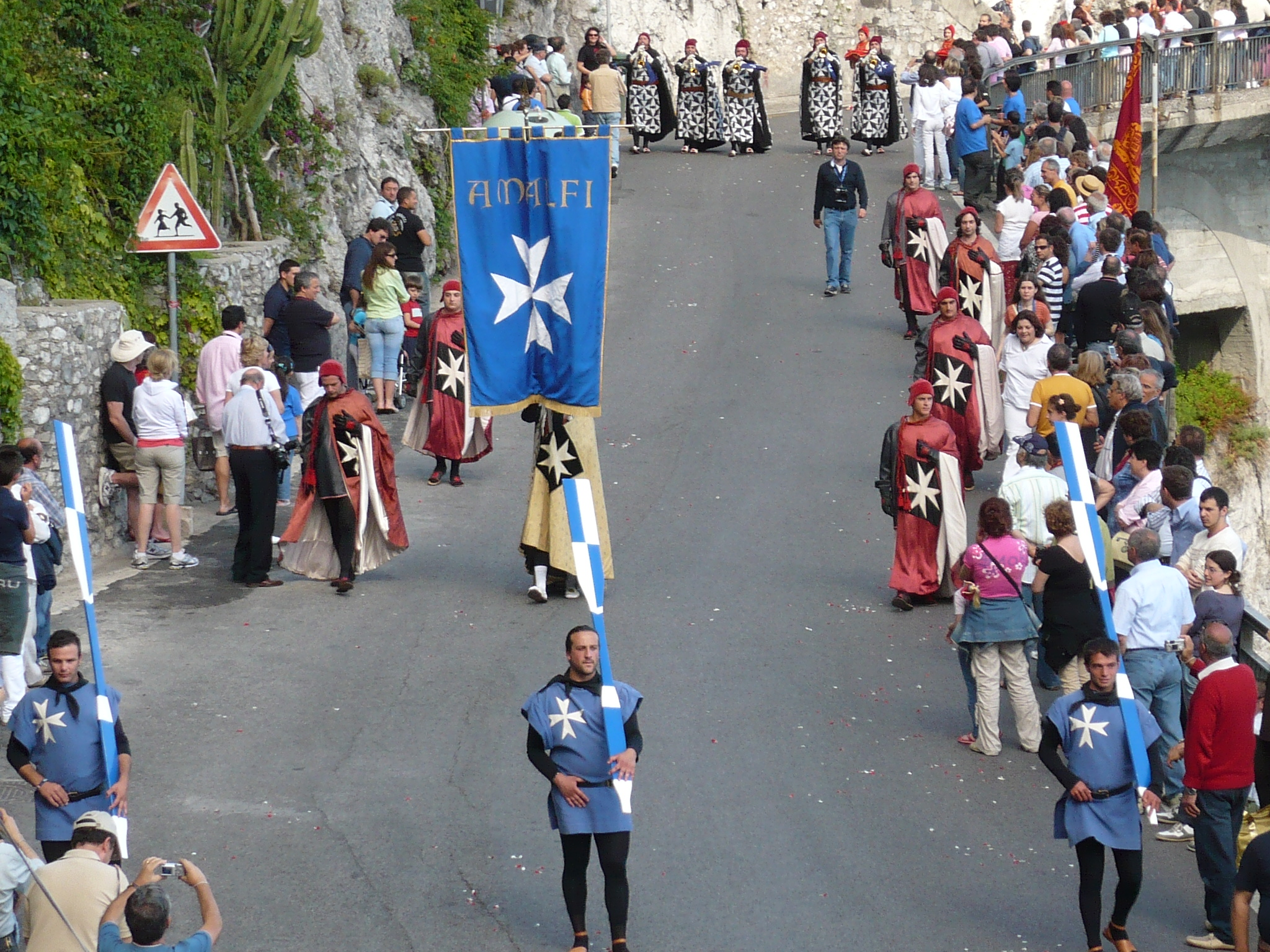
Amalfi

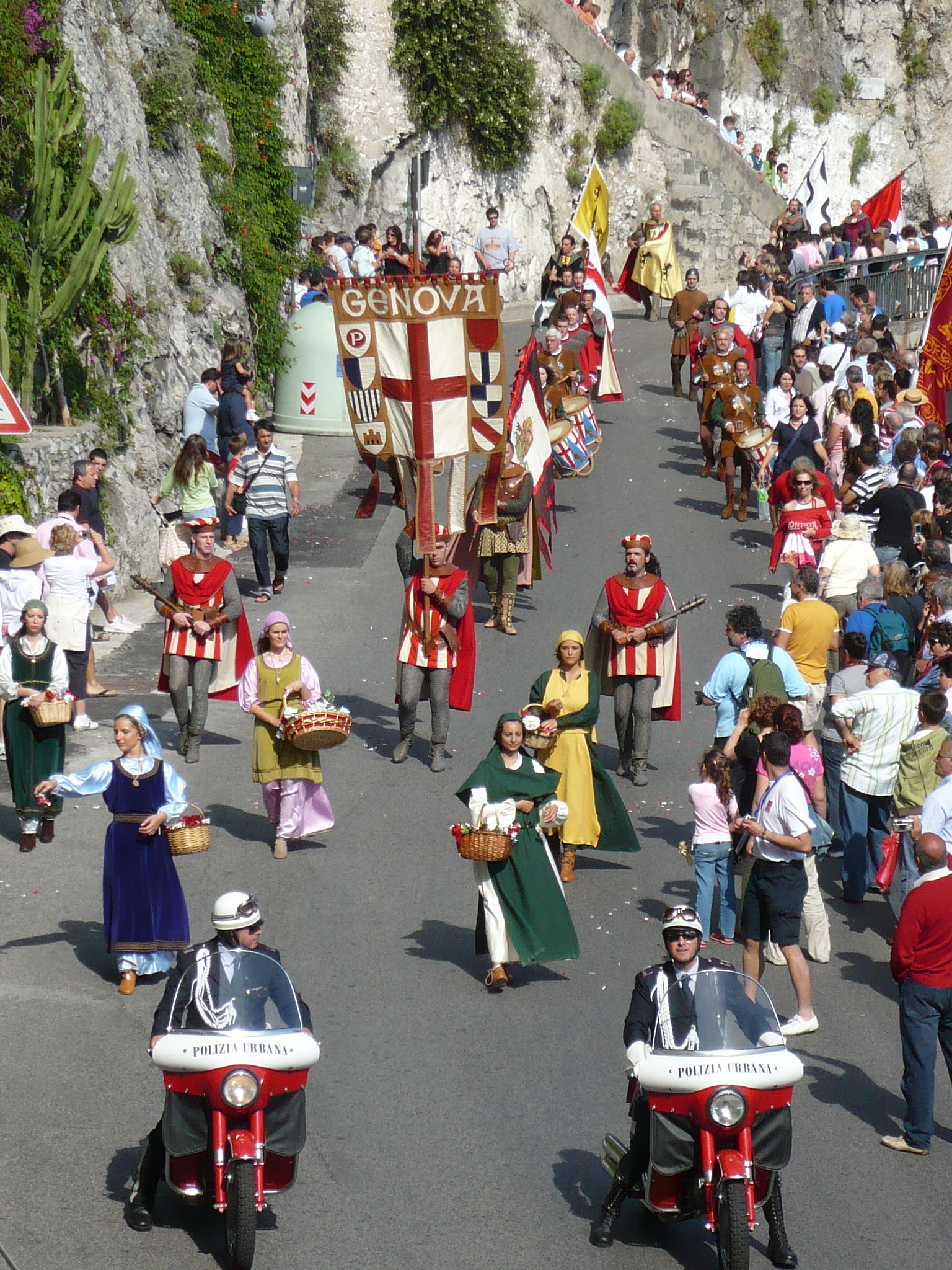
Genoa

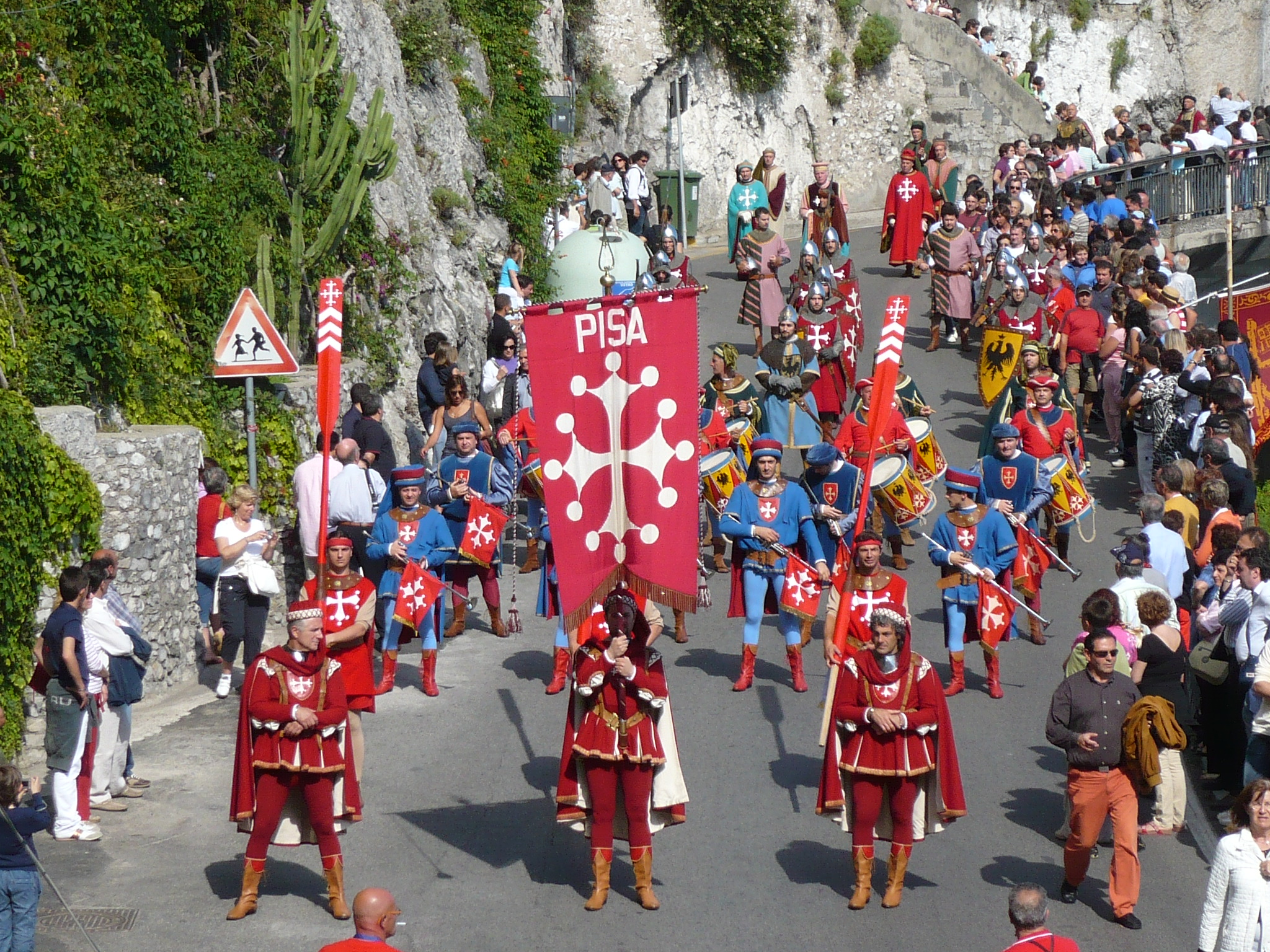
Pisa

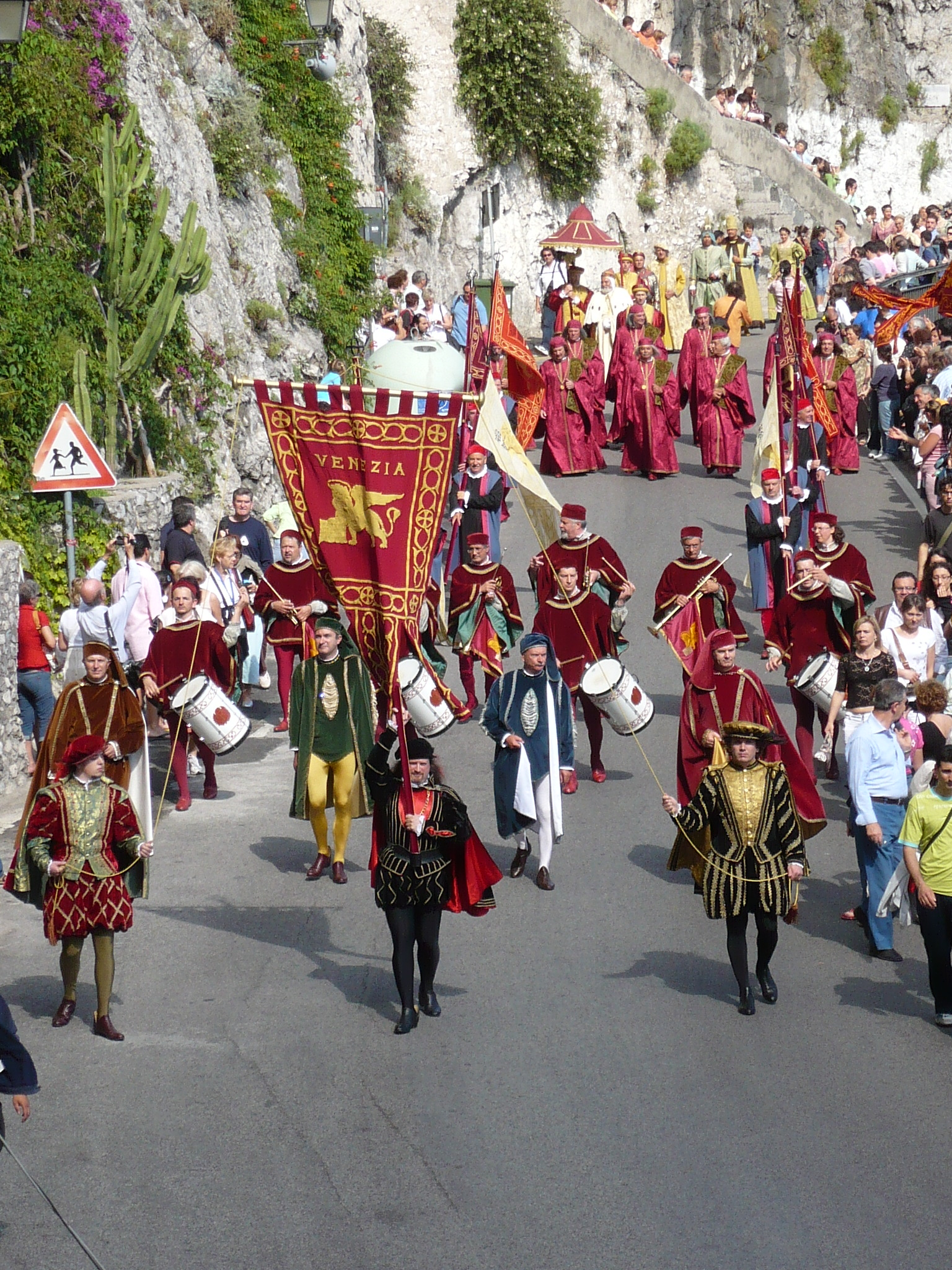
Venice

The historical parade is the central moment of the whole event. Through it every Maritime Republic fully revives its glorious past, proposing episodes and characters that marked its history. The parade has also occasionally marched abroad, in particular in Berlin and New York City.

=== Amalfi ===
The Amalfi procession represents the society of the Campania Republic at the beginning of the eleventh century, when it reached its peak. Inside there are representatives of the various social classes: the magistrates, the military and the people. In particular parade the duke (the highest city authority) and the knights with sword, whose vestments were later taken by members of the Order of the Knights of St. John of Jerusalem. The proposed episode is that of the marriage between John I, son and co-regent of the Duke Mansone I, and the regal salernitan noblewoman; the marriage marked for the young the passage to the adult age and entry into the political environment. The costumes for the Amalfi procession were designed in the fifties by the scenographer Roberto Scielzo, through analysis of historical sources. The realization boxes, as well as the clothes, are still exhibited in the Municipal Museum of the Amalfi Town Hall.

The layout of the parade is as follows: 3 rowers; 10 valets and the gonfalonier; 5 trumpeters; the consul of the Republic; 3 pages of the console; 2 judges; the sea console; 2 ambassadors; the Duke; 2 pages of the duke; 4 riders; 6 bearers; 4 ladies and 4 knights of the court; the groom and the bride; 6 pages; 4 tympanists; the navarca; 9 sailors; 9 archers.

=== Genoa ===
The Genoese procession proposes the consular period of the Ligurian Republic, or rather before the taking of power by the doges. The episode depicted stars the leader Guglielmo Embriaco, nicknamed "Testa di maglio", who led the fleet of Genoa during the First Crusade. At that time he brought to Genoa the Holy Catino which, according to tradition, would be used by Jesus and the Apostles during the Last Supper. Another important character present in the parade is Caffaro di Caschifellone, the annalist who reported the deeds of the Embriaco. There are also representatives of the social classes: merchants, men of arms and the people.

The layout of the parade is as follows: 1 gonfalonier and 2 mace bearers; 3 bishops; 3 captains; the standard bearer with the flag of Saint George; 6 trumpeters; the bishop with the flag of Genoa; 6 tambourines; 1 armed with a broadsword; 3 washstand; the standard bearer with the flag of the Embriaco; the embroiderer's fingerboard page; the Embriaco; 3 bishops; 3 captains; the Caffaro; 3 armed with a sword; 8 nobles and 8 noblewomen; 2 crossbowmen; 12 people and commoners; 2 crossbowmen; 3 rowers; 6 armed with lance.

=== Pisa ===
The Pisan procession recalls some salient episodes in the history of the Alfea republic; among these, the feat of the heroine Kinzica de' Sismondi stands out, who in 1004 saved the city from a Saracen attack. Also present are the various leaders who followed one another in the government of Pisa (the consuls, the podestà, the captain of the people), as well as the soldiers (on whose insignia appears the black eagle, symbol of the Empire), the sailors, the trumpeters and timpanists.

The arrangement of the procession is as follows: the banner holder; the escort of the banner (2 people); 3 parade rowers; 8 buglers; 1 sergeant; 12 infantry; 3 families; the mayor; 1 groom; the captain of the judges; 2 senators; 2 seniors; the ambassador; the captain of the people; 1 groom; the consul of the merchants; 2 priors of the Seven Arts; 8 drummers; 4 bishops; Kinzica de' Sismondi on horseback; 1 groom; 6 Kinzica bridesmaids; the Admiral of the Fleet; 2 consuls of the sea; 1 patron; 2 committees; 12 sailors. In Amalfi, on the occasion of the 66th Historical Regatta, Pisa paraded for the last time in the usual procession which focused the story on Kinzica De' Sismondi. Starting with the next edition, held in Pisa in September 2022, the new costumes and fashion show made their debut, designed to enhance the entire historical arc of the Pisan Republic and all the figures that have come and gone over time.

=== Venice ===
The central episode of the Venetian procession is the donation of the island of Cyprus to Venice, which took place in 1489 thanks to Catherine Cornaro, a noblewoman of the city as well as a Cypriot queen, who ceded the lordship of the island to Venice. The highest offices of the Venetian republic parade in the procession: the doge, the senators, the ambassadors and the captain of the sea (head of the fleet). Furthermore, the "banner of Saint Mark" is shown, donated to Venice in 1171 by Pope Alexander III to thank the city, which acted as a mediator between the Papacy, the Empire and the Municipalities.

The layout of the procession is as follows. 3 banners; 4 nobles; 4 drums; 6 buglers; 8 banners; 10 senators; 1 horn holder; the doge and the umbrella holder; 2 pages; 1 stock holder; 4 Eastern Ambassadors; 8 ladies; the Queen of Cyprus Catherine Cornaro; the Cypriot delegation (6 people); the sea captain; 8 armed.

== Extraordinary regattas ==
In addition to the annual events, extraordinary editions of the historical regatta were also held:

- On July 2, 1961, Turin, on the waters of the Po, on the occasion of the 1st centenary of the Unification of Italy. The race saw Genoa winner (1st), followed by Amalfi (2nd), Venice (3rd) and Pisa (4th).
- On July 23, 1983, London, on the Thames, where the Maritime Republics competed against four English crews and the winner was Venice;
- In 1988, in Bari.
- In 1991, in Marina di Pisa, on the occasion of the anniversary of the Battle of Meloria.
- In 1993, in Noli and Syracuse, both won by the Genoese crew.
- In 1999, in Monaco, as part of the celebrations for the jubilee of Rainier III, Prince of Monaco; in this edition a crew of Monegasque rowers participated and Pisa was victorious.
- In 2000, in Meta di Sorrento, on the occasion of the historical reenactment of the landing of the Saracen fleets.
- On June 13, 2009, in La Spezia, within the events of the Festa della Marineria, held from June 11 to 16. The extraordinary regatta, held in the waters in front of the Morin promenade, was won by Genoa (1st), followed by Venice (2nd), Pisa (3rd) and Amalfi (4th).
- On September 11, 2022 in Pisa to recover the 2020 regatta canceled due to the COVID-19 pandemic.

== Regattas ==
=== All-male crew ===
Edition	Year	Host city	1st	2nd	3rd	4th
1	1956	Pisa	Venice	Pisa	Genoa	Amalfi
2	1957	Amalfi	Venice	Pisa	Amalfi	Genoa
3	1958	Venice	Venice	Pisa	Genoa	Amalfi
4	1959	Genoa	Genoa	Venice	Pisa	Amalfi
5	1960	Pisa	Genoa	Pisa	Venice	Amalfi
6	1961	Amalfi	Venice	Pisa	Genoa	Amalfi
7	1962	Venice	Venice	Pisa	Genoa	Amalfi
8	1963	Genoa	Venice	Pisa	Genoa	Amalfi
9	1964	Pisa	Genoa	Venice	Pisa	Amalfi
10	1965	Amalfi	Venice	Genoa	Amalfi	Pisa
11	1966	Venice	Venice	Genoa	Pisa	Amalfi
12	1967	Genoa	Venice	Genoa	Pisa	Amalfi
13	1968	Amalfi	Venice	Genoa	Pisa	Amalfi
14	1969	Pisa	Venice	Pisa	Genoa	Amalfi
15	1970	Venice	Pisa	Venice	Genoa	Amalfi
16	1971	Genoa	Venice	Genoa	Pisa	Amalfi
17	1972	Venice	Pisa	Venice	Genoa	Amalfi
18	1973	Amalfi	Venice	Pisa	Genoa	Amalfi
19	1974	Genoa	Venice	Pisa	Genoa	Amalfi
20	1975	Pisa	Amalfi	Venice	Pisa	Genoa
21	1976	Venice	Genoa	Venice	Pisa	Amalfi
22	1977	Amalfi	Venice	Genoa	Amalfi	Pisa
23	1978	Genoa	Genoa	Venice	Pisa	Amalfi
24	1979	Pisa	Amalfi	Pisa	Genoa	Venice
25	1980	Venice	Venice	Amalfi	Pisa	Genoa
26	1981	Amalfi	Amalfi	Genoa	Pisa	Venice
27	1982	Genoa	Venice	Genoa	Amalfi	Pisa
28	1983	Pisa	Venice	Amalfi	Pisa	Genoa
29	1984	Venice	Venice	Genoa	Amalfi	Pisa
30	1985	Amalfi	Venice	Genoa	Pisa	Amalfi
31	1986	Genoa	Venice	Genoa	Pisa	Amalfi
32	1987	Pisa	Pisa	Venice	Genoa	Amalfi
33	1988	Venice	Pisa	Venice	Genoa	Amalfi
34	1989	Amalfi	Venice	Amalfi	Genoa	Pisa
35	1990	Genoa	Venice	Pisa	Genoa	Amalfi
36	1991	Pisa	Genoa	Venice	Amalfi	Pisa
37	1992	Genoa	Venice	Pisa	Genoa	Amalfi
38	1993	Amalfi	Pisa	Genoa	Venice	Amalfi
39	1994	Venice	Venice	Pisa	Genoa	Amalfi
40	1995	Pisa	Amalfi	Genoa	Pisa	Venice
41	1996	Genoa	Amalfi	Pisa	Venice	Genoa
42	1997	Amalfi	Amalfi	Pisa	Genoa	Venice
43	1998	Pisa	Venice	Genoa	Pisa	Amalfi
44	1999	Venice	Genoa	Venice	Amalfi	Pisa
45	2000	Genoa	Genoa	Amalfi	Venice	Pisa
46	2001	Amalfi	Amalfi	Genoa	Venice	Pisa
47	2002	Pisa	Amalfi	Pisa	Venice	Genoa
48	2003	Venice	Amalfi	Venice	Genoa	Pisa
49	2004	Genoa	Venice	Amalfi	Pisa	Genoa
50	2005	Amalfi	Venice	Pisa	Amalfi	Genoa
51	2006	Pisa	Pisa	Venice	Amalfi	Genoa
52	2007	Venice	Venice	Pisa	Genoa	Amalfi
53	2008	Amalfi	Venice	Pisa	Genoa	Amalfi
54	2009	Pisa	Pisa	Amalfi	Genoa	Venice
55	2010	Genoa	Pisa	Amalfi	Venice	Genoa
56	2011	Venice	Voided regatta			
57	2012	Amalfi	Amalfi	Venice	Pisa	Genoa
58	2013	Pisa	Venice	Pisa	Amalfi	Genoa
59	2014	Genoa	Venice	Amalfi	Genoa	Pisa
60	2015	Venice	Venice	Amalfi	Genoa	Pisa
61	2016	Amalfi	Amalfi	Pisa	Genoa	Venice
62	2017	Pisa	Genoa	Pisa	Venice	Amalfi
63	2018	Genoa	Amalfi	Genoa	Venice	Pisa
64	2019	Venice	Venice	Genoa	Pisa	Amalfi
	2020		Cancelled due to the COVID-19 pandemic			
65	2021	Genoa	Genoa	Amalfi	Venice	Pisa
66	2022	Amalfi	Amalfi	Venice	Genoa	Pisa
67	2022	Pisa	Genoa	Venice	Amalfi	Pisa
68	2023	Venice	Genoa	Venice	Amalfi	Pisa
69	2024	Genoa	Genoa	Pisa	Venice	Amalfi
70	2025	Amalfi	Genoa	Amalfi	Pisa	Venice
71	2026	Pisa	Venice	Genoa	Pisa	Amalfi
72	2027	Venice				

=== Victories (All-male crew) by city ===
City	1st	2nd	3rd	4th
Venice	35	17	11	7
Genoa	14	18	26	12
Amalfi	13	11	12	34
Pisa	8	24	21	17

=== All-female crew ===
Edition	Year	Host city	1st	2nd	3rd	4th
69 (1)	2024	Genoa	Genoa	Pisa	Amalfi	Venice
70 (2)	2025	Amalfi	Genoa	Pisa	Venice	Amalfi
71 (3)	2026	Pisa	Pisa	Venice	Amalfi	Genoa (Note: Disqualification for lane jumping)
72 (4)	2027	Venice				

=== Victories (All-female crew) by city ===
City	1st	2nd	3rd	4th
Genoa	2	0	0	1
Pisa	1	2	0	0
Amalfi	0	0	2	1
Venice	0	1	1	1

=== Total wins by city ===
City	1st	2nd	3rd	4th
Venice	35	18	12	8
Genoa	16	18	26	13
Amalfi	13	11	14	35
Pisa	9	26	21	17

== See also ==
- Italian Navy
