= San Terenzo =

- Frazione
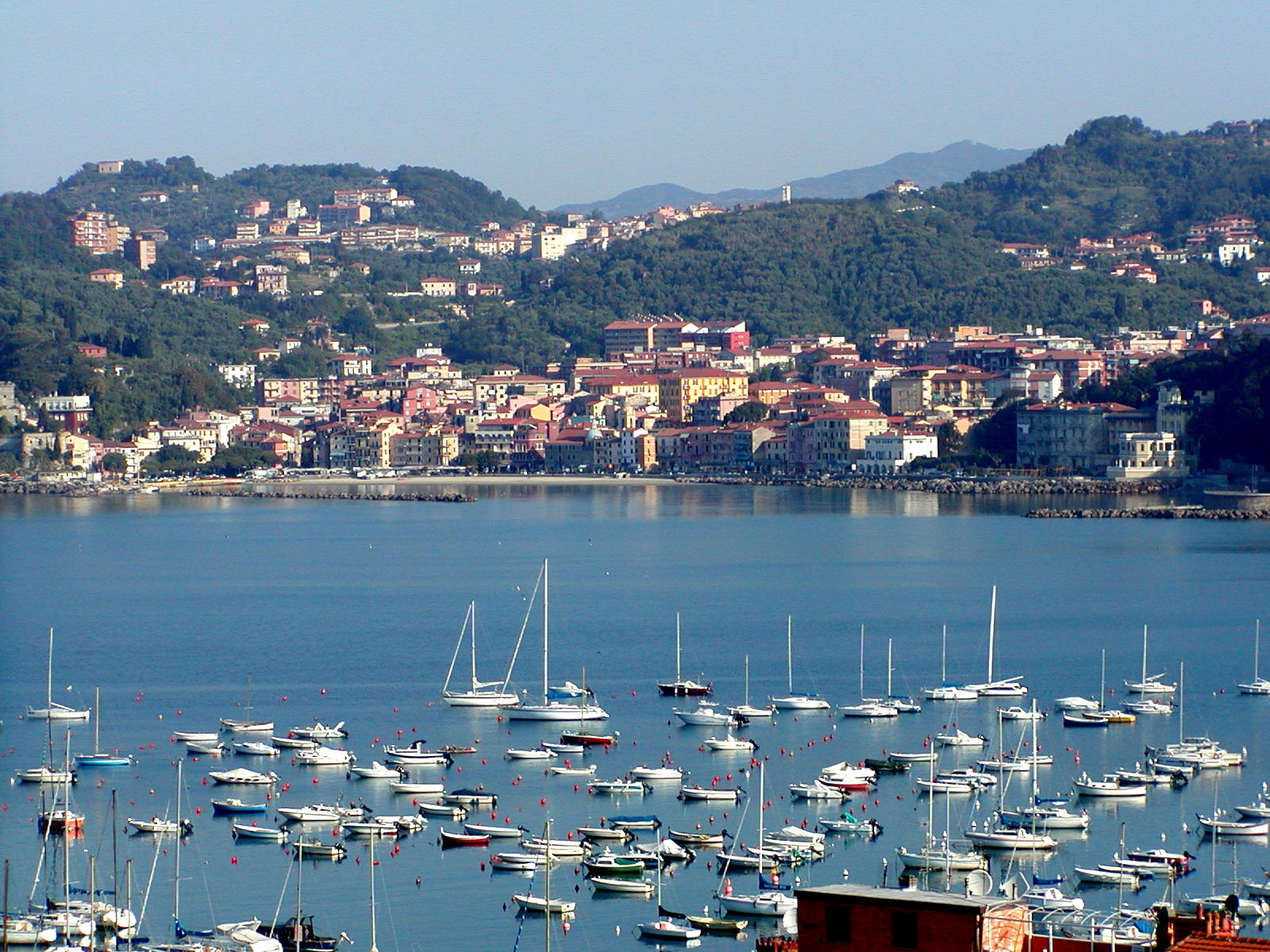
- View of San Terenzo from Lerici

- Location of San Terenzo in Italy
- Coordinates: 44°05′10″N 9°53′45″E
- Country: Italy
- Region: Liguria
- Province: La Spezia
- Comune: Lerici
- Highest elevation: 25 m (82 ft)
- Lowest elevation: 3 m (9.8 ft)

Population
  - Total: 1,200
- Demonym: Santerenzini
- Time zone: UTC+1 (CET)
  - Summer (DST): UTC+2 (CEST)
- Postal code: 19036
- Dialing code: 0187

San Terenzo is a frazione, seaside village, in the comune of Lerici in the province of La Spezia. It sits on the Gulf of La Spezia (also known as the Golfo dei Poeti), just two kilometres north-west of Lerici, and about five kilometres south-east from the city of La Spezia, the provincial capital.

The town, located between the foothills and the gulf, is characterized by typical apartments, connected by small alleyways and stairs, also called carugi, with a main piazza along the water.

== History ==
Originally a fishing village dating back to medieval times, San Terenzo contains a castle most likely built by its own inhabitants in the 12th century, and fortified in the Late Middle Ages. The fortress has no unified design, given the inner walls are believed to have been built between the 14th and 15th centuries, and in the 16th century, a second, outer ring was added. Later, the Republic of Genoa fortified the castle, turning it into a barracks between the 19th and 20th century. Today it has been restored and is now used for exhibitions. San Terenzo's parish church dates back to the 17th century.

Today, the town is home to about 1,200 people year round, and is a popular domestic tourist destination for Italians from northern and central regions.

== Culture ==
San Terenzo is an area that later became attractive for artists and intellectuals. As a haven for poets and writers, Mary Shelley, as well as her husband and poet, Percy Bysshe Shelley stayed at Villa Magni, on the promenade to Lerici. Percy Shelley eventually died in a shipwreck on a return boat trip to San Terenzo. Other prominent personalities, such as Arnold Böcklin, Virginia Woolf, Paolo Mantegazza and Sam Benelli, were known to visit the seaside village. The legacy of the artist and poets still exists today, as art exhibits are constructed for display within the castle. Other cultural and arts events have been proposed for the castle to function as a cultural or community space.

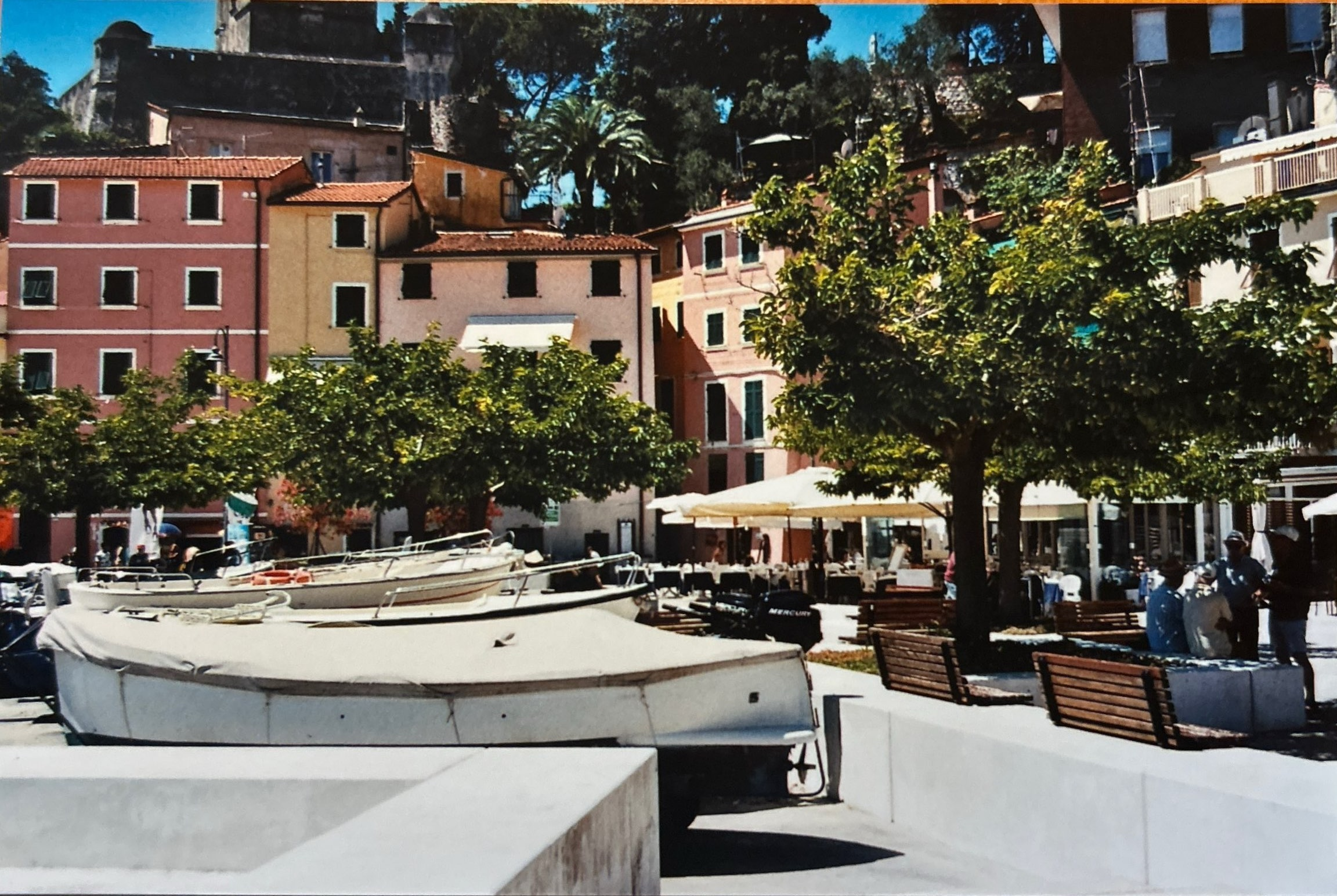
Piazza della Libera featuring dry docked boats

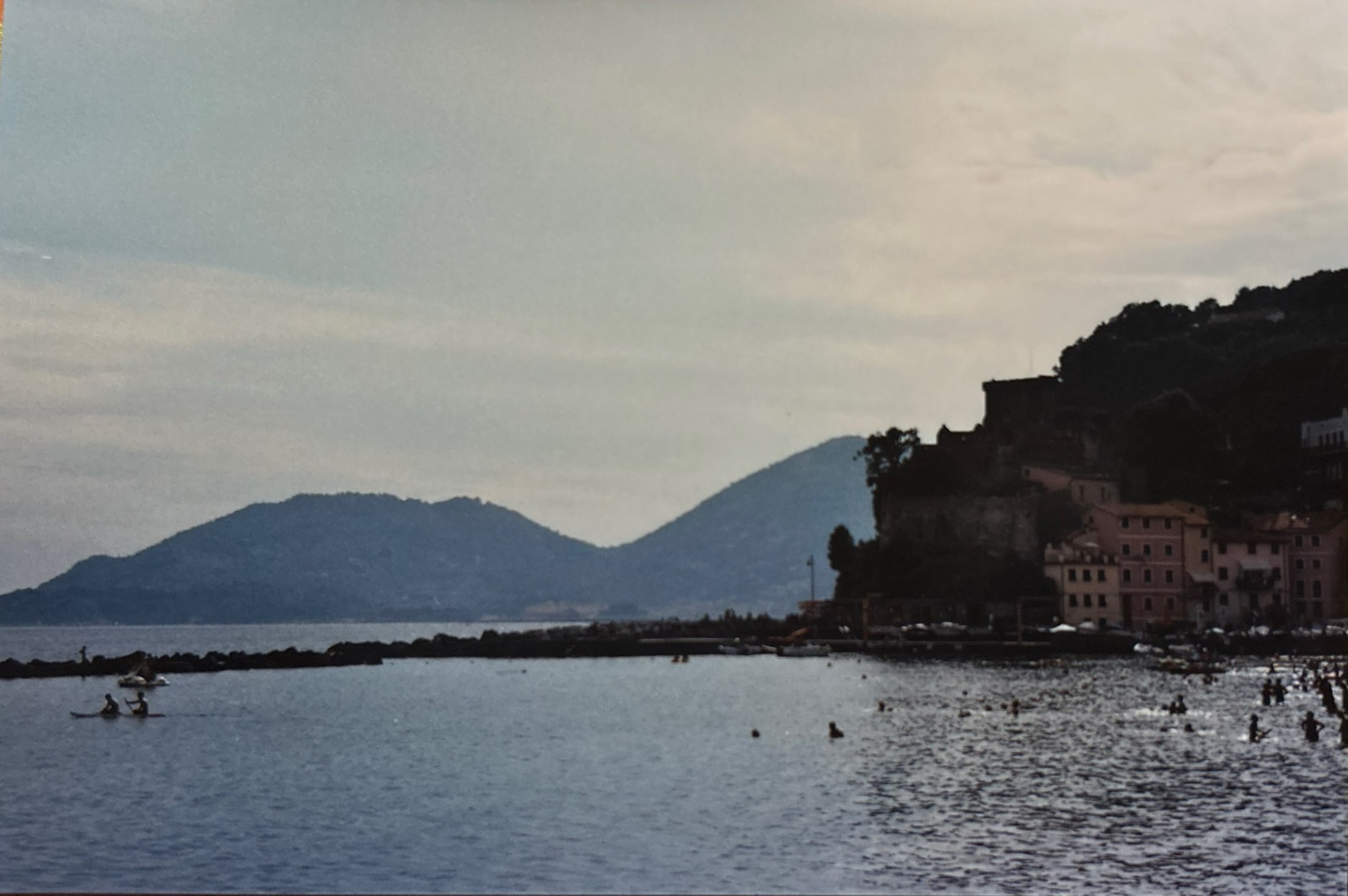
San Terenzo beach area for swimming

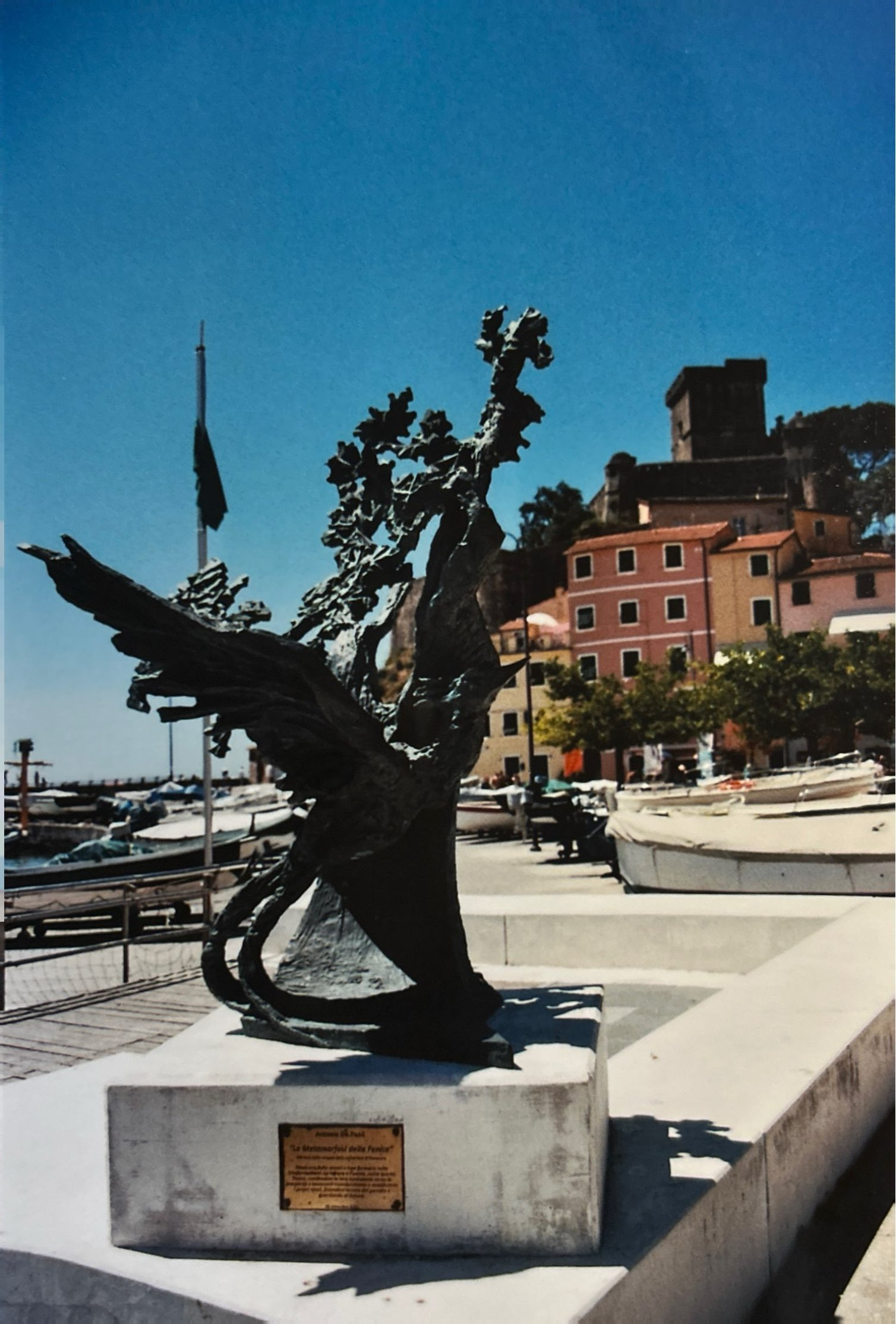
Statue in Piazza della Liberta

Sailing and boating is common in San Terenzo. There is a small bay for boat parking. Every summer, San Terenzo is the starting point for a boating race, il Palio del Golfo, a 1000 meter regatta, or boat race, held bi-annually in July and August. Six teams participate in the regatta, each representing a small town, or borgho, surrounding the Gulf of Spezia. In 2025, il Palio del Golfo celebrated its 100th year. Flags representing each borgho are draped across the castle in the north of the main piazza before the race.

There is an active community association, Pro Loco, that engages with the local government bodies of Lerici and the constituents in San Terenzo to support community events and festivals.
