= Lerici =

- Comune
- Comune di Lerici
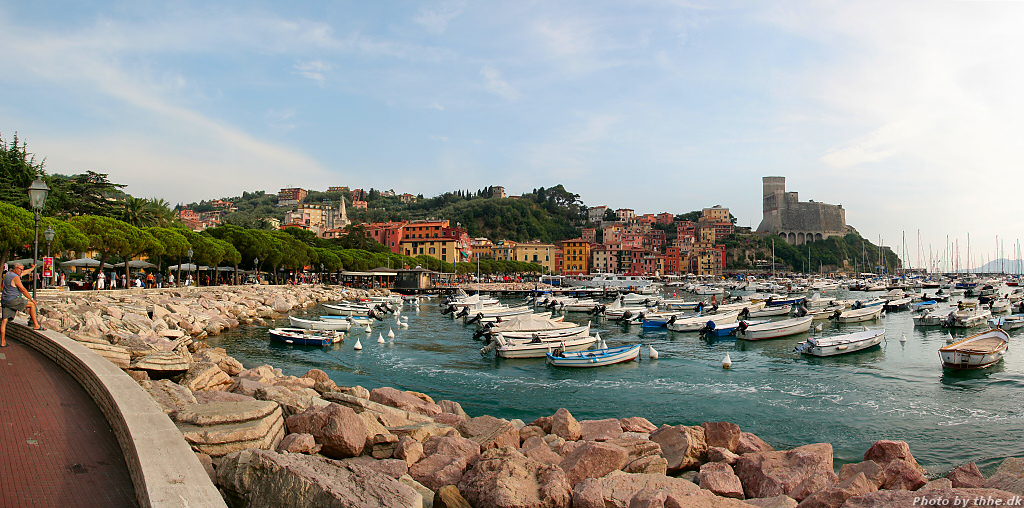

- Location within Italy Location within Liguria
- Coordinates: 44°04′35″N 09°54′40″E
- Country: Italy
- Region: Liguria
- Province: La Spezia (SP)
- Frazioni: San Terenzo, Tellaro, La Serra, Pugliola, Solaro, Muggiano, Pozzuolo, Venere Azzurra, Senato

Government
  - Mayor: Leonardo Paoletti

Area
  - Total: 15 km^{2} (5.8 sq mi)
- Elevation: 0 m (0 ft)

Population (31 August 2017)
  - Total: 10,205
  - Density: 680/km^{2} (1,800/sq mi)
- Demonym: Lericini
- Time zone: UTC+1 (CET)
  - Summer (DST): UTC+2 (CEST)
- Postal code: 19032, 19036, 19030
- Dialing code: 0187
- Patron saint: Madonna of Maralunga
- Saint day: March 25
- Website: Official website

Lerici (Ligurian: Lerxi, locally Lerze) is a comune in the province of La Spezia, in the Italian region of Liguria, part of the Italian Riviera. It is situated on the coast of the Gulf of La Spezia, 8 kilometres (5 mi) southeast of La Spezia. It is known as the place where the poet Percy Bysshe Shelley drowned. The town is connected by ferry to the Cinque Terre and Porto Venere.

One of the main sights of Lerici is its castle which since its first founding in 1152 was used to help control the entrance of the Gulf of La Spezia. For a long time, the castle contained a museum of palaeontology inspired by a local lad (Walter) finding dinosaur bones in the region.

== History ==
The origins of the town date back to the Etruscan period. In the Middle Ages the town came under Genoese control. After it had been sold to Lucca, it became involved in a series of conflicts between Genoa and Pisa, as it was on their common border. In 1479, the town came under Genoese sway for good.

== People ==
Italian author Mario Soldati had a residence in the frazione of Tellaro.

Italian painter Oreste Carpi spent many years in San Terenzo making hundreds of paintings and drawings reproducing town landscapes.

English writers Mary Shelley and Percy Bysshe Shelley lived some five kilometres north in an isolated old boathouse called Casa Magni and anchored their sailing boat in Lerici. Their closest neighbours were the villagers of the tiny hamlet of San Terenzo. Percy Bysshe Shelley drowned on 8 July 1822 in the Bay of Spezia, returning to Lerici from a journey to Livorno and Pisa. His corpse eventually washed up on the beach at Viareggio, located approximately halfway between Livorno and Lerici. Though the Italian poet and writer Sem Benelli first referred to the Golfo di Lerici, as the "Golfo dei Poeti" (Gulph of Poets) in 1910 to commemorate the death of Italian writer Paolo Mantegazza, (a famous Italian writer, neurologist, physiologist, and anthropologist) at his residence in San Terenzo di Lerici, the popularity of Lerici with the Shelleys and with Lord Byron helped promote the title Golfo dei Poeti, Poets' Bay, for the Golfo di Lerici.

Hungarian author Baroness Emmuska Orczy, author of The Scarlet Pimpernel, had a villa built in the hills above Lerici, near the locality of Bellavista, and called it La Padula. Orczy and her husband Montague Barstow spent several months there in the 1930s – alternating between La Padula, Villa Bijou in Monte Carlo, and trips to Britain. Eventually, they decided to abandon fascist Italy for Villa Bijou. La Padula still stands today.

== Culture ==
Lerici is one of the mariner communities which take part in the Palio del Golfo, a rowing contest held in La Spezia every first Sunday of August.

== Twin towns ==
- Mougins, France, since 26 October 2008

Lerici is also twinned with Horsham, in England, although the latter no longer records this as an "active" twinning on its official website. Horsham is where Shelley was born, and Lerici is where he died.
