= Sanctuary of Our Lady of Montallegro =

Marian shrine in Liguria, Italy

Coordinates: 44°22′12″N 9°15′20″E

- Santuario di Nostra Signora di Montallegro
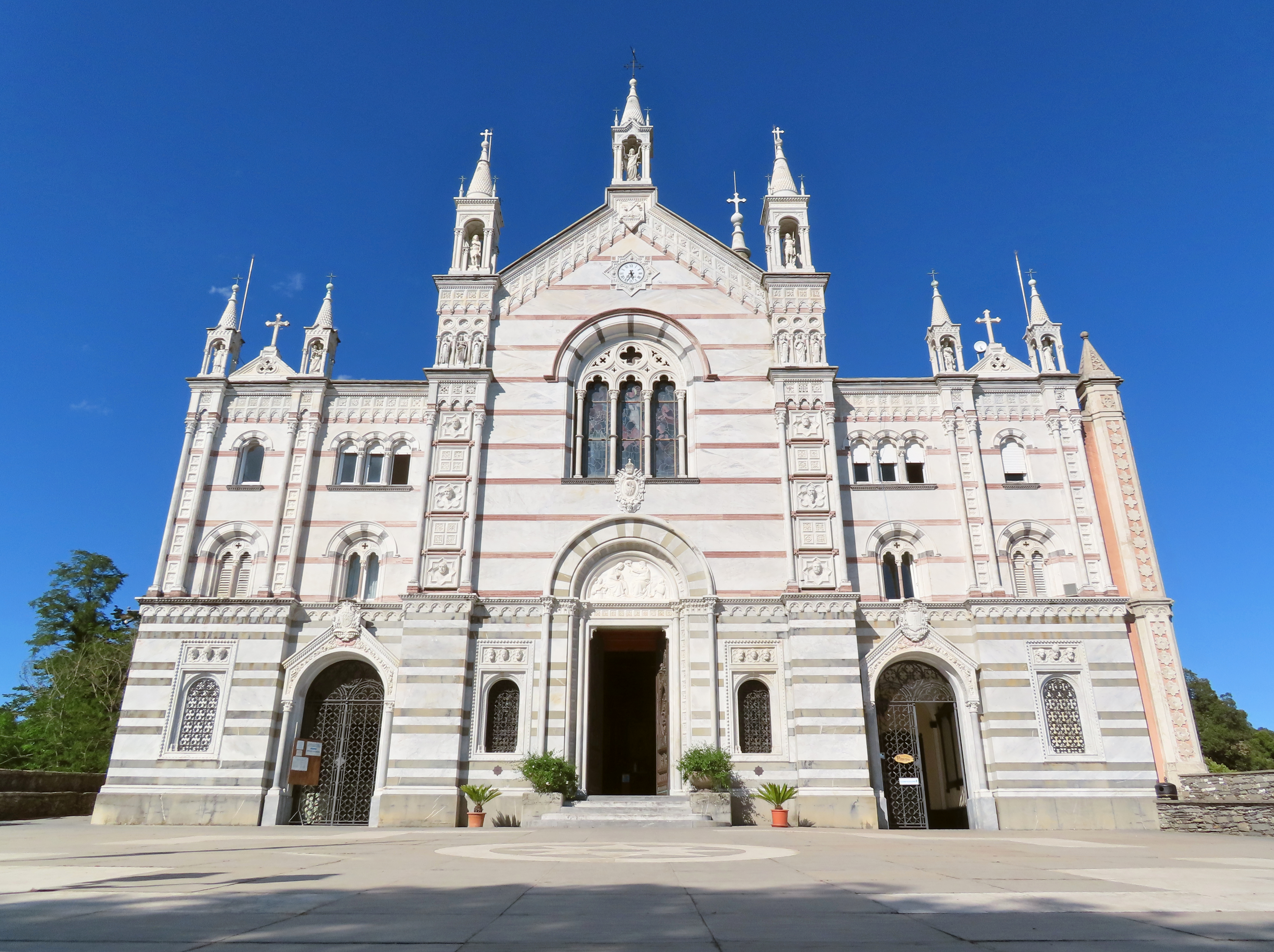
- Facade
- Sanctuary of Our Lady of Montallegro
- Location: Montallegro (Rapallo), Liguria, Italy
- Denomination: Catholic
- Website: https://www.santuarionsmontallegro.com/

History
- Dedication: Mary

Architecture
- Architect(s): Tommasino Lagomaggiore (1557); Luigi Rovelli (1896)
- Style: Baroque Revival
- Groundbreaking: 1557; 1640
- Completed: 1559; 1896

Administration
- Diocese: Roman Catholic Diocese of Chiavari

The basilica sanctuary of Our Lady of Montallegro is a place of Catholic worship located in the hamlet of Montallegro in the municipality of Rapallo, in the metropolitan city of Genoa.

The building is located on a hill about 612 m above sea level.

Considered to be among the main Marian shrines in the metropolitan area of Genoa and Liguria, it was built by the people of Rapallo between 1557 and 1558, together with the adjoining pilgrims' shelter, after the apparition of the Virgin Mary to the peasant Giovanni Chichizola on July 2, 1557, according to tradition. The current marble façade is the result of the restoration work carried out by the Milanese architect Luigi Rovelli in 1896, inaugurated with a solemn ceremony on June 21 of the same year.

Our Lady of Montallegro has been the patron saint of the City of Rapallo since 1739, the year in which she was elected as patron saint of the Rapallo community, its captaincy and the parishes of Santa Margherita Ligure. This recognition is reproduced on the municipal coat of arms, which bears, since November 28, 1948, the Marian monogram, formed by the intertwined letters M and A, placed between the two griffins supporting the royal crown.

Together with Our Lady of the Garden - who appeared in Chiavari on July 2, 1610 - she is co-patroness of the diocese of Chiavari, the latter erected by papal bull of Leo XIII on December 3, 1892. The religious hymn to Our Lady of Montallegro, entitled Splende in alto, was composed and set to music by the maestro and priest Giovanni Battista Campodonico.

== History ==
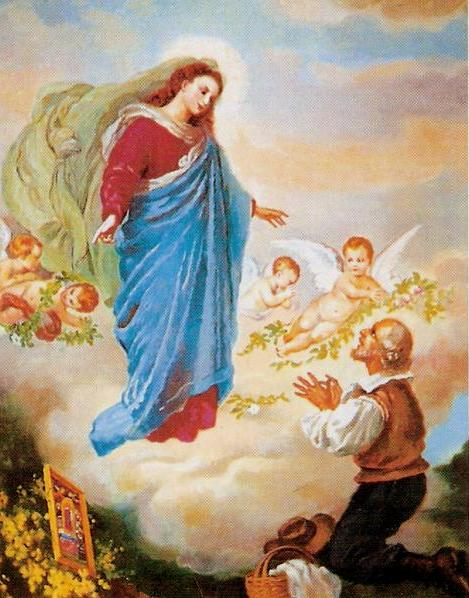
Depiction of the Marian apparition of Montallegro

=== Marian apparition ===
According to local tradition, the Virgin appeared in the early afternoon of Friday, July 2, 1557, to the farmer Giovanni Chichizola, a native of San Giacomo di Canevale, a hamlet of the municipality of Coreglia Ligure, who was returning from the fruit and vegetable market in Genoa. Having reached the Rapallo hinterland, in the wooded properties of the Ghibelline Della Torre family, at the height of Mount Letho (known by the locals as “mount of death” because of the numerous raids of brigands), the man - fatigued by the long journey on foot and exhausted by the heat - fell asleep near a rocky spur.

Suddenly, he was awakened by a glow: to the peasant appeared a "lady dressed in blue and white and looking graceful and kind," as he textually reported later to the first commoners and the civil and religious authorities who had rushed to the mountain. The woman uttered only a few words, which for the Rapallo Christian community still resonate vividly:

Go and tell the people of Rapallo that I want to be honored here.

To give proof of the “miraculous apparition,” Our Lady left as a gift to the farmer a small painting of Byzantine art depicting the Dormitio Mariae, to be given to the Rapallese community. After the sudden disappearance of the "Beautiful Lady," fresh and pure water also began to flow from the same rock where the apparition had occurred.

Having recovered from the exceptional religious event, the farmer from Canevale then undertook the path back to the village of Rapallo to announce to the inhabitants the message entrusted to him by the Virgin Mary, and then recount what had happened. He reached the citadel trying to attract the attention of the Rapallo inhabitants, but they, troubled by the clashes between the Guelph and Ghibelline factions, initially disregarded the news and the words of the peasant who appeared in their eyes as a "dreamer" or a "fanatic." Discouraged and feeling disbelieved, Chichizola asked to speak with the local parish priest, the only religious authority who could believe him.

The parish priest, believing the words of the peasant (who was also heard and questioned by the civil authorities of the local municipality), went with a group of the faithful to the alleged site of the apparition, where they were able to ascertain the presence of the aforementioned Byzantine image, near the sudden and gushing spring of water. As evening approached, the parish priest decided to take the image to Rapallo, to a safer place in the Basilica of Saints Gervasius and Protasius. The next morning, however, the tablet was found on Mount Letho. The parish priest, followed by the clergy and the authorities, went to the place of the event and, in a solemn and religious ceremony, the icon was transported to the village of Rapallo, where it was locked in a cabinet in the parish church. The next day there was great astonishment at the sudden disappearance of the small painting and its discovery on the mountain where the image of Our Lady, now celebrated by the people and "officialized" by the clergy of Rapallo, was to be kept and venerated.

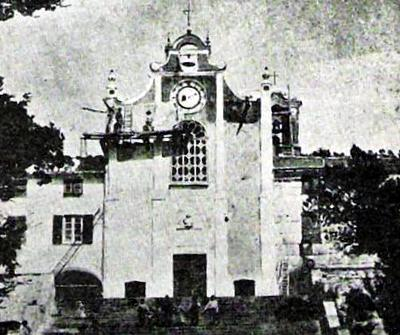
The sanctuary in a late 19th century photo

The following is what he wrote in one of the two minutes drawn up on August 6, 1558 by the Vicar of the Archdiocese of Genoa, Monsignor Egidio Falceta, who had been appointed by Archbishop Gerolamo Sauli to investigate the case:

It is well known, and we ourselves saw and were present at the events, the many and stupendous miracles that the glorious and immaculate Virgin performed in the place commonly called "Mount" in the diocese of Genoa, about three miles from Rapallo. There, according to pious belief, the Virgin appeared and then a small table was found with the image of the glorious Virgin at the time of her Assumption. This is the testimony of those who, tormented by demons, were freed from them, the blind saw again, the lame walked miraculously, many who were paralyzed went up there, took refuge with the Virgin, returned free from all evil by her virtue...

=== The stages of the construction of the sanctuary ===
As religious worship of Our Lady of Montallegro and the Byzantine icon spread, it soon became necessary to build a suitable place of prayer and shelter for the ever-increasing influx of pilgrims. A hospice for pilgrims and clergy was built before the actual church, although between 1557 and 1558 the inhabitants had already built a small temple to preserve and display the small image.

The construction of a new sanctuary was soon begun, with the support and work of the people of Rapallo themselves, under the direction of the Comacine master Tommasino Lagomaggiore, who, with no small effort to transport the materials up the hill, completed the first architectural version of the sanctuary, with a single nave, in 1559. At the same time, efforts were made to build the cobbled mule track between the village of San Bartolomeo di Borzoli and Mount Letho, an uphill wooded path about 4 km long.

The suppressed monastery of Valle Christi, located in the Rapallo hamlet of San Massimo, was united to the new sanctuary by a papal bull of Gregory XIII in 1572, while the parish of Saints Gervasius and Protasius was definitively entrusted with the management of the temple by archiepiscopal decree of Monsignor Antonio Maria Sauli on March 8, 1589, despite the request submitted by the nearby parish community of San Maurizio di Monti.

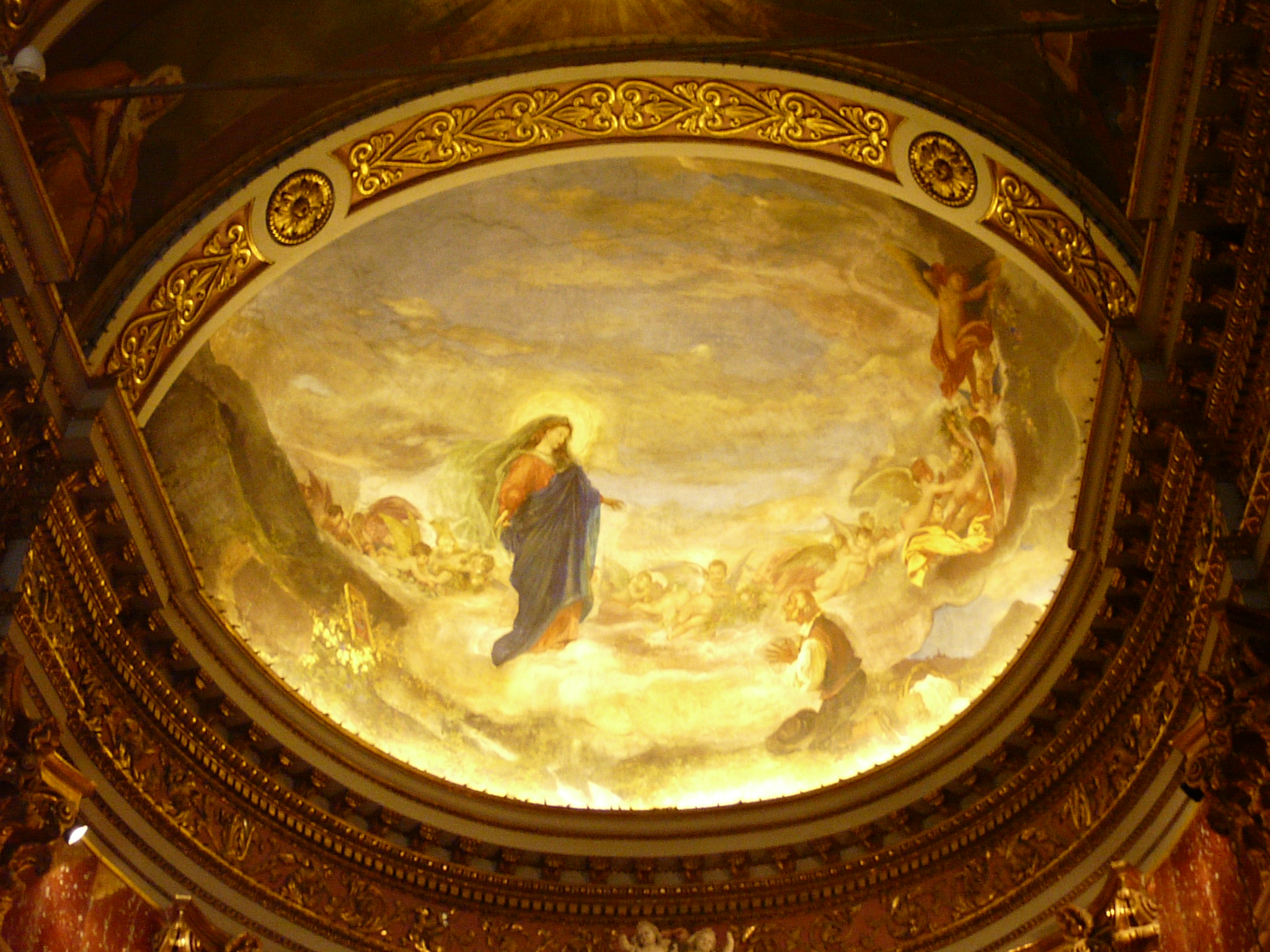
The fresco of the Marian apparition, painted by Nicolò Barabino in the semi-dome.

During the apostolic visitation in 1582 of the bishop of Novara, Monsignor Francesco Bossi, some changes to the church were ordered, requested by the bishop himself. During the works, the altar was enlarged, a larger sacred stone was placed on it and a larger cover was placed to protect it from dust. However, the first and most substantial expansion of the sanctuary was carried out in 1640, which also allowed the placement of the new side altars. This is how the temple acquired its present dimensions: 25 meters long, 11 meters wide and 12 meters high.

In 1772 the nearby guesthouse was enlarged, while in 1867 the artistic renovation of the church's interior took place, under the direction of master Descalzo from Chiavari, with the addition of new stucco, pilasters and capitals by Swiss architect Pietro Delucchi. The Rapallo painter Francesco Boero, on the other hand, was responsible for the creation of the four frescoes in the vault reproducing the main events related to the Byzantine painting, while the Genoese Nicolò Barabino was the creator of the large fresco in the semi-dome depicting the Apparition of Our Lady of Montallegro to Chichizola.

In 1882 the Milanese architect Luigi Rovelli was the designer of the new high altar, donated by Gianbattista Merello from Zoagli, which was incorporated along with the pre-existing altarpiece, and Rovelli himself created the new facade in Lombard Gothic style (completed on June 21, 1896) and the adjoining pointed bell tower (30 m high) in 1907 and which in 1946 was equipped with the eight bells. In the same years the new and wider staircase accessing the square of the sanctuary was built, then renovated in 1982.

Other works of architectural significance were later completed during the 20th century. Among them was the completion of the road in 1932, which in about 11 kilometers, tracing a route to Coreglia Ligure and then to the Fontanabuona valley (through the Crocetta pass) passing through the hamlet of San Maurizio di Monti, allowed motorized vehicles to reach the site; the creation of the new polychrome stained-glass windows (1937-1938); the laying of the fourteen ceramic Stations of the Cross, in 1941, along the path to Monte Rosa; the new Pilgrim's House in 1948; the bronze doors (1957) and the new slate paving of the square between 1992 and 1994.

Since December 20, 2009, a rack-and-pinion elevator has connected the roadway to the sanctuary square above, effectively eliminating the existing architectural barriers that made it difficult to access the religious building.

=== Other historical notes ===
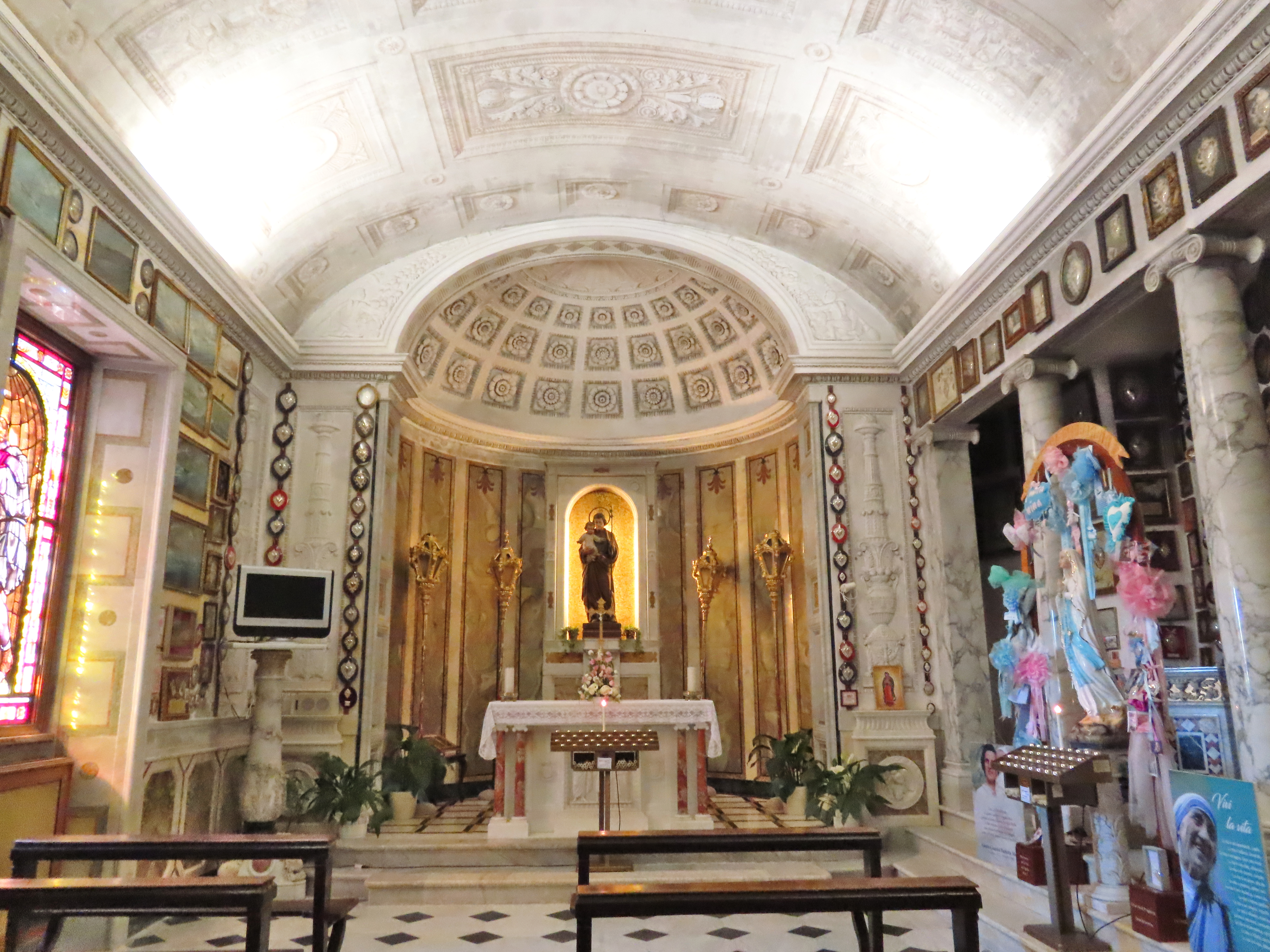
The Chapel of St. Joseph

Popular devotion to Our Lady of Montallegro was soon transformed from a religious spirit to an official and civil recognition of the Rapallo community. There were as many as fifteen gatherings that the Magnificent Community of Rapallo convened in the various religious sites belonging to the jurisdiction of the captaincy of the same name, with the exception of the centers of Santa Margherita (center), Portofino and the district of Oltremonte (area of the central Fontanabuona valley).

A total of 1,922 heads of families from the parish territories of Rapallo, Santa Maria del Campo, San Massimo, San Pietro di Novella, Sant'Andrea di Foggia, San Martino di Noceto, San Quirico d'Assereto, San Maurizio di Monti, San Michele di Pagana, San Giacomo di Corte, San Siro, Zoagli, Sant'Ambrogio della Costa and Semorile voted - with only 6 votes against - for the election of Our Lady of Montallegro as patroness of the city and the captaincy. To the votes in favor was added the formal assent of the clergy of Rapallo and the religious communities of the monasteries and convents of St. Augustine, St. Francis of Assisi, St. Clare of Montefalco, and the Capuchins of Santa Margherita Ligure.

This choice was confirmed by the members of the Magnificent Community of Rapallo:

Not knowing how best to show our gratitude to our Heavenly Protectress to the whole world, we have gathered here to elect and proclaim the Blessed Virgin Mother of the True God, under the title of Our Lady of Mount Allegro, as the main patroness of our territory.

The results of the Rapallo meetings were then brought to the attention of the archbishop of Genoa, Friar Nicolò Maria De Franchi, and the Sacred Congregation of Rites in Rome during the first months of 1739. On June 14 of that year from Rome came the officialization of the patronage with the display of the decree at the parish church of Saints Gervasius and Protasius and, in copy, on the main door of the sanctuary.

On July 27, 1767, the Byzantine icon, henceforth the patron saint of the community of Rapallo and of the villages under its jurisdiction, was crowned "Queen" by the delegate of the Chapter of St. Peter in Rome, Monsignor Andrea Doria, in a solemn religious and civil ceremony. On the occasion of the event, Pope Clement XIII granted a plenary indulgence to pilgrims traveling to the sanctuary, which was attached to the Roman basilica of Santa Maria Maggiore.

=== Visitors to the sanctuary ===
Among the religious personalities who visited the sanctuary - erected into a minor basilica by a papal decree of August 5, 1942 by Pius XII - are documented the presences of Genoese Cardinal Stefano Durazzo on May 26, 1638, St. Francis de Sales in 1591, Brigida Morello in 1639, St. Leonard of Port Maurice, St. Antonio Maria Gianelli, St. Francesco Maria da Camporosso, Archbishop Tommaso Reggio of Genoa in 1845, St. Agostino Roscelli, St. John Bosco, Cardinal Andrea Carlo Ferrari in 1907, and of then Monsignor Angelo Giuseppe Roncalli, future Pope John XXIII - who celebrated the Pontifical Mass on October 2, 1922.

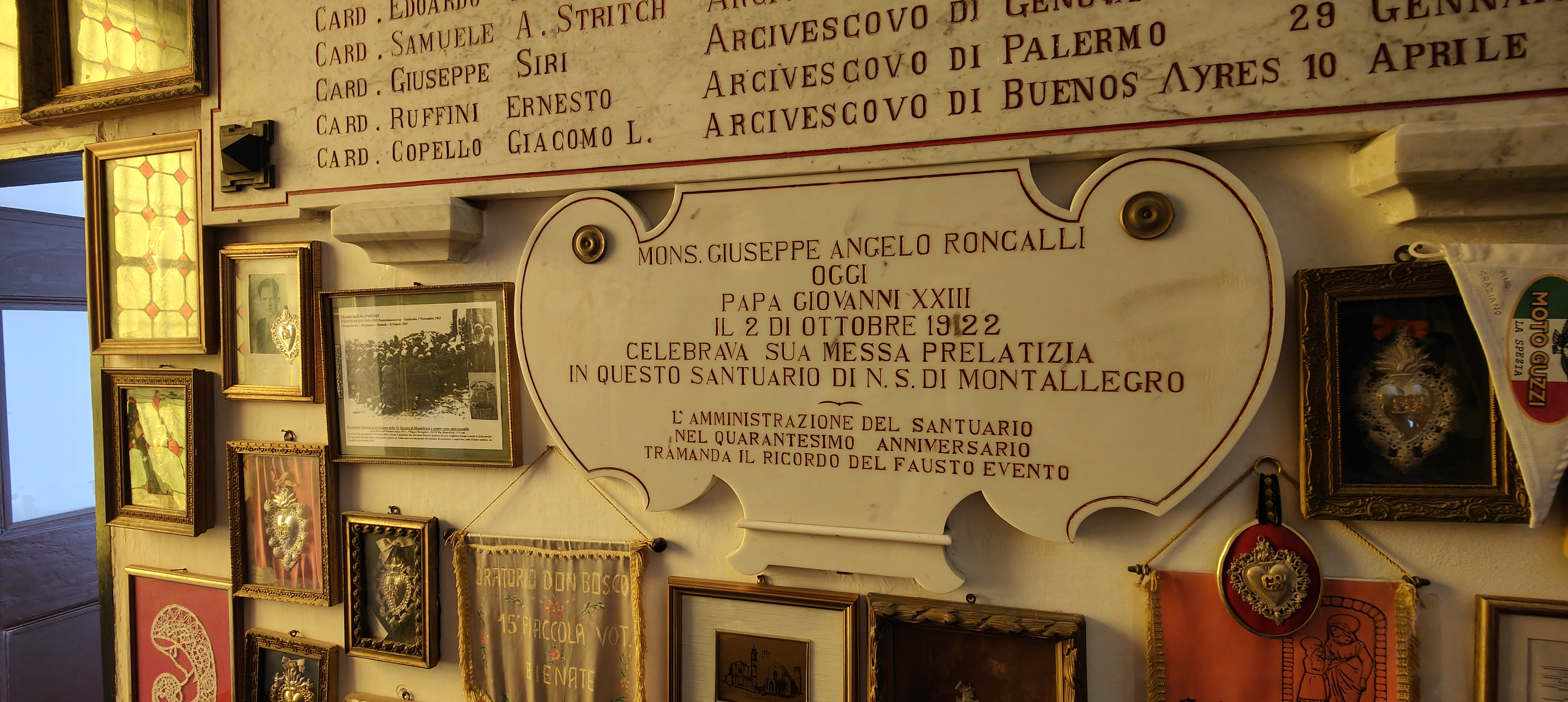
Marble plaque commemorating the visit of Monsignor Roncalli (Oct. 2, 1922).

On July 1 and July 2, 2007, on the occasion of the 450th anniversary of the Marian apparition of Montallegro, the sanctuary also received the visit of Cardinal Secretary of State Tarcisio Bertone and Archbishop of Genoa Angelo Bagnasco, the latter president of the Episcopal Conference of Italy. The two visits can be considered historic since it is the first time in the documented history of the sanctuary that a cardinal of state and a president of the CEI climbed the Rapallo hill to visit the religious building.

Another historic ceremony took place on July 28, 2008 when, for the first time, a wedding was celebrated at the sanctuary with an Orthodox rite.

=== The alleged miracles attributed to the Virgin ===
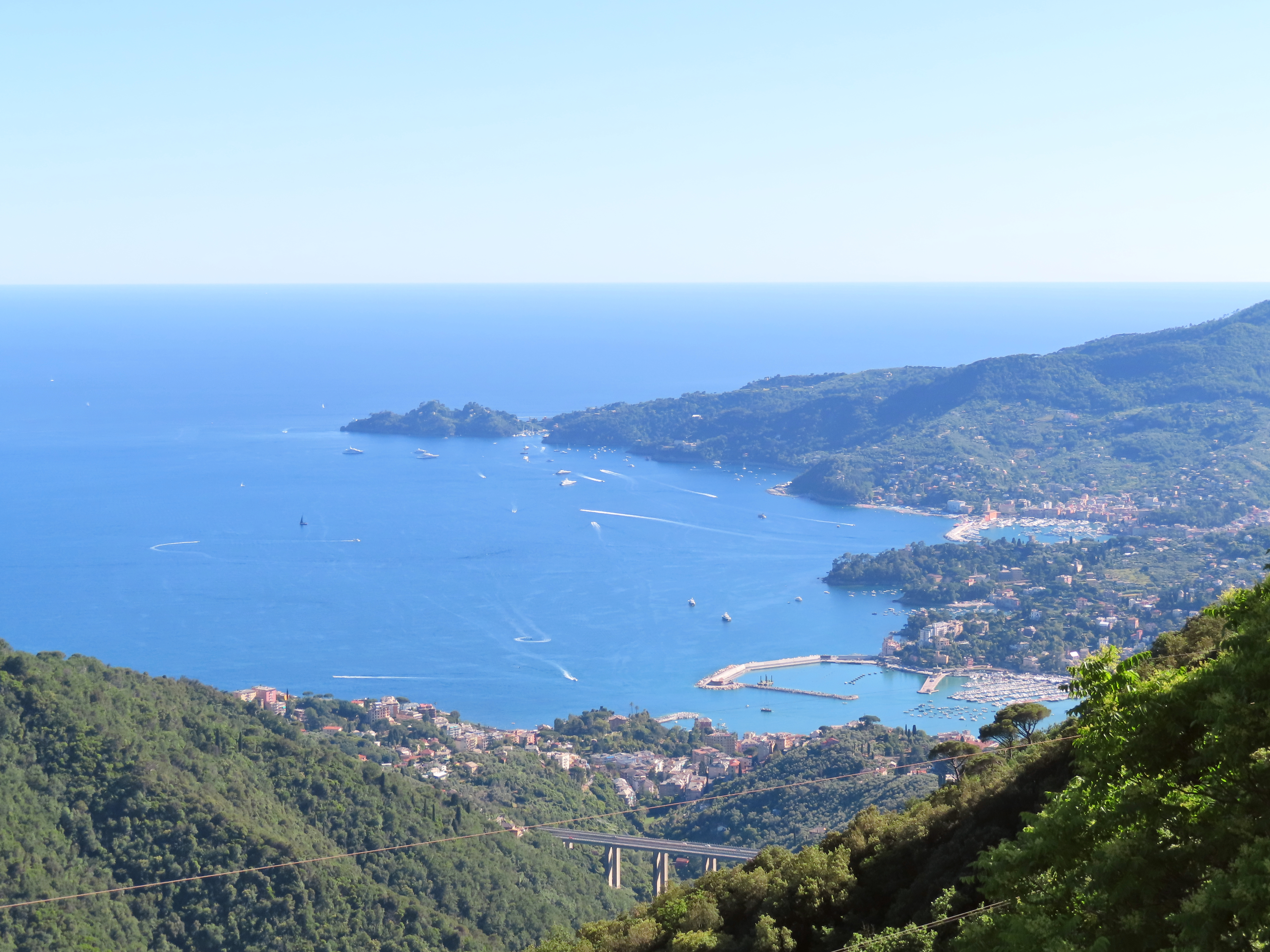
From the sanctuary, a view towards Rapallo and the Portofino mountain.

According to local tradition, several historical events that occurred in Rapallo are said to be related to the intervention of Our Lady of Montallegro. Among the most frequently cited miracles is that of the liberation of the Rapallo village from the plague in the 17th century and from cholera during the 19th century.

The plague had swept through the territory of Tigullio and the Republic of Genoa, unleashing death across the entire European continent. In the Ligurian region, an estimated 100,000 victims were calculated, most of them in Genoa, the maritime and commercial capital of the time. According to local sources, no deaths were recorded in the town of Rapallo due to the plague: this circumstance was considered by the locals as a first miracle of the Virgin Mary towards the city. The secular part of the city, on the other hand, has always emphasized that part of the credit for this should be given to the then podestà, who saved the city from the epidemic by effectively isolating the seaside village from the rest of the region with a cordon sanitaire. In any case, on May 29, 1657, the city council decided to go in procession to the sanctuary, a vow made by the community that is still fulfilled every year by the municipal authorities, and to donate a silver table to Our Lady.

During the cholera epidemic of 1835, the city council, chaired by Mayor Francesco Maria Pino Della Cella, made another pledge to the "patroness of the city", asking her for deliverance from the disease in exchange for a new silver tablet to be donated to the sanctuary as a token of gratitude and the allocation of 5,000 Piedmontese lire for the reconstruction of the sanctuary's façade. At the end of the epidemic, on the morning of May 23, 1836, at the Sanctuary of Montallegro, the municipal authorities, the clergy and individual citizens - who, according to an estimate by the Rapallo notary Michele Norero, numbered 5,000 - fulfilled the vow they had made the previous year and donated to the church a silver reproduction of the city of Rapallo, designed by the painter Tomaso Castello. The following year, on March 16, the city council donated a second silver plate, reproducing the coat of arms and the Byzantine image, which was then carried in procession on July 5, the now annual date of the city council's fulfillment of the vow.

Other local stories tell of the Virgin's protection of Rapallo during the Allied bombardment of July 28, 1944. Until then, the city had been relatively spared by the world conflict - compared to nearby towns such as Recco and Zoagli, which were almost flattened by the bombing of the local railroad bridges - although some bombs fell near the Basilica of Saints Gervasius and Protasius, destroying the eastern wing of the building and killing two people.

When the planes approached the city again, the fear of another heavy bombardment caused a general panic among the population. The air offensive began and bundles of bombs were dropped, but instead of detonations, the people of Rapallo heard a dull noise and saw columns of water rising from the sea: all the bombers had missed their target due to a sudden gust of wind. Some bombs also fell among the houses in the village, but they did not explode. The event immediately reminded the faithful of the figure of Our Lady of Montallegro, who, once again and according to religious tradition, had intervened to save the city.

== Description ==
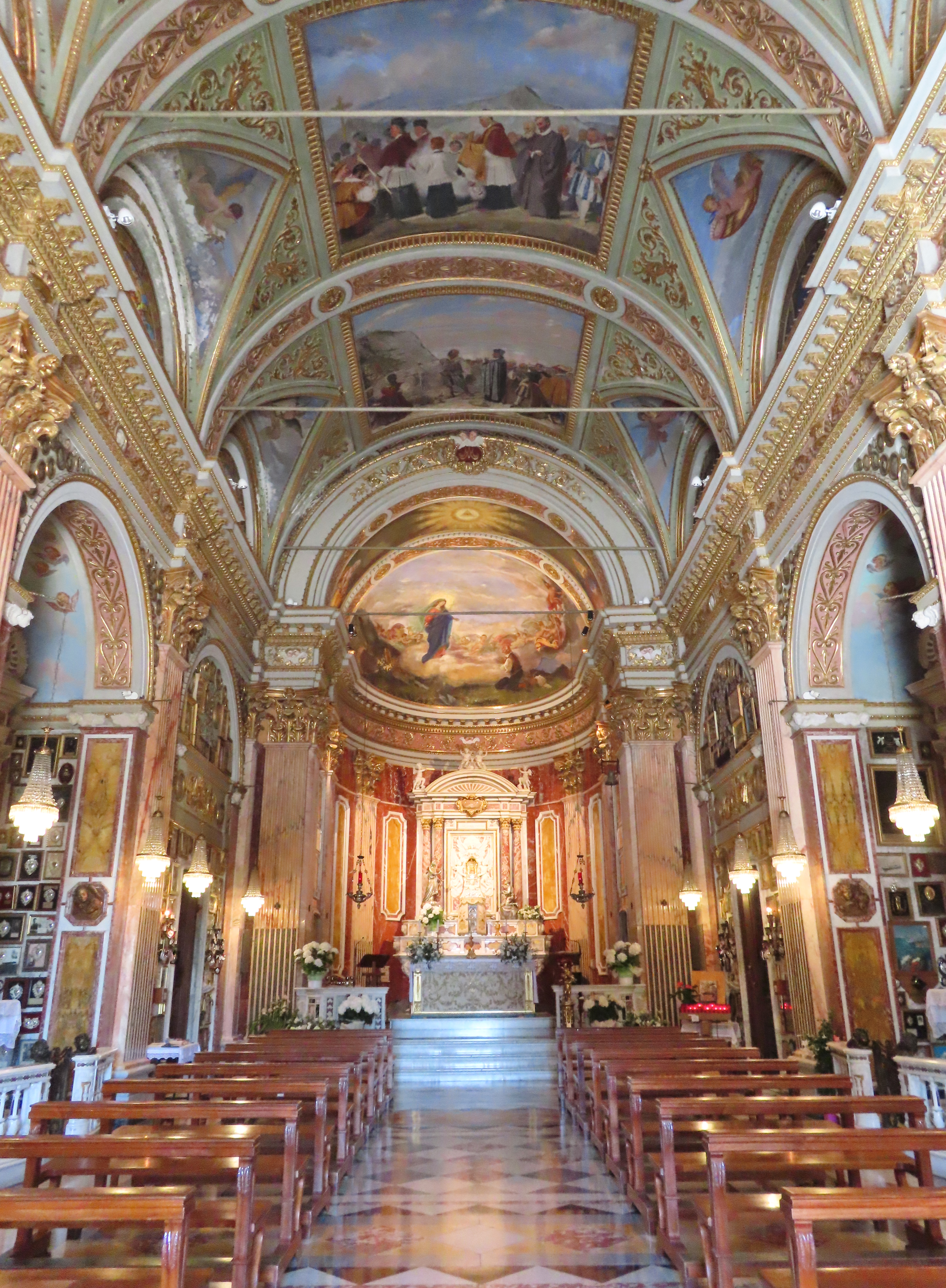
The nave

=== The church ===
The interior of the sanctuary, renovated and enlarged mainly in 1640, has a single nave with four side altars, plus the high altar where the small Byzantine painting is preserved and exposed to the veneration of the faithful, finally placed in 1743 in a Baroque silver pavilion donated by the nobleman Tomaso Noce.

At the first altar on the right side is the canvas of the Visitation by Nicola Carlone (1704); at the second altar is the white marble crucifix by Francesco Schiaffino. At the second altar on the left side is Luca Cambiaso's painting of the Annunciation and at the first altar is Nicolò Carlone's Our Lady of Sorrows (1707).

The frescoes and pictorial decorations of the vault and the semi-dome were painted, respectively, by Rapallo-based painters Francesco Boero - with the depiction, in four parts, of historical and "miraculous" events related to the figure of the Byzantine icon - and by the Genoese Nicolò Barabino, who above the high altar (a 19th-century work by Luigi Rovelli) depicted the scene of the Marian apparition to the peasant Giovanni Chichizola.

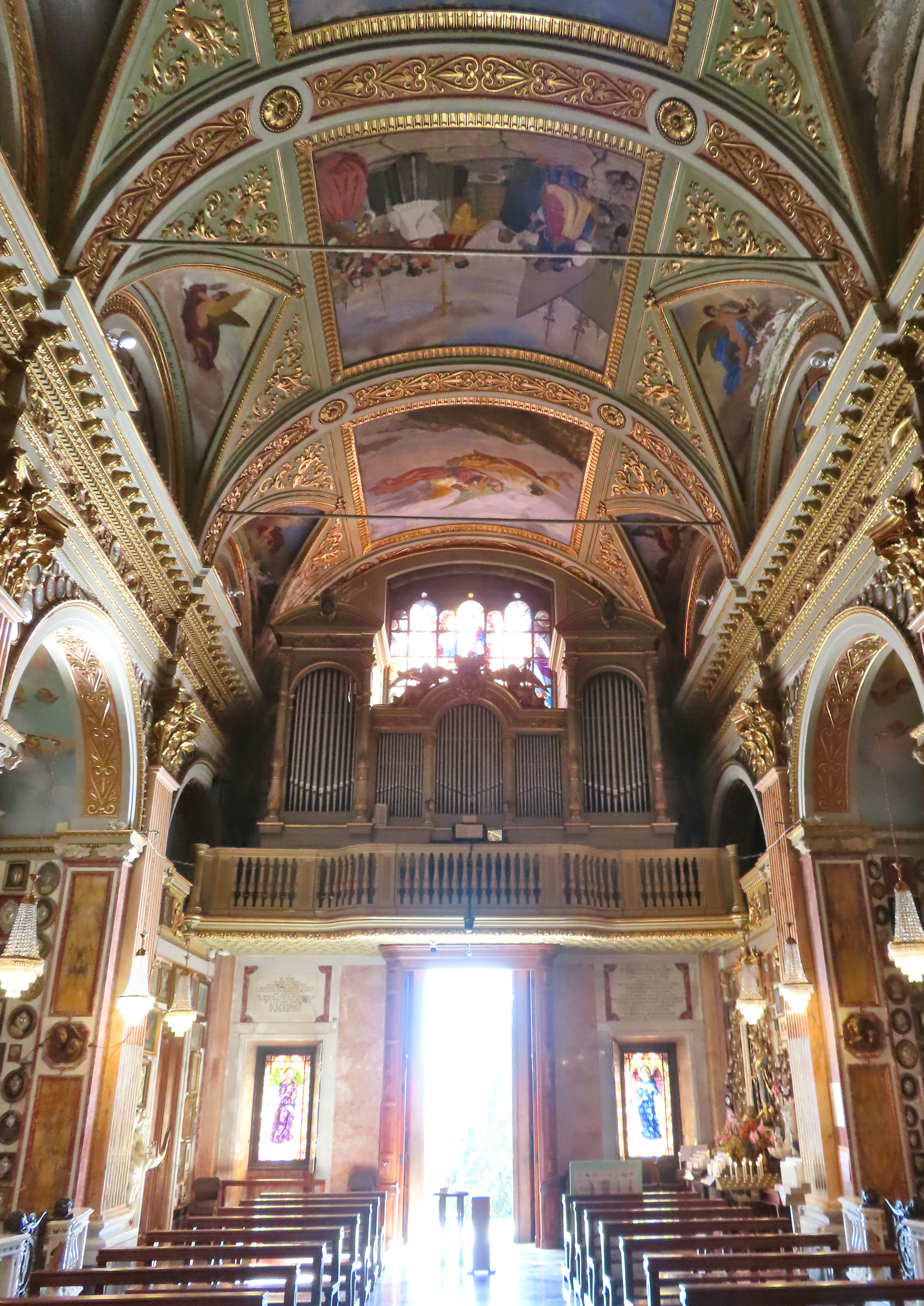
The counterfacade and the organ

The organ, from 1907, was built by the Inzoli firm of Crema.

The bell tower has 8 bells In DO3, cast by the award-winning Capanni foundry in Castelnovo ne' Monti (Re) in 1946.

=== The chapel of St. Joseph and the penitentiary ===
The sudden spring of water gushing from the rock is preserved in its original location at the chapel of St. Joseph. This religious space was created on the left side of the sanctuary, which was inaugurated on March 19, 1966 with a solemn ceremony. Inside are paintings, photographs and votive offerings donated by people who were allegedly miraculously healed through the intercession of Our Lady of Montallegro.

The penitentiary was erected in 1788, set up in the right wing of the sanctuary, and dedicated to St. Olcese Ursicino and Saints Gervasius and Protasius. The walls of the room are covered with the votive offerings and the tombstones and inscriptions placed after the visits of cardinals and other prominent personalities.

=== The Byzantine painting ===
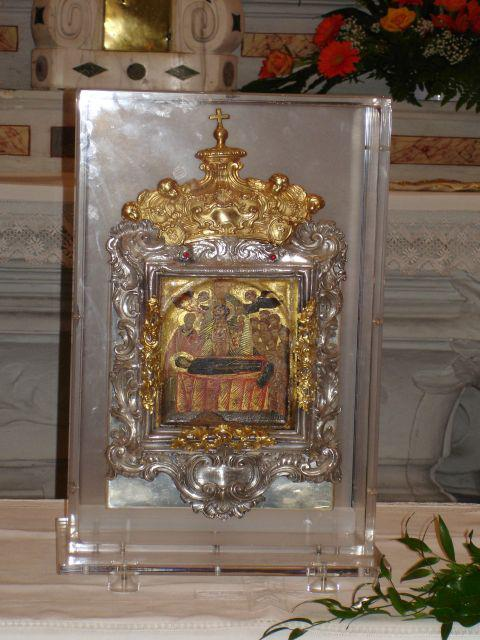
Display of the small Byzantine painting to the faithful

The small Byzantine painting kept in the sanctuary depicts the Virgin's transit to heaven. The icon, painted on a poplar wood tablet (18x15 cm), depicts the Holy Trinity and Our Lady's soul ascending to heaven at the moment of death. According to Christian belief, this icon is kept at the sanctuary at the behest of Our Lady herself.

According to tradition, mysterious disappearances and reappearances of the icon have occurred over time. Besides the initial event in 1557, another episode allegedly occurred in 1574. A ship from the Republic of Ragusa, led by Captain Nicola de Allegretis, was caught in a storm along the coast of Cinque Terre. The captain then made an appeal to God, vowing that if he survived the impending tragedy, he would go to the nearest sanctuary.

The ship managed to land along the coast of Rapallo, with the entire crew safe and sound; according to the promise made, the whole group then went to the local sanctuary of Montallegro to thank Our Lady. Upon arriving at the sanctuary, the crew members recognized on the altar the small Byzantine painting that, according to their testimonies, had disappeared from their church years earlier. This led to the inevitable accusation of theft against the people of Rapallo and the immediate demand for the return of the icon, which, after a favorable ruling by the Court of the Republic of Genoa, had to be placed in the hands of the captain.

The ship soon left the gulf, the captain rejoicing at having found the ancient relic, but a few miles from Rapallo a discovery was made: the small painting had disappeared from the cabin and there was no trace of it on the ship. The boat then returned to the coast of Rapallo and, after going back up to Montallegro, the sailors could admire with astonishment that the small painting was in its place on the high altar, just as they had found it on their first visit. In the sanctuary there is an ex-voto made by a certain Nicola de Allegretis, who is considered to be the captain himself.

Since then, the small painting has not left the sanctuary, as Our Lady allegedly requested, except for the processions on the occasion of the patronal festivities of the first three days of July. On the occasion of the 450th anniversary of the apparition of Our Lady - in 2007 - the Byzantine icon left the sanctuary to go, for the first time in the history of the sanctuary, to the parishes of the diocese of Chiavari, which belonged to the former captaincy of Rapallo (1608-1797).

It was in 1688 that, thanks to the work of the sculptor Antonio Floradi from Piacenza, the venerated image was engraved in copper and thus reproducible in the prints that followed. In the same year, the historian Antonio Molfino, in one of his writings, cites the popular devotion to this icon, which, together with the classical representation of the Marian apparition, was later taken up in many pictorial decorations of the houses in the center of Rapallo:

In the district of Rapallo there is no convent or family that does not keep two or three of the holy images or portraits of Our Lady of Montallegro in their homes: many ships carry them as a faithful escort over the stern: Many of them stand out on the facades of palaces, on the doors of houses, on the corners, on the walls of gardens, in the streets, in the suburbs, in the villas and in other areas, with vague mottos.

=== The ex-votos ===
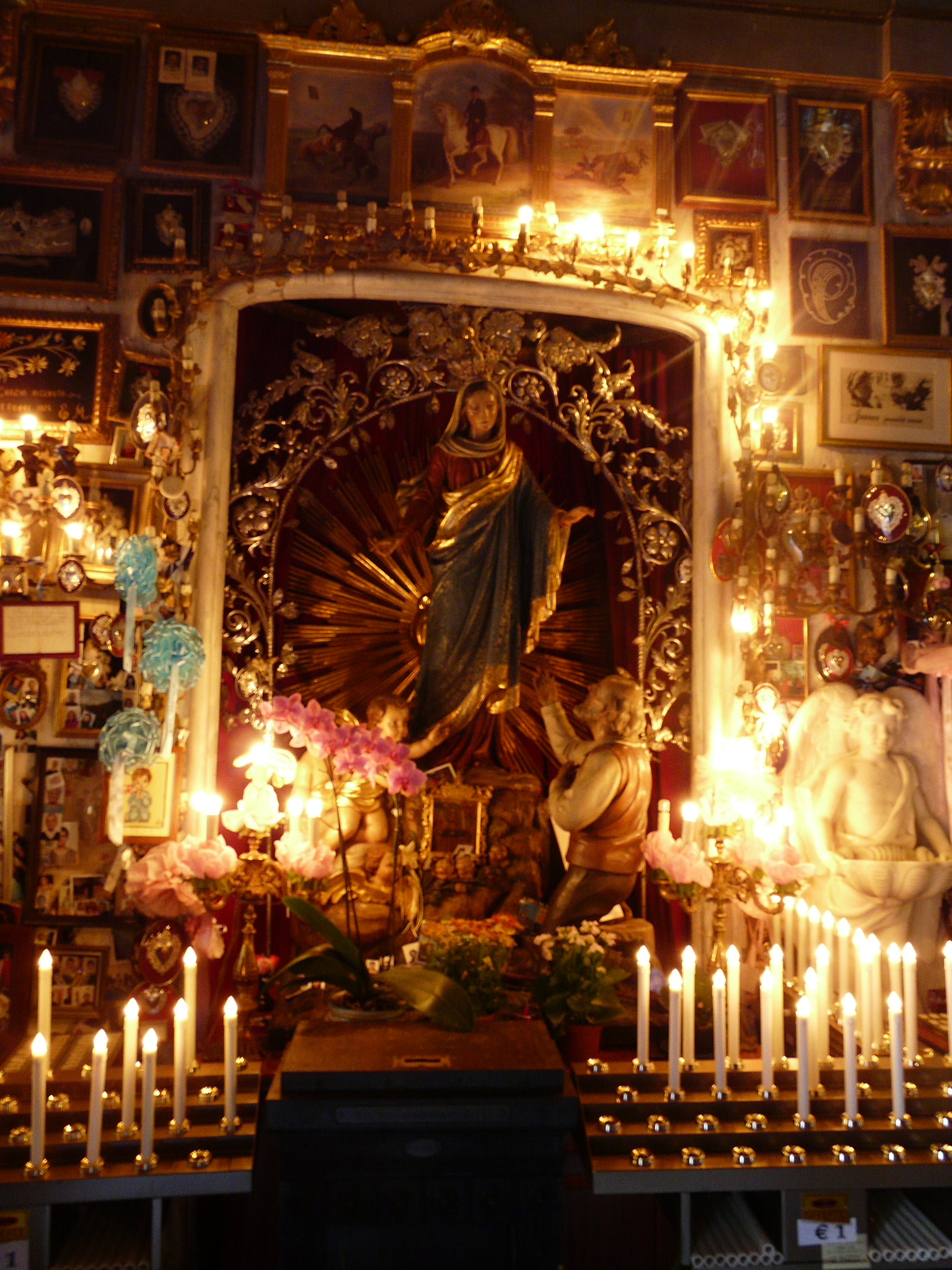
The statue of Our Lady of Montallegro surrounded, on either side, by the ex-votos.

Inside the sanctuary and other adjoining spaces there are numerous ex-votos, written testimonies or simple drawings donated for alleged graces received from the Virgin who appeared on the hill of Montallegro. The first was donated to the sanctuary in 1571 by Rapallo captain Agostino Canevale for having been saved in the Battle of Lepanto against the Turks; however, no trace remains of this donation as it was stolen by French soldiers during the Napoleonic domination of the late 18th and early 19th centuries.

The ex-voto of Captain Nicolò de Allegretis, a silver plate (measuring 43 x 39 cm) called and known as the "ex-voto of the Ragusan", dates back to 1574. The captain, on his way from Ragusa in Dalmatia, was struck by a storm and took refuge in the Gulf of Rapallo. So says the inscription:

DIE XXVI DECEMBRIS MDLXXllll APUD MONTEM RUSSUM DEIPARAE VIRGINI EGO NICOLAUS DE-ALLEGRETIS RACUSSINUS VOTUM ET GRATIAM ACCEPI.
December 26, 1574. Nicolò De Allegretis, the Ragusan, near Monterosso, made a vow to the Virgin Mary, Mother of God, and received the grace.

—(Ex-voto of the Ragusan)

The first ex-voto of the community of Rapallo was donated to the sanctuary in 1657 (the first centenary of the apparition) for saving the city from the plague. The silver plate (56.8 x 51.7 cm) depicts Rapallo in the second half of the 18th century, from the Langano dock (the port area) to the Da Vigo tower, with an accurate representation of the ancient houses of the old town along the marina, the Porta delle Saline and the medieval bridge over the San Francesco stream. In addition to the representation of the ancient course of the Boate stream (later diverted to its mouth in the first half of the 19th century), the ancient and almost original structure of the 16th century castle by the sea and the sanctuary can be seen from this plate, making the work, in addition to its religious value, an important visual testimony of "seventeenth century Rapallo".

DEIPARE MONTIS LETI COMMUNITAS RAPALLI A PESTE UNDIQUE GRASANTE IMMUNIS CAPITANEO ILLUSTRISSIMO IO PETRO GRIMALDO HOC GRATIANIMl. MONUMENTUM ANNO 1657 DICAVIT.
In the name of the community of Rapallo, immune to the plague that raged everywhere, the most illustrious Captain Gio. Pietro Grimaldi dedicated this testimony with gratitude to the Mother of God of Montallegro in 1657.

—(Ex-voto of deliverance from the plague)

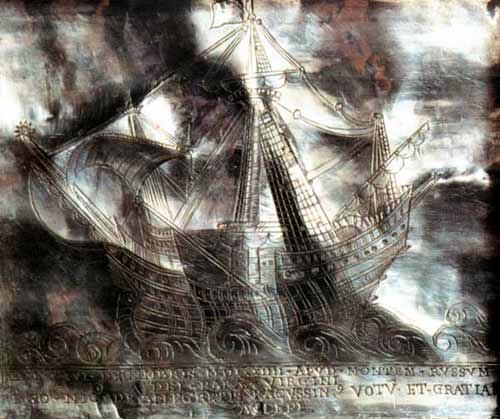
The ex-voto of the Ragusan captain De Allegretis (1574)

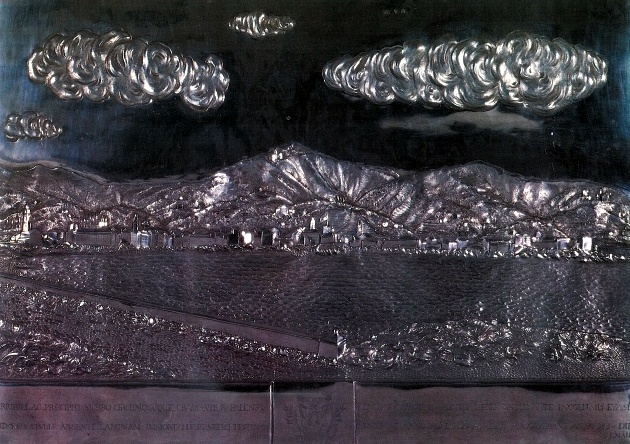
The ex-voto of the Rapallo community (1836)

The second ex-voto was given by the Republic of Genoa and the people of Rapallo on July 2, 1747, after the Genoese clashes against the Austro-Sardinians in the War of the Austrian Succession. The embossed silver foil (the work of Genoese engraver Luxardi and having the dimensions of 53.9 x 38.7 cm) depicts an eighteenth-century Rapallo village, with a precise detail of the city included between the mouth of the San Francesco and the Monastery of the Poor Clares.

D.O.M. RAPALENSIS POPULUS EX SPECIALI GRATIA DOMINAE SUAE ADVOCATAE, ET PATRONAE MARIAE MONTISLAETI AB AUSTRISARDO INCURSIONE ILLAESUS AD POSTERUM MEMORIAM ANNO MDCCXLVII D.D.D.
The people of Rapallo donated and dedicated in 1747 to the Almighty God, by the special grace of the Advocate, Our Lady and Patroness Mary of Montallegro, unharmed by the Austro-Sardinian invasion, to the memory of posterity.

—(Austro-Sardinian ex-voto)

Another depiction of the Rapallo coast, from the nineteenth-century period, can be seen from the third silver foil that the civic administration donated to Our Lady of Montallegro after the alleged liberation from cholera. The effigy (62 x 45 cm), in addition to a panorama of the town from Langano harbor, also shows the new road to Santa Margherita Ligure that was built in 1823 after the detour of the Boate stream.

TERRIBILI AC PRAECIPITI MORBO CIRCUMQUAQUE GRASSANTE RAPALENSIS CIVITAS VIRGINE MONTIS LAETI OPITULANTE INCOLUMIS EVASIT ORDO ET CIVEIS ARGENTI LAMINAM IMMORTALIS BENEFICI TESTIMONIUM VOVEBANT ANNO 1835 DIE 22 AUGUSTI PERSOLVEBANT ANNO 1836 DIE 23 MAII
The city of Rapallo, devastated by the terrible and deadly disease, was saved by the Virgin of Montallegro. On August 22, 1835, the mayor and the citizens vowed a silver foil as a testimony of an immortal benefit, and fulfilled the vow on May 23, 1836.

—(Ex-voto of liberation from cholera)

Also among the ex-votos preserved is that of Queen Margherita of Savoy donated to the sanctuary on January 30, 1905, to commemorate her late husband King Umberto I of Savoy, who was killed in Monza in 1900 by an anarchist.

Next to the church, in a room where nuns sell religious objects and books, a three-meter-long stuffed crocodile hangs from the ceiling. It is said to be the strange tribute of a Rapallo commander returning from the Amazon, who brought it there almost three centuries ago.

=== The silver casket ===
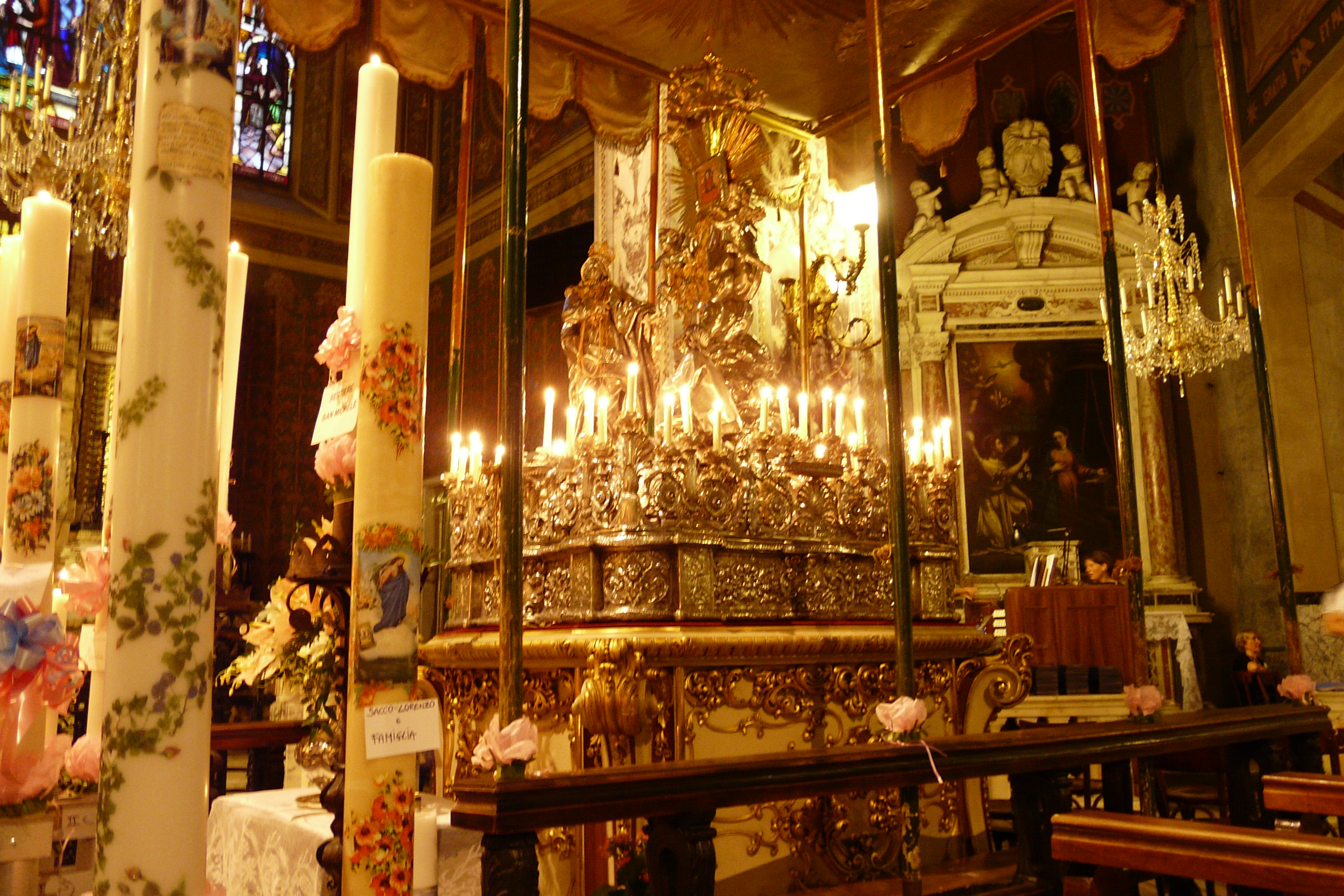
The ceremonial casket displayed for the veneration of the faithful at the basilica of Saints Gervasius and Protasius.

The first silver casket was made by a Genoese goldsmith on commission from the administrators of the basilica of Saints Gervasius and Protasius in 1698. It consisted of a faithful reproduction of the small Byzantine painting, on a pedestal, surrounded by images of Our Lady of the Rosary, Saints Gervasius and Protasius, St. Blaise and St. Erasmus. More than 350 ounces of silver were used for the work at a total expense of 1,750 Genoese liras.

On March 22, 1779 the icon of the Virgin, surrounded by angels holding the crown above the reproduction of the miraculous cliff, was added to the casket, while in 1782 the municipal coat of arms, also in silver, also was set on the ark.

During the Austrian occupation of Rapallo in 1799 (which formed a provisional local government there) the silver ark was taken from the sanctuary with the intention of melting down its gold and silver for the Austrian Empire. The people of Rapallo, however, managed to redeem the entire ark at an expense of 4,126 liras, but erased its municipal coat of arms by provisions of a special Austrian decree.

It was further restored in 1838, with the new elements covered in silver, safeguarding with masterly care the elements made earlier. The cost was considerable, 20,097 Piedmontese lire, but thanks to the efforts of the six city districts, the money was easily raised.

The golden crown worn by the Virgin, dated 1844, was donated by the Rapallo lacemakers; the value of the object was estimated at 1,400 Piedmontese lire.

== Patronal festivals ==
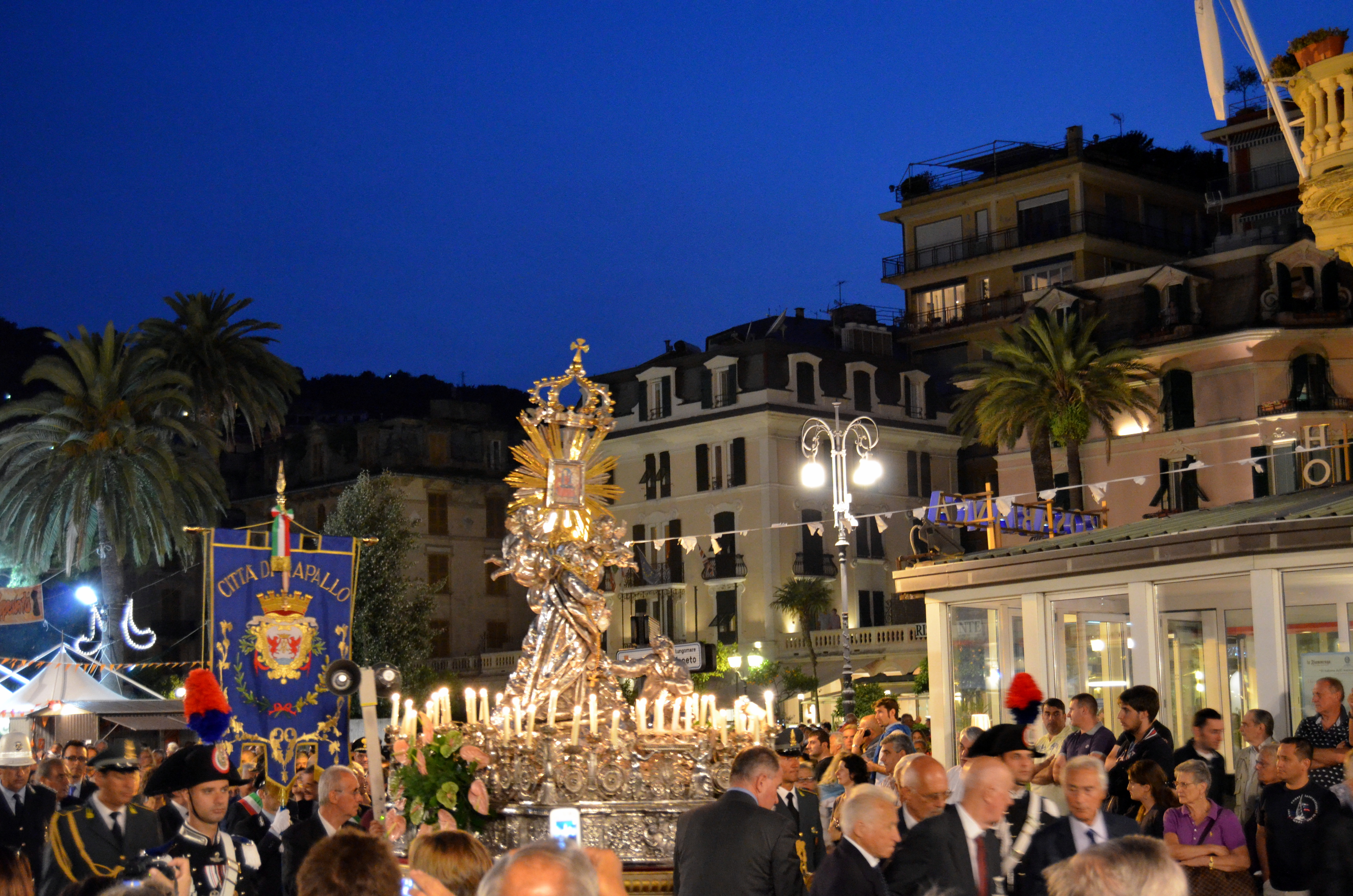
The July 3 procession on the Rapallese waterfront with the silver casket of Our Lady of Montallegro

=== The "July Festivities" ===
The festivities dedicated to the patron saint - known in Rapallo as the "July festivities" - take place over three days, July 1, 2 and 3, days on which the city's six districts (Borzoli, Cappelletta, Cerisola, Costaguta, Seglio and San Michele) put on nightly fireworks displays. Every year, in rotation, a district is chosen to be entrusted with the task of honoring Our Lady, especially in the "Midday Panegyric."

On the morning of July 1, at exactly 8 a.m., the districts greet the "messa in cassa" (that is, when the gold and silver statue of Our Lady of Montallegro is placed on the silver ark) and then displayed to the faithful and authorities inside the basilica of Saints Gervasius and Protasius.

The first shot as is customary "ou l'è au Langan" (at the Langano pier) i.e. it is up to the District of St. Michael to begin the tribute to Our Lady with a mortar shot, followed in order by the responses of the districts of Seglio-San Rocco, Borzoli, Cerisola, Cappelletta and finally Costaguta (called reciammi in local parlance, the "calls"), carried out with Ligurian mortars, almost signifying a sort of popular Rosary.

Within this sort of rotation, two districts, in rotation over the years, (due to security constraints) perform a "daytime" fireworks display from the barges positioned in the center of the stretch of water in front of the seafront promenade.

In the evening, after the various salutes of the districts, the fireworks illuminate the Rapallo water surface. While waiting for the fireworks display (which on the three evenings features the participation of two districts at a time), small lamps called lumetti rapallini (small cylindrical objects made of strong paper containing a lit wax candle) are placed in the sea.

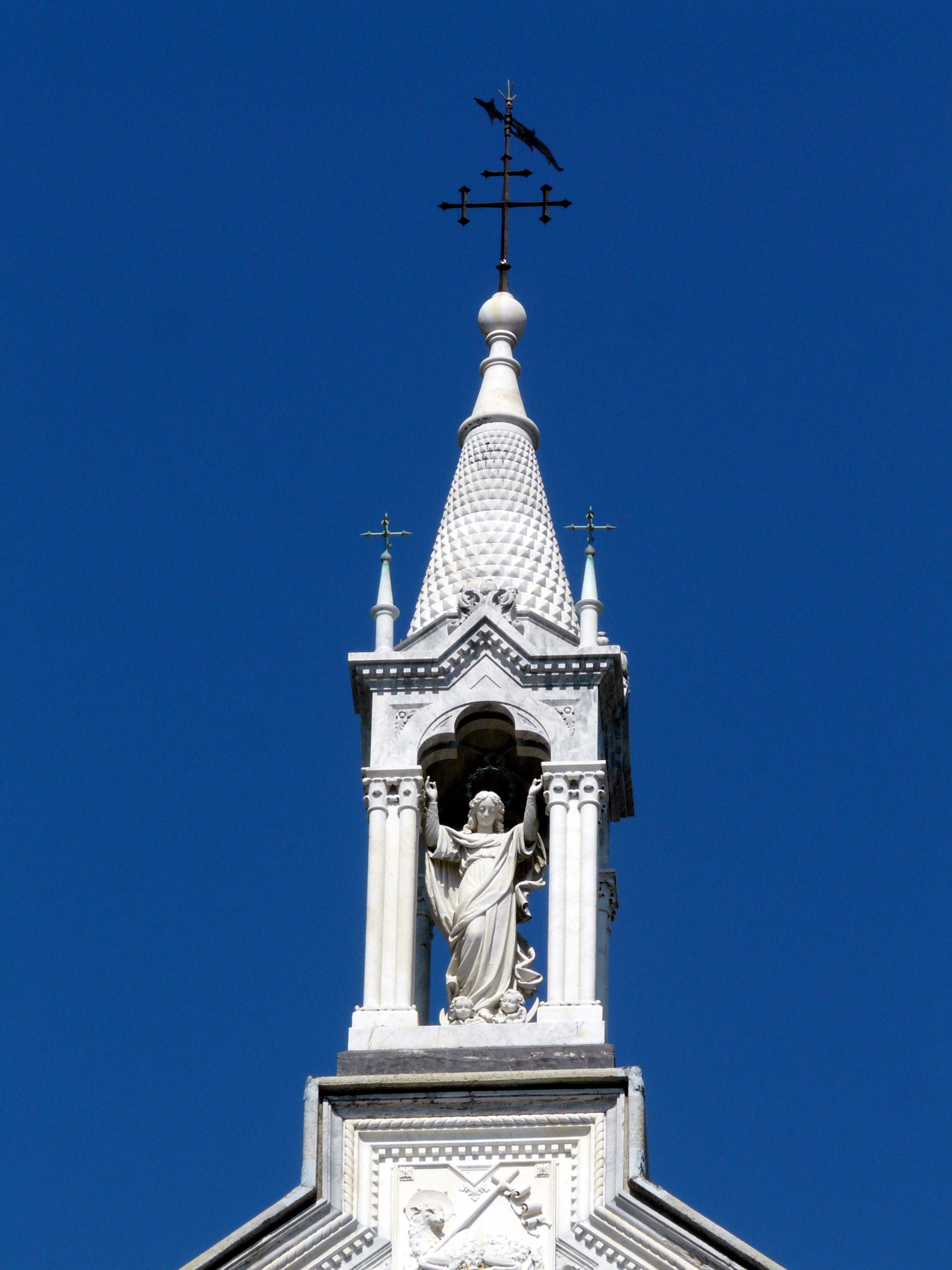
Detail of a spire on the facade

On the following day, the anniversary of the apparition, at noon the district on duty organizes the so-called "Panegyric". In the pedestrian area of the Vittorio Veneto Promenade, numerous fireworks are placed and when they reach the height of the Christopher Columbus monument, in the Lido area, towards the mouth of the Boate stream, a great roar (known in Rapallo as "u ramadan") accompanies the final spectacle.

Particularly evocative is the last evening of the festivities, July 3, when a long procession composed of the bearers of Christ and the silver ark with the Madonna of Montallegro crosses the city center and the waterfront. Finally, of particular interest is the scenic "burning" of the castle by the sea, obviously simulated and of purely symbolic value, with red smoke and fires cascading over the sea.

Before the burning of the castle, a fireworks display is held, known as the "shooting of the boys", so called because in ancient times it was the younger ones who were in charge, under the watchful eye of the older "massari"; today only the name remains, since the enormous security restrictions require that all "massari" be of age and have a special license.

=== The mascoli ===
The use of mascoli (or Ligurian mortars), i.e., small cannons filled with gunpowder, has been documented since 1619. In the Tigullio and Golfo Paradiso they continue to be used only in the areas near Rapallo and Recco due to severe restrictions imposed by law enforcement.

The mascolo cannot and should not be equated with an ordinary firework: its operation is inherently safer (though less spectacular). In fact, the mortar does not rise from the ground and throw anything upwards (except for a small cap of sawdust), it produces a simple impact on the ground and is ignited according to 400-year-old techniques and rituals.

The Ligurian mortar is therefore the real "ancient heart" of the pyrotechnic events in this area of Eastern Genoa, where commercial pyrotechnics coexist with the ancient cultural and popular pyrotechnics.

== Access to the sanctuary ==
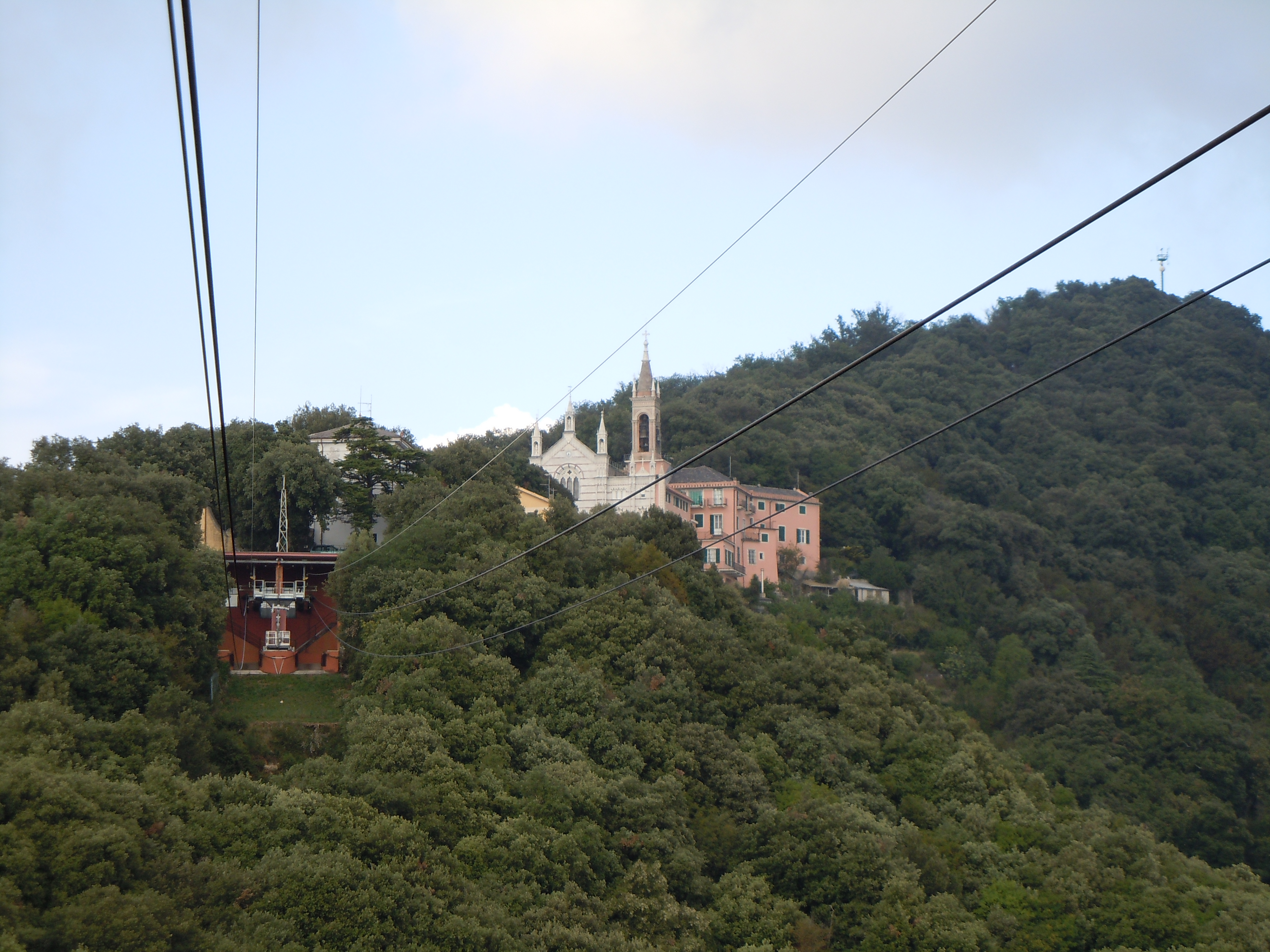
The mountain station of the cable car

=== Road ===
The sanctuary can be reached from the center of Rapallo along a road that was completed in 1932 and is about 10 km long. The first itinerary, which starts from the popular Via Betti, follows the Crocetta SP58, which runs along the San Francesco stream, and passes through the hamlet of San Maurizio di Monti, linking the coast to the Crocetta pass (from the pass it is possible to go down to the Coreglia Ligure plain, again as SP58, and then to the central Fontanabuona valley) and continues along the scenic road to the sanctuary forecourt.

=== Mule tracks ===
Other historical accesses to the sanctuary have been provided since ancient times by the various mule tracks that allow to reach the site from Rapallo, by walking along the so-called "salita del Pellegrino" at the little church of San Bartolomeo di Borzoli, and from the towns of Uscio, Cicagna, Zoagli and Chiavari, through the passes and crossings along the Rapallo ridge.

Along the mule track that climbs to Monte Rosa (694 m) there are the fourteen Stations of the Cross, blessed on May 3, 1942 by Monsignor Amedeo Casabona, Bishop of Chiavari.

The road leading to the "Pilgrim's House", which is much easier than the first one, makes it possible to reach the Chiavari coast, passing through woods and dense vegetation. Along the pedestrian path are the aedicules of the fifteen mysteries of the Rosary, bronze panels created by the sculptor Italo Primi from Rapallo, inaugurated and blessed between 1957 and 1958.

=== Means of transportation ===
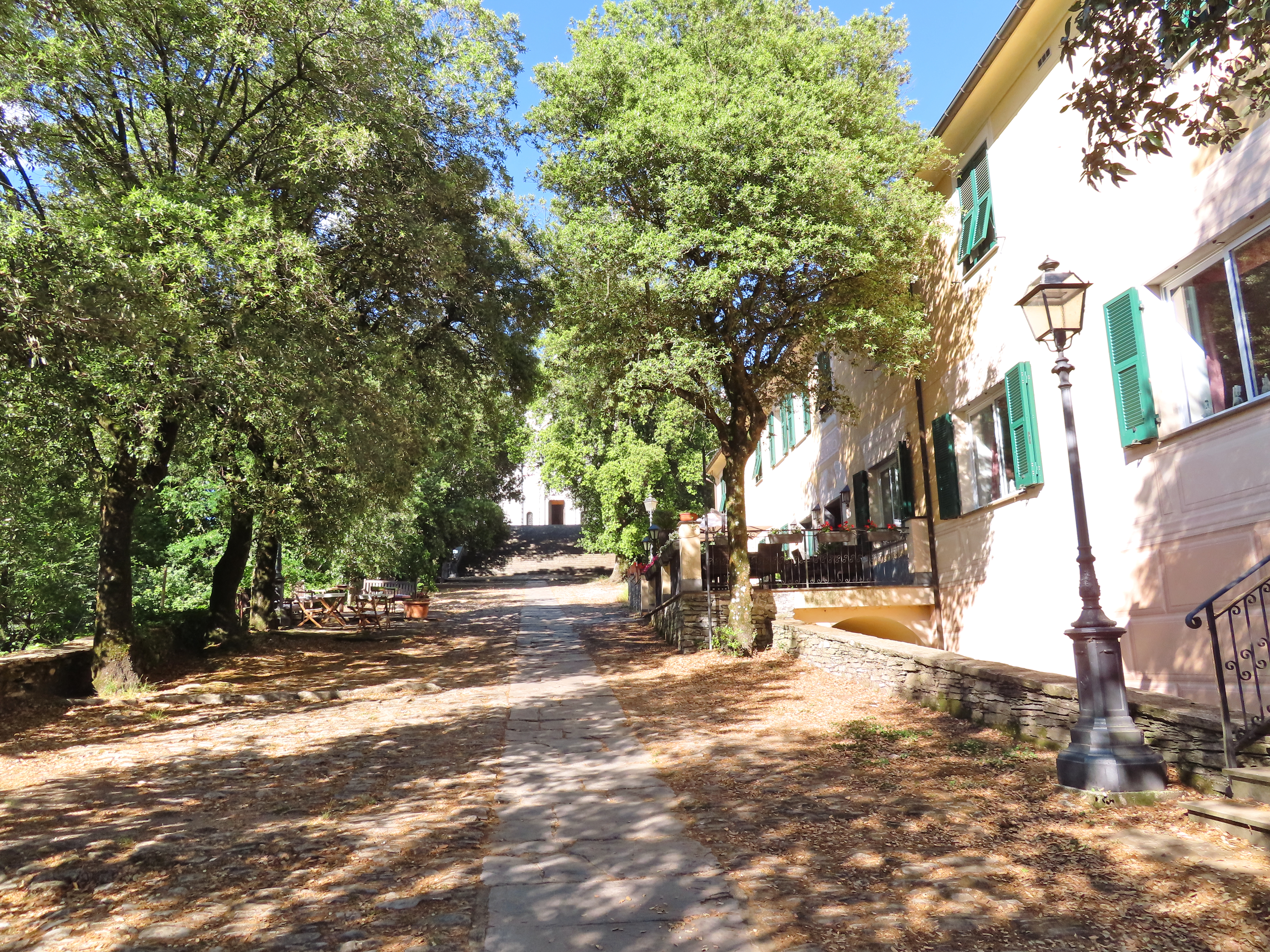
The avenue lined with holm oaks at the sanctuary

In addition to a special public transport service (buses) from the Rapallo terminal, it is possible to reach the sanctuary by cable car (inaugurated in 1934), which is open almost all year round and was renovated in the 2000s with the most modern safety systems. The ride takes about 7-8 minutes, and during the ride there is a panoramic view of the Gulf of Rapallo and the inlets of Santa Margherita Ligure and Portofino.

== See also ==
- Rapallo

== Bibliography ==
- Bacigalupo, Maria Angela. Ex voto a Montallegro. Rapallo: Comune di Rapallo.
- Barni, Gianluigi (1983). Storia di Rapallo e della gente del Tigullio. Genova: Liguria - Edizioni Sabatelli.
- Berri, Pietro (1979). Rapallo nei secoli. Rapallo: Edizioni Ipotesi.
- Bacigalupo, Maria Angela (1994). Montallegro ed il mare: la quadreria degli ex voto marimari.
- Bacigalupo, Maria Angela (1989). Ex voto a Montallegro.
- Bacigalupo, Maria Angela (1998). Il Santuario di N.S. di Montallegro.
- Ricci, Umberto (1994). Montallegro ed il mare.
- Ricci, Umberto (1980). Rapallo sacra minore. Ex voto di N.S. di Montallegro.
- Meriana, Giovanni (1990). Guida ai Santuari in Liguria. Genova: Sagep Editrice.
- Cammilleri, Rino (2020). Tutti i giorni con Maria, calendario delle apparizioni. Milano: Edizioni Ares.
