= San Nicolo dell'isola di Sestri Levante =

Roman Catholic parish church in Sestri Levante, Liguria, Italy

San Nicolò dell'isola di Sestri Levante
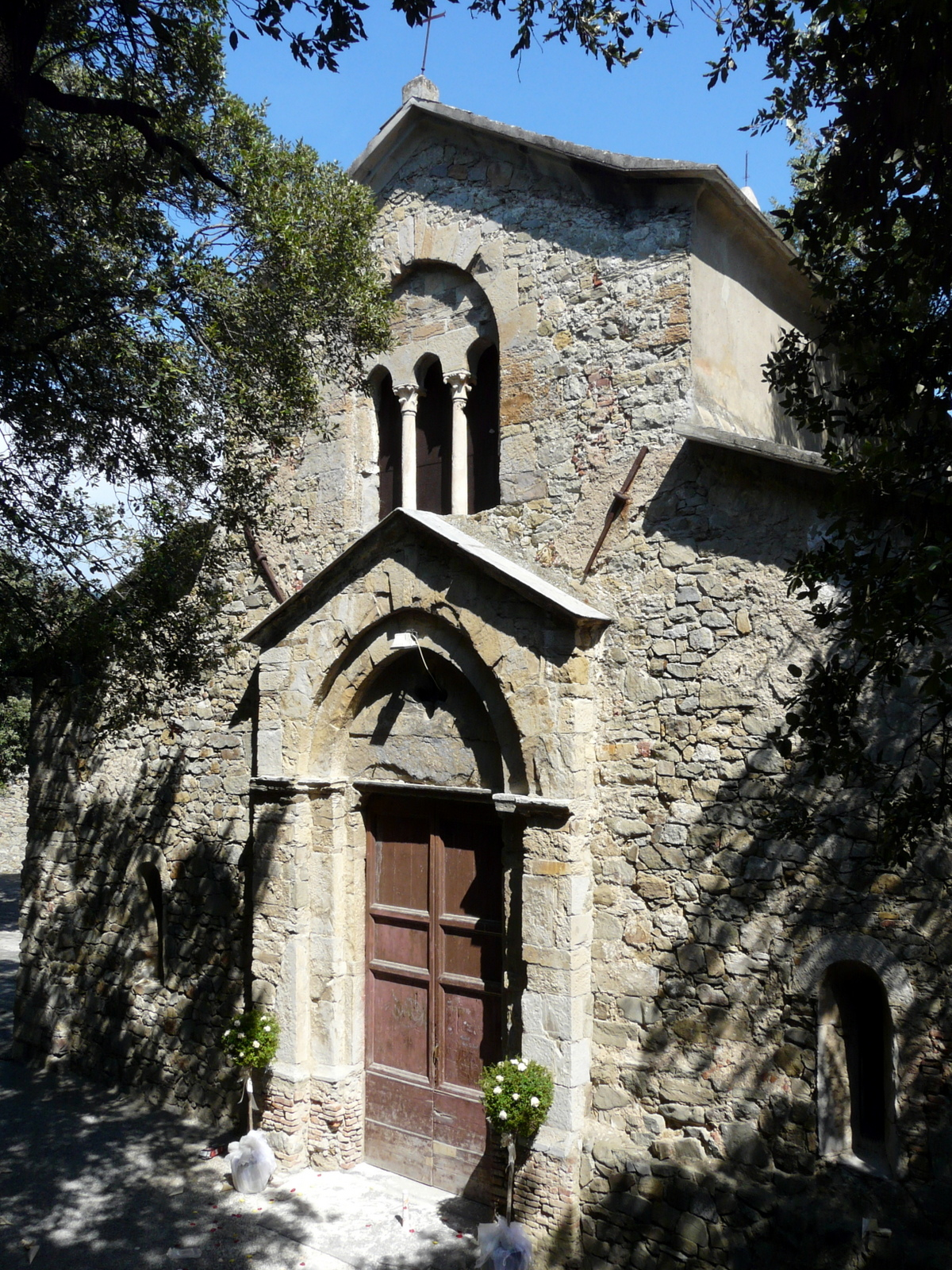

Religion
- Affiliation: Roman Catholic Church
- Year consecrated: 1151

Location
- Location: Sestri Levante, Italy
- Interactive map of San Nicolò dell'isola di Sestri Levante
- Coordinates: 44.2680°N 9.3898°E

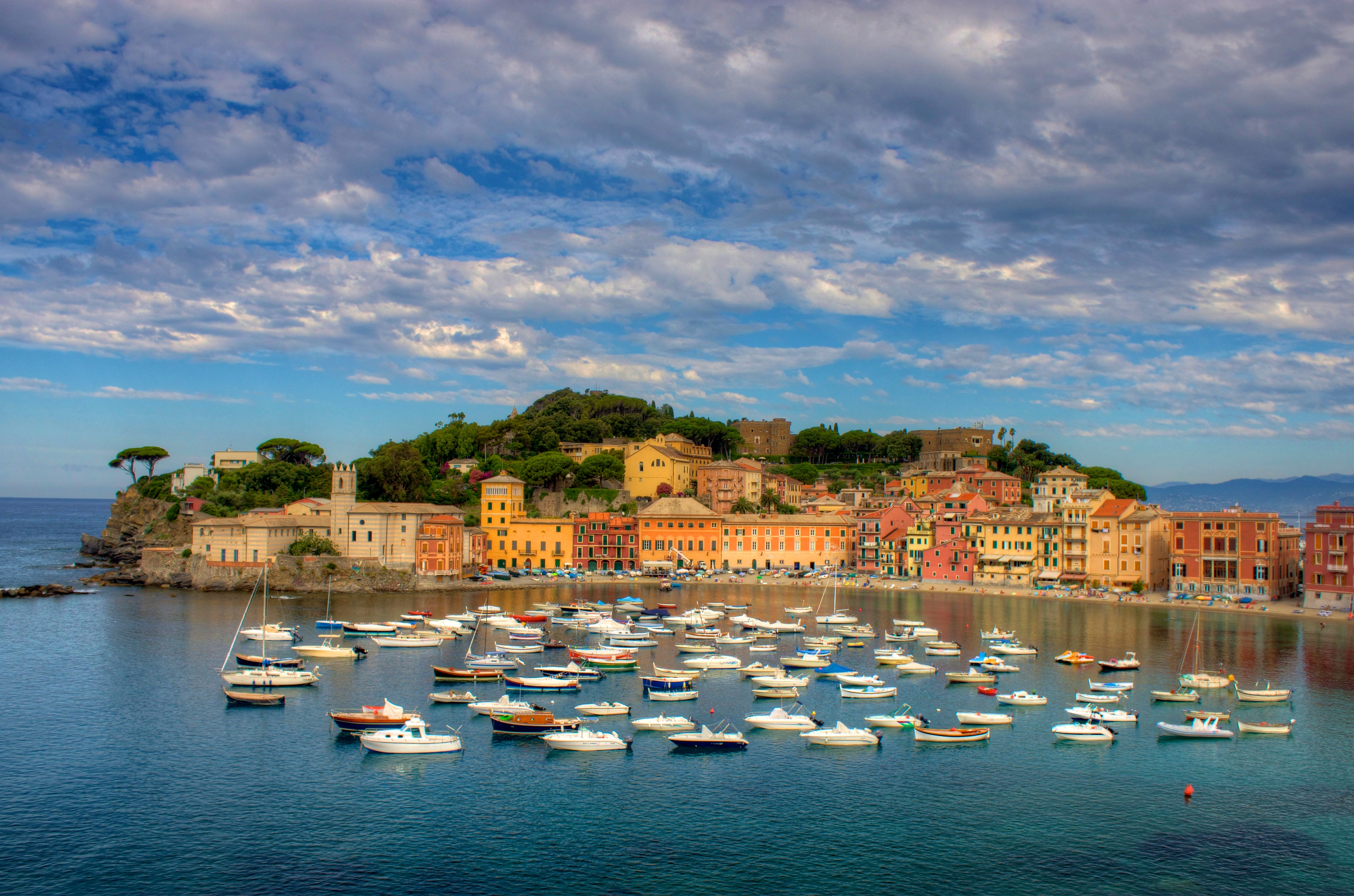
Sestri Levante and Baia del Silenzio, the Bay of Silence

San Nicolò dell'isola is a Romanesque style, Roman Catholic parish church in the town of Sestri Levante, in the Liguria, Italy. The temple's construction dates from the 12th to the 17th century.

Built originally in 1151, the building, including the facade, was partially reconstructed in the 15th century. and further altered during the Baroque period. More recent renovations have highlighted some of the original structure. The façade has a pseudo-portal porch topped by a triple lancet window, the sides are walled medieval tombstones and inscriptions, in the left, a fragment of the 8th-century chancel enclosure. The bell tower has a pyramid-shaped spire. The interior has three naves divided by columns with cubic capitals.

== See also ==
- Sestri Levante
- Basilica di Santa Maria di Nazareth
- Diocese of Chiavari
