= Mary of Nazareth (disambiguation) =

Mary of Nazareth was the mother of Jesus in Christian tradition.

Mary of Nazareth may also refer to:

- Mary of Nazareth (film), a 2012 television film
- Mary of Nazareth Parish (Brooklyn), a Catholic parish in New York City

== See also ==
- Santa Maria di Nazareth (disambiguation)
