= Diocese of Chiavari =

Roman Catholic diocese in Italy

Coordinates: 44.3167°N 9.3333°E

Diocese of Chiavari Dioecesis Clavarensis

Catholic
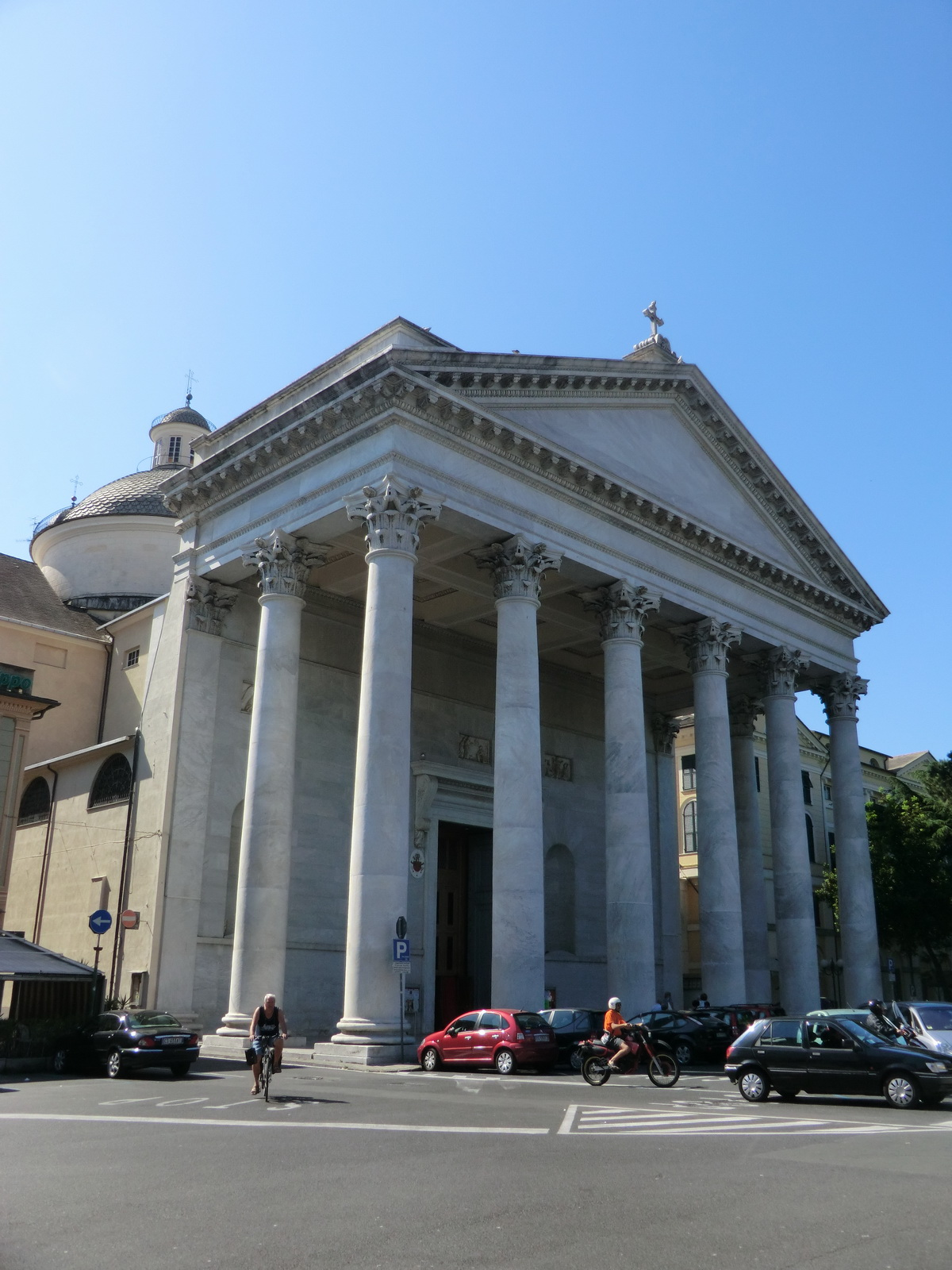

Location
- Country: Italy
- Ecclesiastical province: Genoa

Statistics
- Area: 559 km^{2} (216 sq mi)
- Population: Total; Catholics: (as of 2021); 142,600 (est.); 137,430 (est.)
- Parishes: 140

Information
- Denomination: Catholic Church
- Rite: Roman Rite
- Established: 3 December 1892
- Cathedral: Cattedrale di Nostra Signora dell’Orto e di Montallegro
- Secular priests: 93 (diocesan); 23 (Religious Orders); 8 Permanent Deacons

Current leadership
- Pope: Leo XIV
- Bishop: Giampio Luigi Devasini

Map
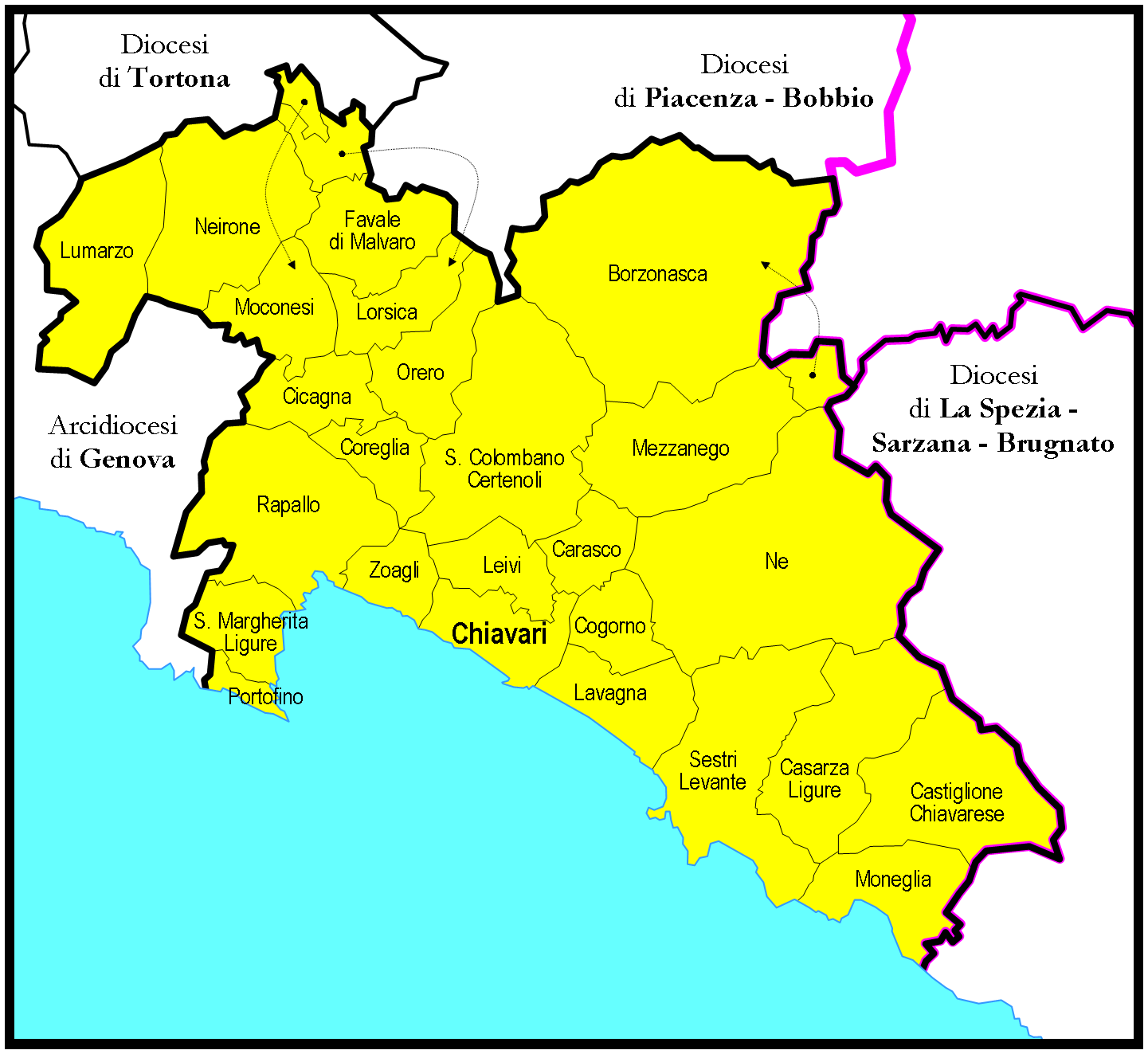

Website
- Diocesi di Chiavari

The Diocese of Chiavari (Latin: Dioecesis Clavarensis) is a Latin diocese of the Catholic Church in Liguria, northern Italy. It was created on 3 December 1892 by Pope Leo XIII in the Bull Romani Pontifices. It is a suffragan of the Archdiocese of Genoa.

== History ==
Chiavari became an episcopal see in 1892, but until 1896 it was administered by Tommaso Reggio, the Archbishop of Genoa, to which diocese it originally belonged, through his auxiliary bishop and vicar general, Fortunato Vinelli, titular bishop of Epiphania (Cilicia, Ottoman Empire). The first bishop of Chiavari was Fortunato Vinelli. He was officially transferred from Genoa to the diocese of Chiavari by Pope Leo XIII on 29 March 1896.

The creation of a new diocese, a rare event in the modern Church in Italy, was a solution to the rapid growth of population in Genoa due to industrialization. In the bull Romani Pontifices Pope Leo notes that the city of Chiavari had a population surpassing 12,000, and that requests for the creation of a diocese also came from Rapalla, Lavania, and Santa Margharita. In fact, pressure had been building for more than a decade. A not inconsequential factor, as the Pope admits, came from the testamentary bequest in 1884 of one-third of the estate of Francesco Bancalari, a priest of Chiavari, which was earmarked for the creation of a diocese of Chiavari, if and when the Holy See acted positively. A final consideration, as far as timing was concerned, was the death of the Archbishop of Genoa, Salvatore Magnasco, on 12 January 1892. Arrangements could be made for the new diocese with a new archbishop, who was appointed on 11 July, without insult or diminution of the status and powers of the recently deceased Archbishop.

The first diocesan synod was held by Bishop Vinelli in 1899, with 240 priests participating. The second synod was held by Bishop Casabona in 1921, and the third on 17–19 October 1933. The Fourth Diocesan Synod was held by Bishop Daniele Ferrari in 1987.

On 5 July 1899 the new seminary, named in honor of Leo XIII, was blessed by Archbishop Reggio of Genoa. The old seminary had been established by the Archbishop of Genoa, Cardinal Luigi Lambruschini (1819–1830).

=== Cathedral and Chapter ===
The church which was designated as the new cathedral was built between 1613 and 1633 as a shrine for the image of the Virgin Mary which was given credit for stopping the pestilence of 1493. Administration of the church was put in the hands of the Discalced Carmelites, until all religious orders were suppressed under orders of the French occupation authorities in 1797. A reconstruction was begun in 1823, with a façade designed by an architect called Luigi Poletti. The new façade and pronaos of the Cathedral was blessed by Cardinal Andrea Ferrari in 1907.

In accordance with the bull of erection of Leo XIII, the Cathedral Chapter was to consist of ten Canons. It was to be presided over by a Provost, and there was to be a Canon Theological and a Canon Penitentiary. The cathedral was granted the status of a minor basilica by Pope Pius X on 27 November 1904.

The current bishop is Giampio Luigi Devasini, appointed on 10 April 2021 by Pope Francis.

== Bishops ==
- 1893–1910: Fortunato Vinelli
- 1911–1916: Giovanni Gamberoni
- 1917–1917: Natale Serafino
- 1917–1948: Amedeo Casabona
- 1948–1971: Francesco Marchesani
- 1971–1973: Luigi Maverna
- 1973–1995: Daniele Ferrari
- 1995–2004: Alberto Maria Careggio
- 2004–2021: Alberto Tanasini
- 2021–........: Giampio Luigi Devasini

== Parishes ==
The diocese has 139 parishes, all within the province of Genoa, including several parishes transferred from the diocese of La Spezia (and several transferred to La Spezia) on 26 July 1959. The diocesan web site maintains a current list of parishes, divided into five Vicariates.

Borzonasca: S. Bartolomeo Apostolo, S. Giovanni Battista, S. Margherita V, S. Maria Assunta, S. Vincenzo e Anastasio, S. Rocco, S. Maria Assunta, S. Andrea Apostolo, S. Lorenzo, S. Martino

Carasco: S. Marziano, S. Pietro, S. Eufemiano, S. Nicolò, S. Quirico, S. Maria

Casarza Ligure: Nostra Signora della Speranza, S. Lorenzo, S. Maria Assunta, S. Martino, S. Michele Arcangelo, S. Bernardo e SS. Concezione

Castiglione Chiavarese: S. Antonino Martire, S. Pietro, S. Rocco e Gaetano, S. Michele, S. Maria Assunta, S. Martino

Chiavari: N. S. della Pace e di S. Bernardo, S. Andrea, S. Giacomo di Rupinaro, S. Giovanni Battista, S. Giuseppe, S. Maria e S. Biagio di Bacezza, S. Michele, S. Margherita, S. Martino, S. Pietro, San Pier di Canne, S. Antonino Martire

Cicagna: S. Giovanni Battista, S. Rocco, S. Bartolomeo

Cogorno: S. Antonino Martire, S. Lorenzo, S. Maria, S. Colombano, S. Salvatore

Coreglia Ligure: S. Martino, S. Nicolò, S. Giacomo

Favale di Malvaro: S. Vincenzo Martire, S. Martino, S. Bernardo, Lavagna, S. Giulia, S. Maria del Ponte, S. Maria Madre della Chiesa, S. Stefano, S. Pietro, S. Concezione, S. Maria Assunta

Leivi: S. Rufino, S. Tommaso, S. Michele

Lorsica: S. Maria, S. Giuseppe, N. S. dell’Orto, S. Andrea

Lumarzo: S. Margherita, S. Maria Maddalena, S. Tommaso, S. Stefano, S. Maurizio

Mezzanego: S. Maria Assunta, S. Maria della Neve, S. Michele Arcangelo, S. Siro

Moconesi: S. Cuore e di S. Margherita, S. Giuseppe e Margherita, S. Ambrogio, S. Giacomo

Moneglia: S. Croce, S. Giorgio, S. Maria Assunta, S. Saturnino

Ne: S. Cipriano e Giustina, S. Lorenzo, S. Biagio, S. Maria Assunta, S. Maria e Michele, S. Bartolomeo, S. Pietro, S. Antonio, S. Apollinare

Neirone: S. Maurizio, S. Marco, S. Rocco, S. Lorenzo

Orero: S. Ambrogio, S. Michele Arcangelo

Portofino: S. Martino

Rapallo: S. Andrea, S. Anna, S. Maria del Campo, S. Martino, S. Massimo, S. Pietro, Quirico

San Colombano Certenoli: S. Maria, S. Maurizio, S. Michele, S. Stefano, S. Trinità, S. Bernardo, S. Maria Assunta, S. Martino del Monte, S. Colombano, S. Giacomo di Corte, S. Margherita, S. Siro, S. Maria Assunta, S. Lorenzo della Costa

Sestri Levante: S. Antonio, S. Bartolomeo della Ginestra, S. Bernardo, Basilica di Santa Maria di Nazareth, Sestri Levante, San Nicolò dell'isola di Sestri Levante, S. Stefano del Ponte, S. Giacomo, S. Paolo, S. Pietro, S. Vittoria, S. Sabina

Zoagli: S. Ambrogio, S. Martino, S. Pietro, S. Giovanni Battista

== Bibliography ==
- Remigius Ritzler; Pirminus Sefrin (1978). Hierarchia catholica Medii et recentioris aevi... A Pontificatu PII PP. IX (1846) usque ad Pontificatum Leonis PP. XIII (1903) (in Latin). Vol. VIII. Il Messaggero di S. Antonio.
- Pięta, Zenon (2002). Hierarchia catholica medii et recentioris aevi... A pontificatu Pii PP. X (1903) usque ad pontificatum Benedictii PP. XV (1922) (in Latin). Vol. IX. Padua: Messagero di San Antonio. ISBN 978-88-250-1000-8.
- Synodus Dioecesana Clavarensis Tertia in Cathedrali Basilica B.M.V. de Horto: ab illmo et Revmo D. Episcopo Amadaeo Casabona, habita diebus XVII-XIX Octobris MCMXXXIII (in Latin). Vatican City: Typis Polyglottis Vaticanis. 1933.
