= Santa Maria di Nazareth =

Santa Maria di Nazareth (translated into Saint Mary of Nazareth) is the name of at least two churches in Italy:

- Santa Maria di Nazareth (Venice)
- Basilica di Santa Maria di Nazareth, Sestri Levante
