= Basilica di Santa Maria di Nazareth, Sestri Levante =

Church in Sestri Levante, Italy

Coordinates: 44.2692°N 9.3919°E

Basilica di Santa Maria di Nazareth.

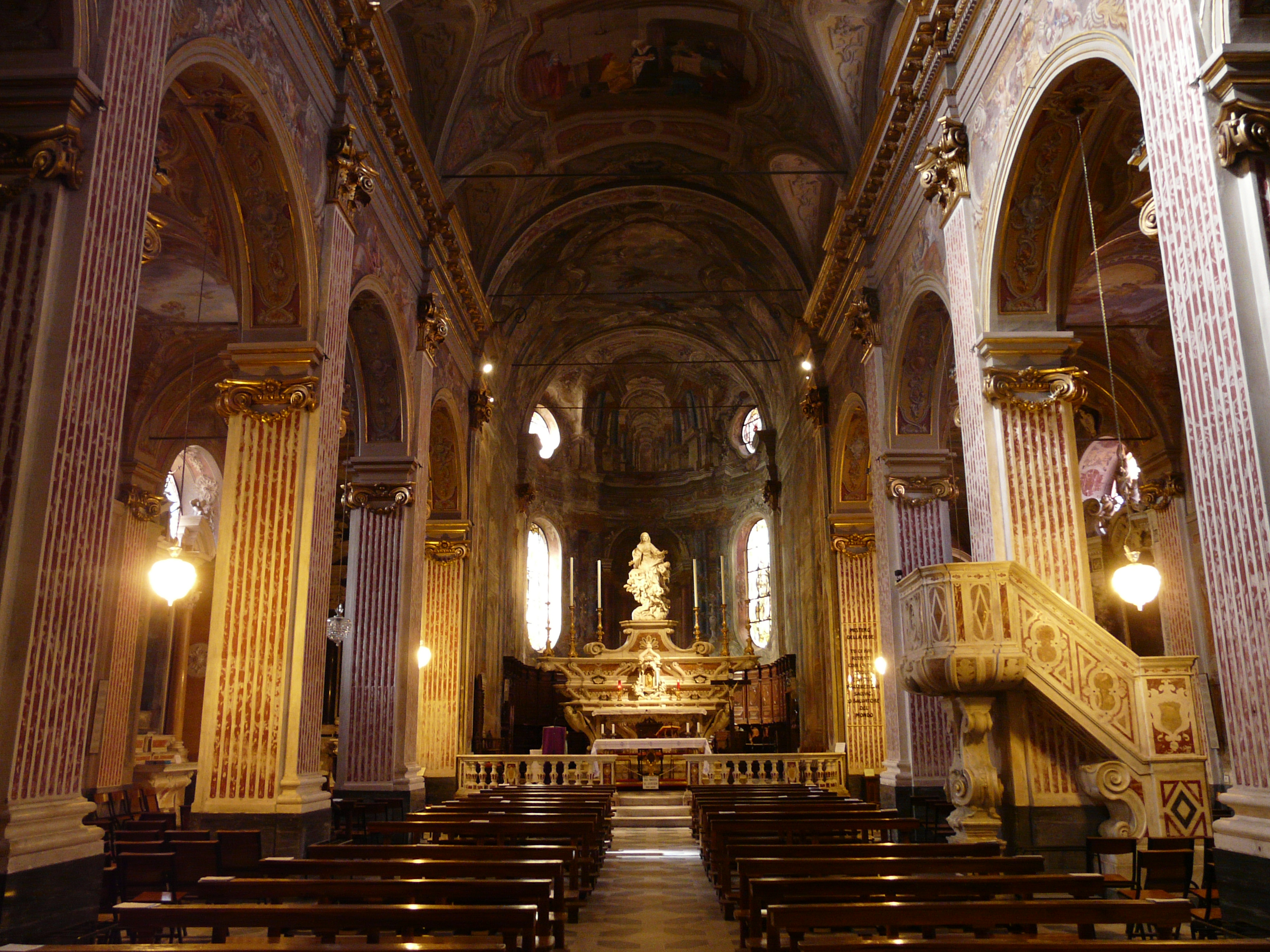
Interior view.

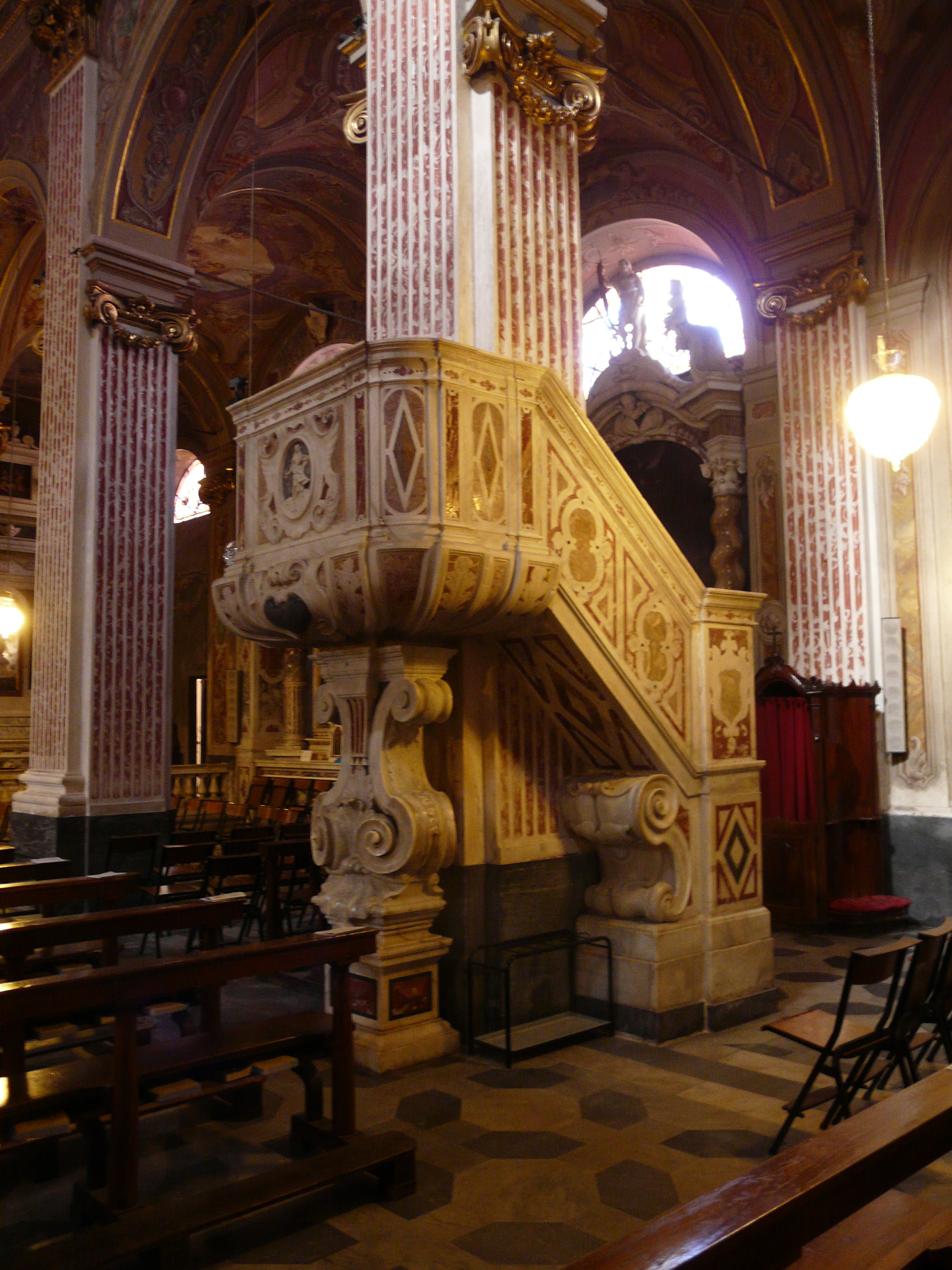
The pulpit.

Santa Maria di Nazareth is a Renaissance church in the town of Sestri Levante, in the Gulf of Tigullio in the Metropolitan City of Genoa. Located in the center of the old village of Sestri Levante, adjacent to the town hall, its parish community is part of the Diocese of Chiavari.

== History ==
A chapel at the site, dedicated to Mary, is documented as early as 1368, but by 1604, following the sale of a plot by the local nobleman Bernardo Bolasco, construction of the present church began. The final consolidation of the isthmus with the headland, known locally as "Island", which led to the expansion of Sestri Levante, and linked the community to the existing church of St. Nicholas, located at top of the island is already home parish, was therefore more suitable for the spiritual needs of the population.

The construction of the church over 12 years was entrusted to the architect Giovanni Battista Carbone. The church inherited the title of co-cathedral of the diocese of Brugnato from the existing church of St. Nicolò. It was the seat of synods, diocesan from 1675 to 1725 and home of the bishops of the diocese from the sixteenth to the 18th century. Elected to the title of Collegiate Church in 1755, it was named a minor basilica on June 22 of 1962. A few years later he switched to the Diocese of Chiavari (1959).

== Description ==
The interior has a three naves separated by square pillars with pilasters which rest on rounded arches. The interior was decorated in the 18th and 19th centuries. The nave has a barrel vault with lunettes, a deep chancel raised and a semicircular apse. The altar (1762) with polychrome marble contains a sculptural group by Francesco Maria Schiaffino depicting the Virgin Mary with cherubs holding up the Holy House of Nazareth.

The previous original facade of the 17th century, remain the two towers on either side that have decorations but also the 19th century, the portal is a marble statue of the Madonna and Child.

== Artworks ==
In the nave the largest frescoes (1893) are the work of the painter Lazzaro De Maestri, in the second altar of the right aisle of the painting The Martyrdom of Saint Catherine of Alexandria by Castellino Castello, in the presbytery and in the apse are works by Rocco Costa and Giuseppe Galeotti; in the chapel to the left of the nave there is a 12th=century crucifix from the former parish church of St. Nicolò.

In the left aisle where the wooden sculptural group representing the Deposition from the 18th century, a Pentecost by Domenico Fiasella, a Transit of St. Joseph (1654) by Orazio De Ferrari, a Madonna del Carmine and a Saints Lawrence and John the Baptist by Lazzaro Tavarone.

== Holidays and observances ==
The procession of the Holy Christ occurs every 25 years.

== See also ==
- Sestri Levante
- Diocese of Chiavari
- Basilica
