= San Giovanni Battista, Chiavari =

Roman Catholic church in Chiavari, Liguria, Italy

Coordinates: 44.31796°N 9.32480°E

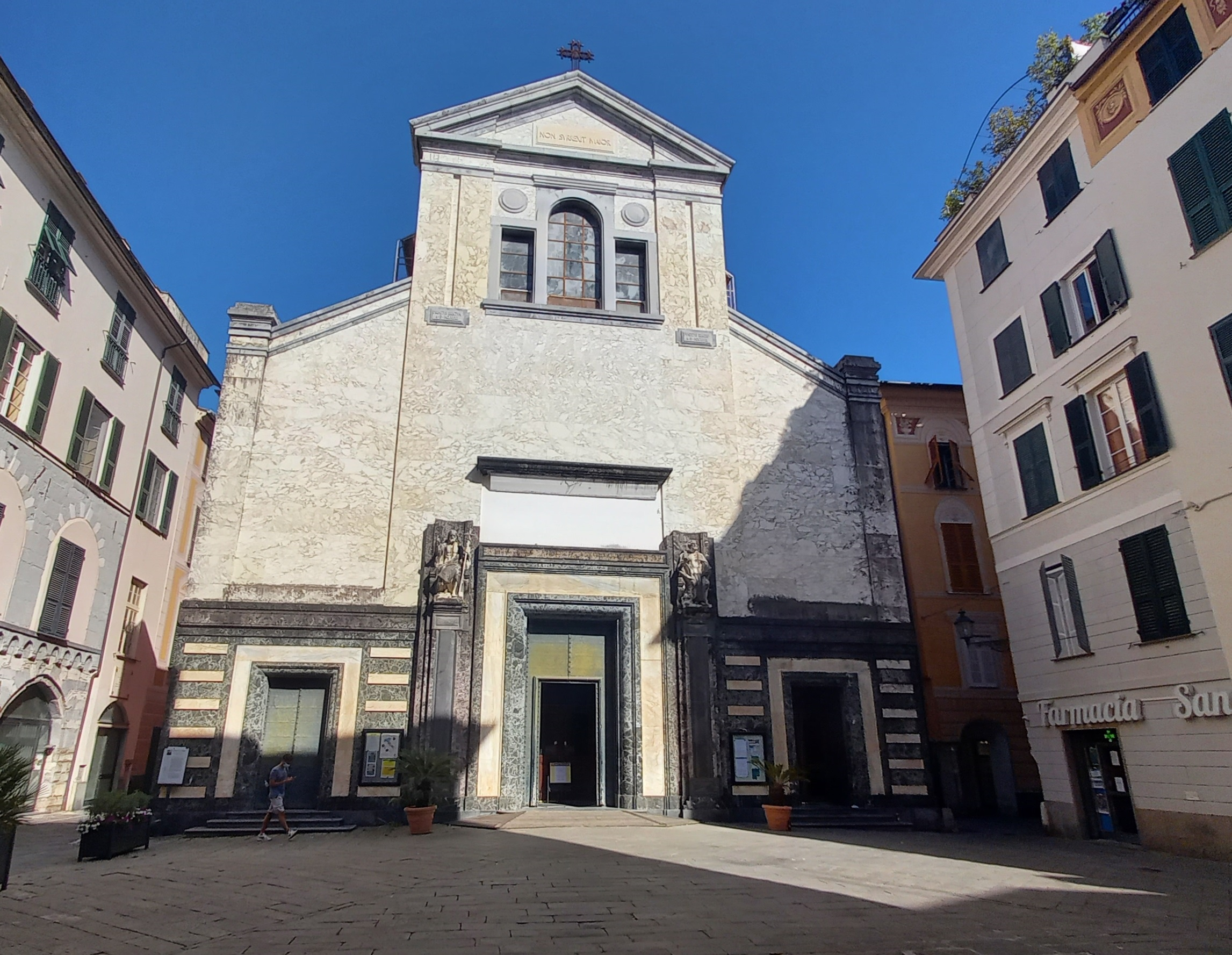
Facade of San Giovanni Battista

San Giovanni Batista is a Roman Catholic parish church located on Via Bighetti #61 in the town of Chiavari, in the Metropolitan City of Genoa, region of Liguria, Italy.

== History and decoration ==
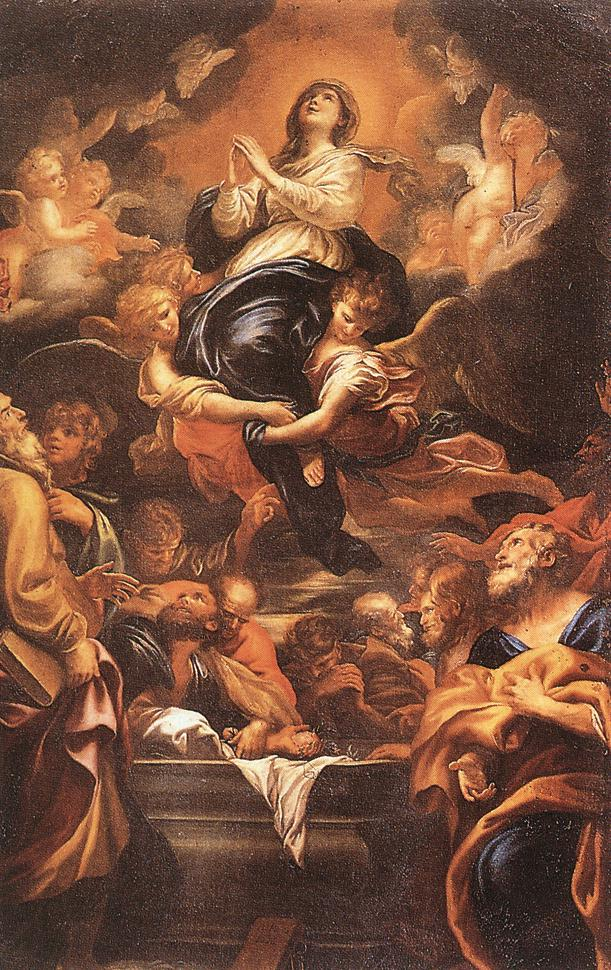
Assumption of the Virgin by Piola

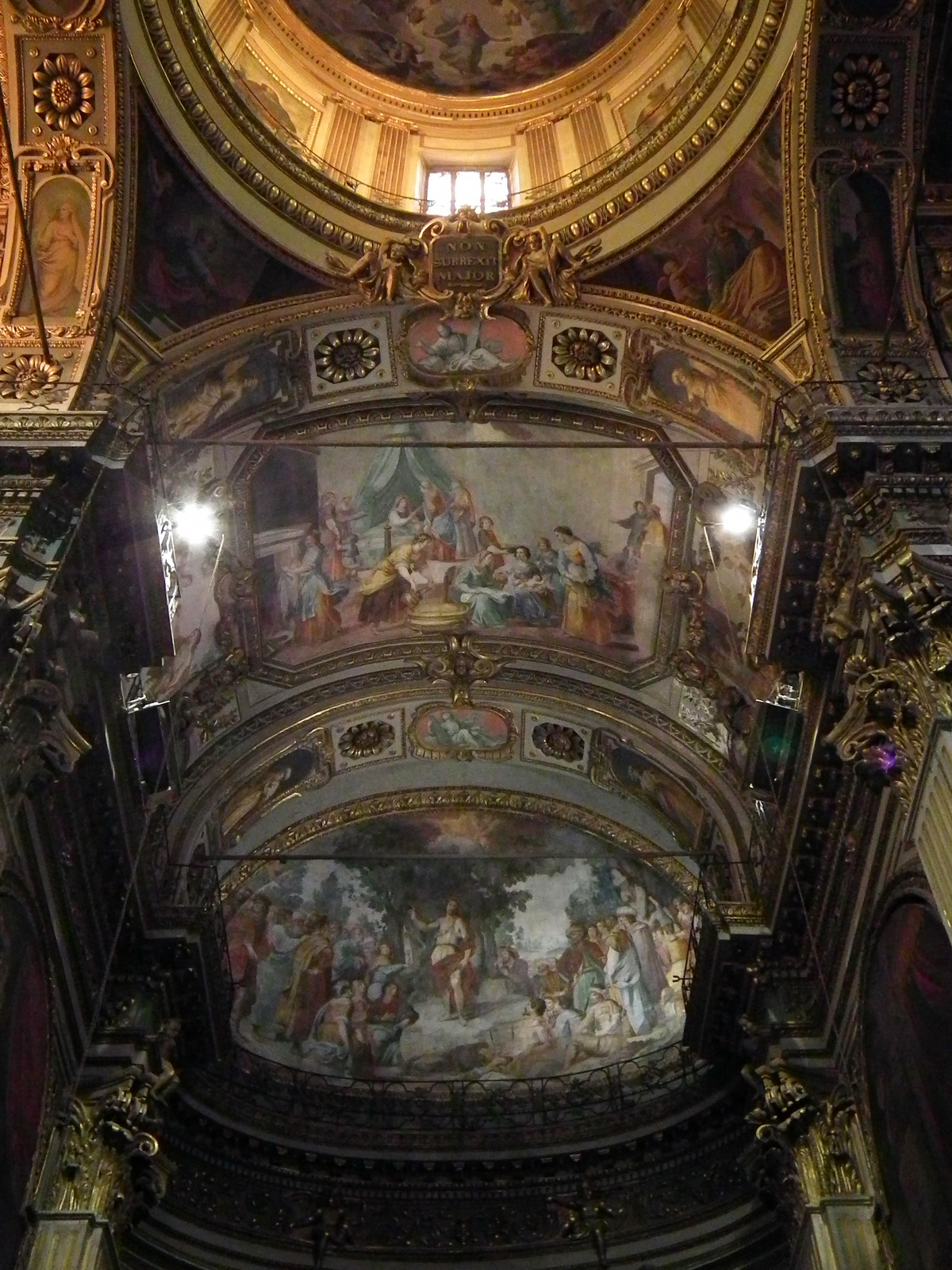
Ceiling frecoes depicting Birth of St John the Baptist and Sermon of St John the Baptist by GB Carloni

A church or chapel at the site dates from 1181 to 1182, when Bardone dei Conti Fieschi, a Benedictine Archpriest from the Lavagna, commissioned a chapel on land donated by his cousin, the count Ravaschieri. In 1311, the church of San Giovanni Battista was assigned the title of parish church, dependent on the church of Santo Stefano in Lavagna.

After a number of refurbishments, the layout of the church we see today was erected in 1624, using designs of the Genoese architects Andrea Ceresola (il Vannone) and Bartolomeo Rossi. The church was consecrated in 1631. In 1626, the main chapel was commissioned by the Costaguta family, using designs by Bartolomeo Bianco. The modern facade, completed in 1936 using white and black marbles, lacks the colors of the bell-tower and green tiled dome. The facade entrances have square portals, with the larger central portal flanked by two statues on niches supported by dark stone pilasters.

The severity of the facade also differs from the rich baroque interiors. Among the interior altarpieces and frescoes are:

- St Peter receives the Keys by Orazio De Ferrari
- Virgin of the Annunciation (first altar on right) and Death of St Joseph(third altar on right) by Domenico Fiasella
- Virgin of the Graces (right transept) by Bernardino Fazolo (or Fassolo)
- Virgin of Mercy by Barnaba da Modena
- The frescoes in the choir by Giovanni Battista Carloni depicting events in the life of John the Baptist, including his Birth, Sermon, Non licet, and a Dance of Salome
- Assumption of the Virgin by Domenico Piola.

A guide in 1899 mentions that in 1462, the church was enlarged to create the present three nave structure. In 1468, a clock was added to the tower. In 1557, the Ravaschieri family commissioned the bell-tower. The guide mentions two large canvases in the anti-facade depicting, on the right, the Invention of the Cross by Galeotti (possibly Sebastiano; and on the left, the Battle of Lepanto by either Piola or Domenico Fiasella (il Sarzana). In the main nave are three medallions painted with events of the life of St John the Baptist by Pianello. In the right nave ceiling are depictions of St Nicolò di Bari and St Peter by Davide Beghè, and St Joseph by Pianello and a crucifix by Coppola. In the left nave is a St Antonio del Barchi by Solari dello Schoner, the blessed Father Baldassare Ravaschieri by Chiarella, and a Rosary by Pianello. The organ was built in 1808 by the brothers Serassi of Bergamo. The church houses the venerated Cristo Nero, a statue of Christ, darkened in a fire, but putatively miraculously, not burned.
