= Coreglia Ligure =

Coreglia Ligure Coegia
- Comune
- Comune di Coreglia Ligure
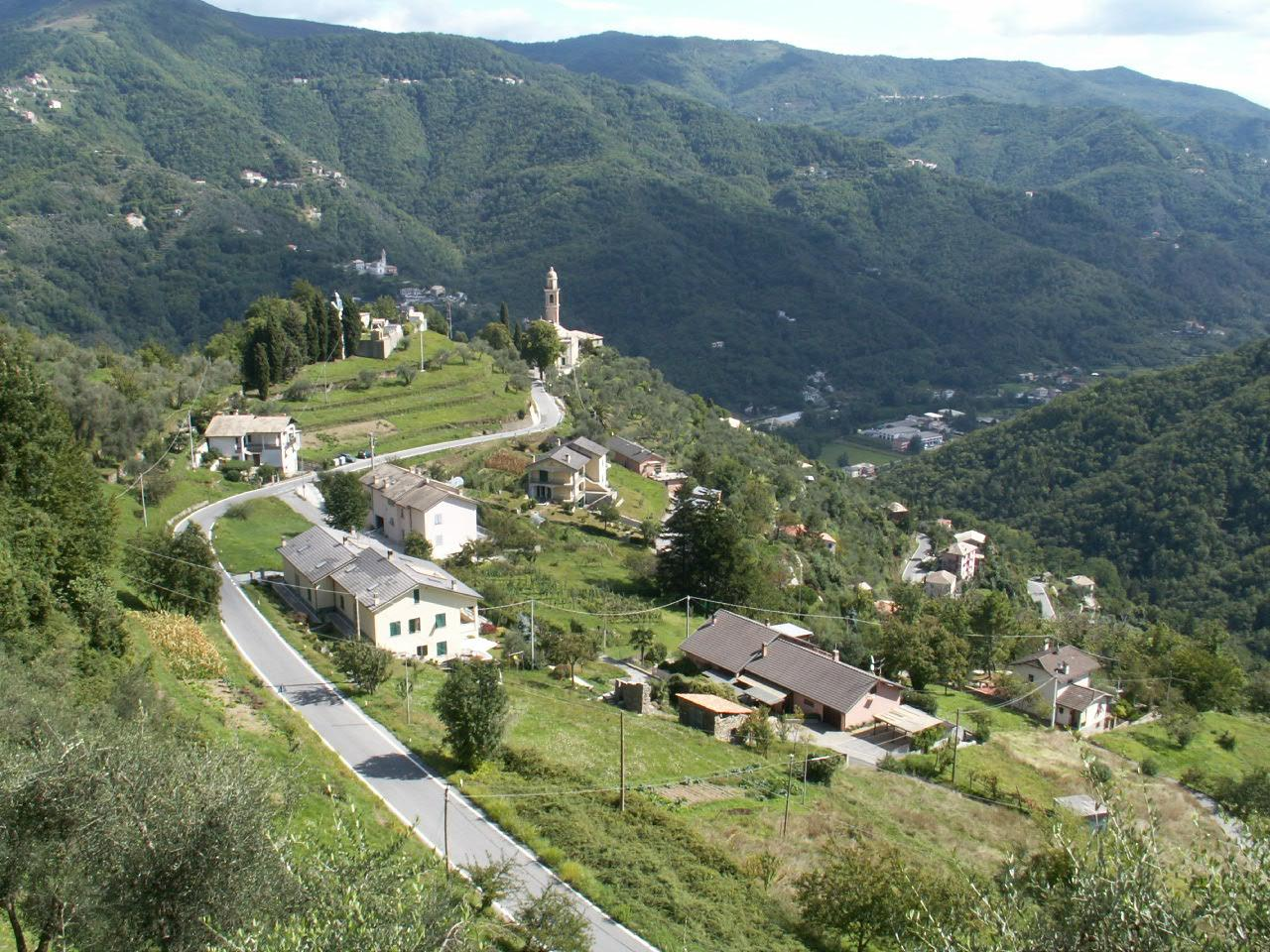
- Coreglia Ligure

- Location within Italy Location within Liguria
- Coordinates: 44°23′N 9°16′E
- Country: Italy
- Region: Liguria
- Metropolitan city: Genoa (GE)
- Frazioni: Canevale, Dezerega

Government
  - Mayor: Ermano Noce

Area
  - Total: 8.0 km^{2} (3.1 sq mi)
- Elevation: 65 m (213 ft)

Population (31 May 2022)Metropolitan City
  - Total: 263
  - Density: 33/km^{2} (85/sq mi)
- Demonym: Coregliesi
- Time zone: UTC+1 (CET)
  - Summer (DST): UTC+2 (CEST)
- Postal code: 16040
- Dialing code: 0185

Coreglia Ligure (Ligurian: Coegia) is a comune (municipality) in the Metropolitan City of Genoa in the Italian region Liguria, located about 25 kilometres (16 mi) east of Genoa.

Coreglia Ligure borders the following municipalities: Cicagna, Orero, Rapallo, San Colombano Certénoli, Zoagli.

== Twin towns ==
Coreglia Ligure is twinned with:

- Coreglia Antelminelli, Italy, since 2005
