= Cicagna =

- Comune
- Comune di Cicagna
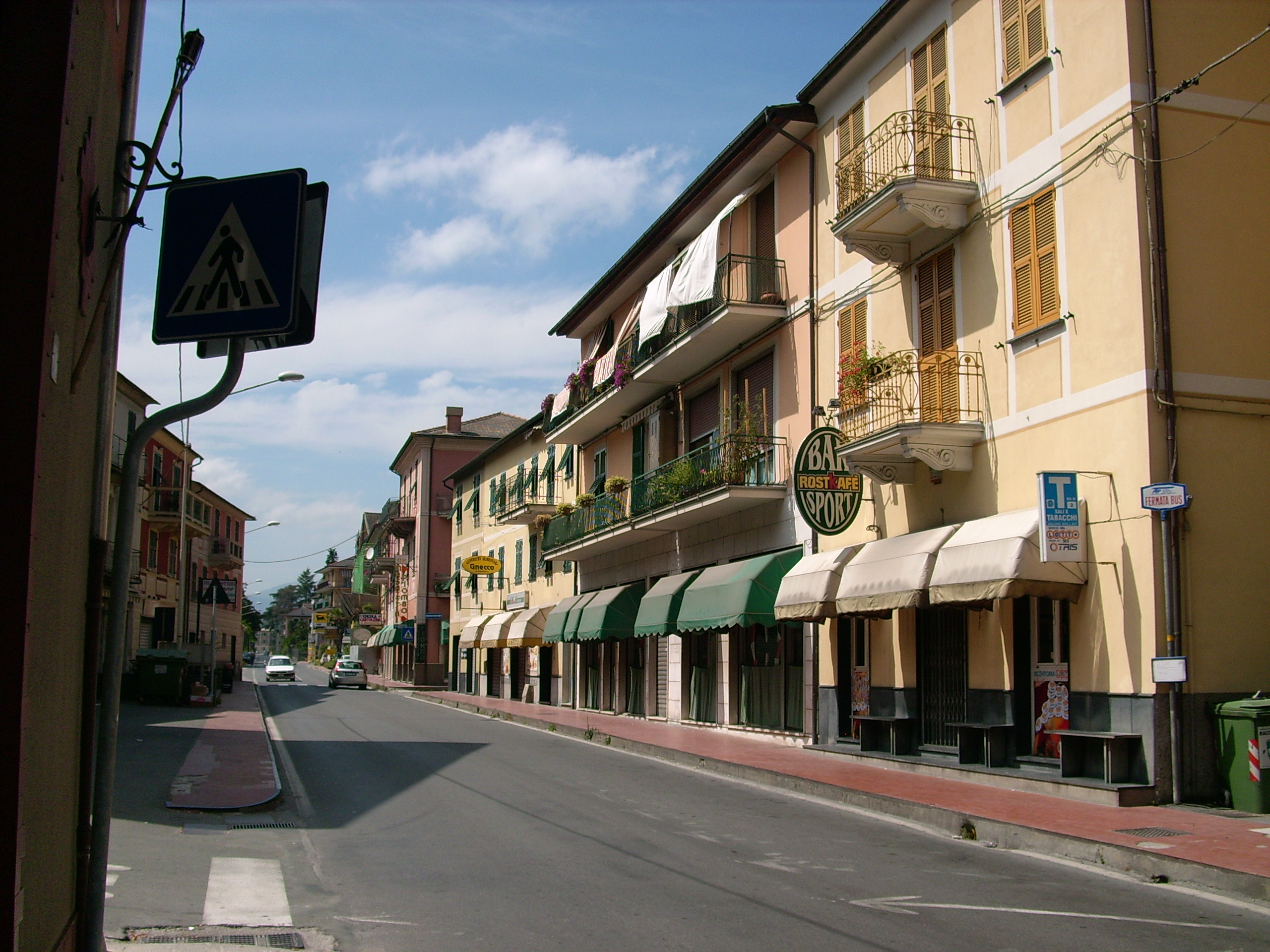

- Coat of arms

- Location within Italy Location within Liguria
- Coordinates: 44°25′N 9°14′E
- Country: Italy
- Region: Liguria
- Metropolitan city: Genoa (GE)
- Frazioni: Monleone, Pianezza, Serra

Government
  - Mayor: Marco Limoncini

Area
  - Total: 11.28 km^{2} (4.36 sq mi)
- Elevation: 88 m (289 ft)

Population (30 June 2017)
  - Total: 2,477
  - Density: 219.6/km^{2} (568.7/sq mi)
- Demonym: Cicagnesi
- Time zone: UTC+1 (CET)
  - Summer (DST): UTC+2 (CEST)
- Postal code: 16044
- Dialing code: 0185
- Website: Official website

Cicagna is a comune (municipality) in the Metropolitan City of Genoa in the Italian region Liguria, located about 25 kilometres (16 mi) east of Genoa.

Cicagna borders the following municipalities: Coreglia Ligure, Lorsica, Mocònesi, Orero, Rapallo, Tribogna.
