= Monte Bue =

Mountain of the Ligurian Apennines

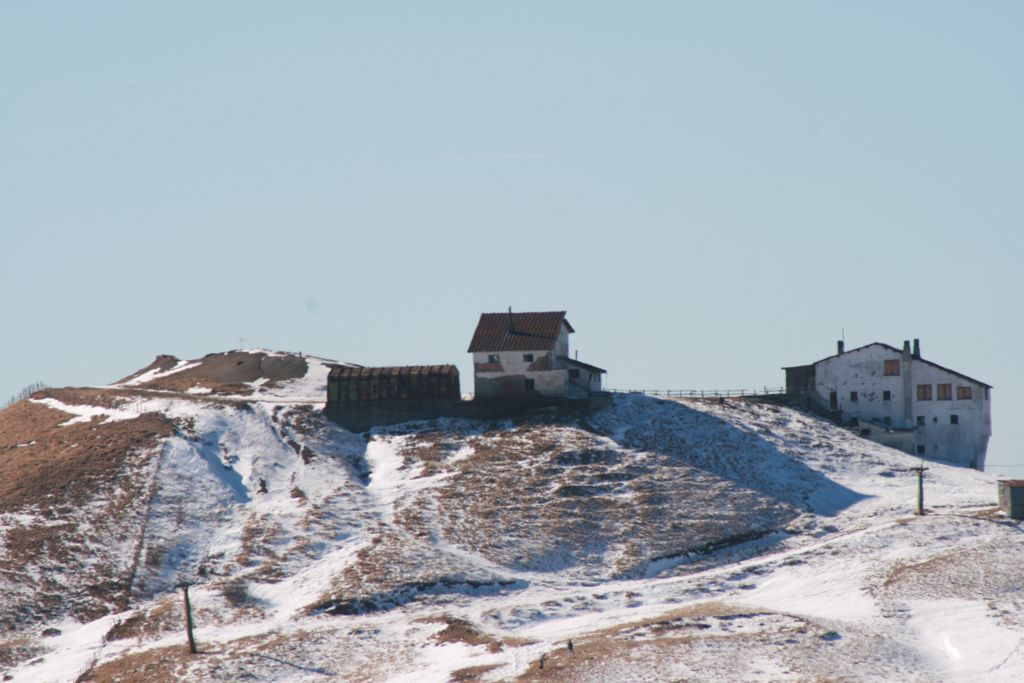
- The summit

Highest point
- Elevation: 1,774 m (5,820 ft)
- Prominence: 66 m (217 ft)
- Isolation: 0.6 km (0.37 mi)
- Coordinates: 44°33′21″N 9°29′34″E

Geography
- Location within Italy
- Country: Italy
- Province: Genoa, Parma and Piacenza
- Regions: Liguria and Emilia-Romagna
- Parent range: Ligurian Apennines

Mount Bue is a mountain in the Ligurian Apennines that is part of the Maggiorasca mountain group, located on the watershed between the Aveto, Ceno and Nure valleys, on the border between the metropolitan city of Genoa and the provinces of Parma and Piacenza, between the municipalities of Santo Stefano d'Aveto, Bedonia and Ferriere. It is the second highest peak in the Ligurian Apennines, after nearby Mount Maggiorasca and the highest peak in the province of Piacenza.

The Ligurian side falls within the territory of the Aveto Natural Regional Park, while the Emilian side falls within the SCI Monte Nero, Monte Maggiorasca, La Ciapa Liscia.

== History ==
In the 1960s, a cable car capable of connecting Rocca d'Aveto, a hamlet of Santo Stefano d'Aveto, with the summit of the mountain was built on the Aveto side of the mountain, with an intermediate station at Prato della Cipolla. The lift was inaugurated in the winter of 1965, in the presence of Interior Minister Paolo Emilio Taviani. With the construction of the ski lifts, a mountain hut was also built on the summit for the reception and overnight stay of tourists. On the Parma side of the mountain, on the other hand, a ski lift was built to access the summit from Prato Grande dell'Anzola.

The lift remained in operation until 1993 when, after a series of snowless winters starting in 1988, the Val d'Aveto Spa company, operator of the lifts, went bankrupt causing its closure, which also affected the refuge.

In the summer of 2008, the Austrian company Doppelmayr began work on the construction of a two-seater chairlift from Rocca d'Aveto to Prato Cipolla. Once the work was completed, the chairlift was inaugurated the following December 26. The same company was later responsible for the construction of the second section of the chairlift, from Prato della Cipolla to the top of the mountain, which was inaugurated on October 9, 2010. Following the reactivation of the lifts up to the summit, the hut located at the top of the mountain was also reopened in 2011.

== Description ==
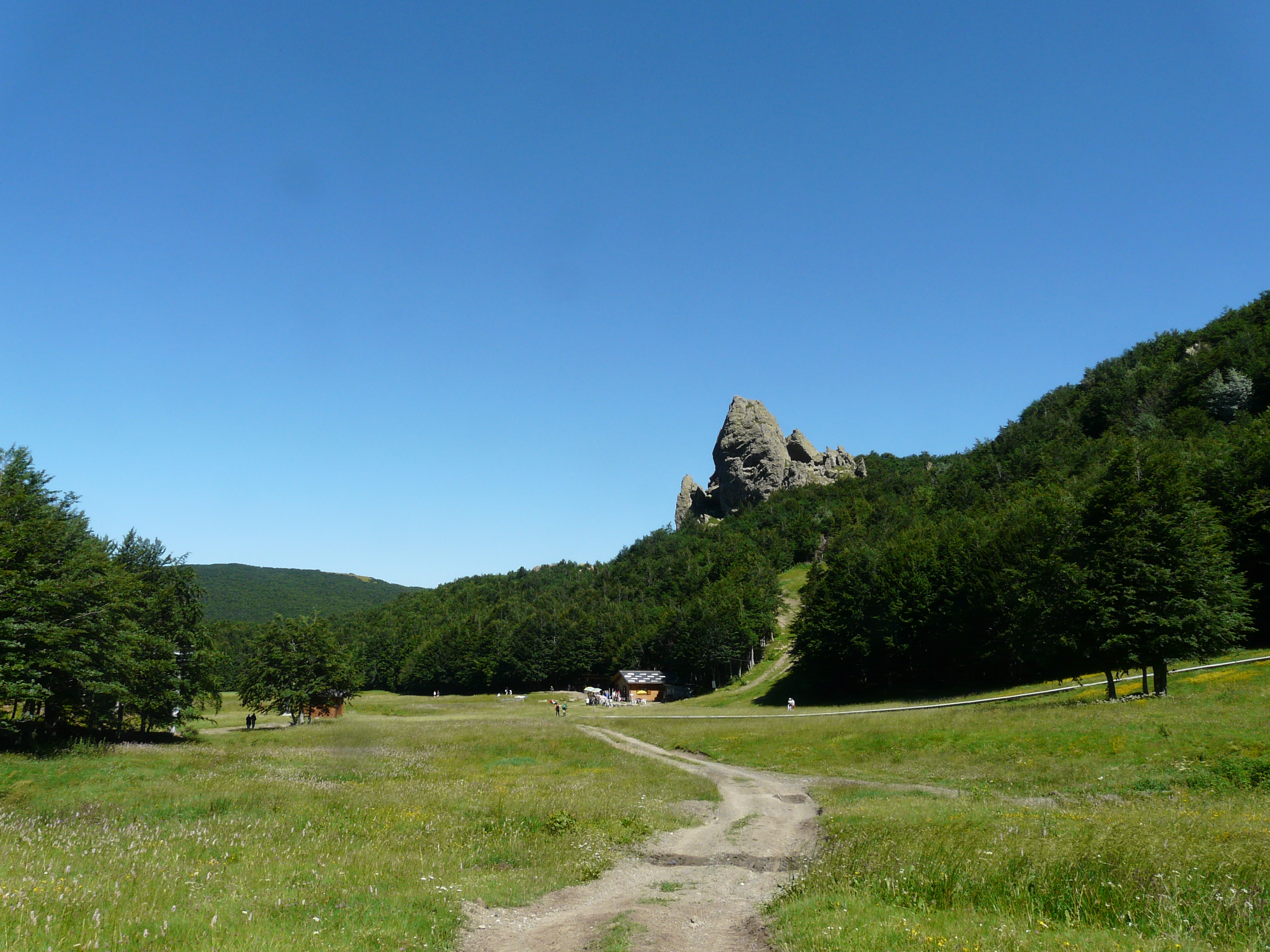
Prato della Cipolla (Onion Meadow)

Mount Bue, located north of Mount Maggiorasca, from which it is separated by the Colletta Pass, is characterized by a vaguely pyramidal shape and a grassy summit. It is composed of resurfaced ophiolitic sandstones that are the origin of the mountain's smoother shapes compared to the neighboring mountain peaks generated by outcrops of basalts and peridotites.

The summit of Mount Bue is the point where the ridge dividing the Aveto valley from the Ceno valley splits, giving rise to the Nure valley.

On the slopes of the mountain, in the municipality of Ferriere, there is the Sacchi bivouac and the short Mazzocchi ferrata, while in the municipality of Santo Stefano d'Aveto there is a refuge at Prato della Cipolla.

== Tourism ==
On the Aveto side there is a ski resort, called Santo Stefano Ski Area with a ski lift, two chairlifts and a treadmill in service of the school camp where people can learn to ski. The area also includes a ring for cross-country skiing.

In summer, the area is popular for hiking and rock climbing, with the crags of Rocca del Prete, Mt. Maggiorasca, Waiting for Fred, and Dente delle Ali; these crags are characterized by the presence of often quite crumbly ophiolite.

== See also ==
- Monte Maggiorasca

== Bibliography ==
Cartography

- Carta escursionistica Appennino Piacentino 2 - Val Trebbia e Val Nure, Infocartografica SCN e CAI Piacenza, scala 1:25.000, edizione 2021
