= Monte Pelpi (Emilia Romagna) =

Mountain in Italy

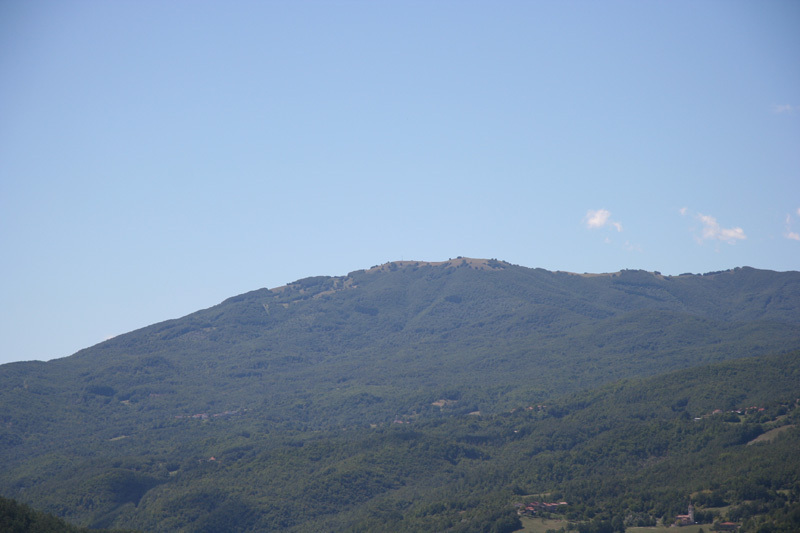

Highest point
- Elevation: 1,495 m (4,905 ft)
- Prominence: 677 m (2,221 ft)
- Isolation: 8.58 km (5.33 mi)
- Coordinates: 44°32′45″N 9°39′05″E

Geography
- Location within Italy
- Location: Emilia-Romagna, Italy
- Parent range: Tuscan-Emilian Apennines

Monte Pelpi is a mountain 1,495 metres (4,905 ft) high located in the Tuscan-Emilian Apennines in northern Italy. The mountain overlooks the towns of Bedonia to the south and Bardi to the north, and rises like a cone between the Taro, Toncina and Ceno valleys. The vegetation is very diverse with forests consisting of beech, oak, hazel, hornbeam and black aspen and includes rare species of arnicas, orchid, daffodils, gentian, daphne and anemones. The forest gives way to a 1 kilometre (0.62 mi) stretch of grassland at the summit on which stands a large steel cross. It is said that the mountain protects the towns of Bedonia and Compiano from the cold northern winds during winter. The view from this peak exceeds that of the taller Monte Penna nearby and it offers an extraordinary panorama of both valleys and the other peaks of the Liguran-Emilian Apennines, ranging from Monte Penna, Monte Tomarlo, Monte Maggiorasca, Monte Ragola. On clear days it is possible to observe the Mediterranean Sea.

Sambuceto and Strela are two small villages that are located along one of the roads that wind across the mountain. The area is notorious for massacres committed by the Nazis during World War II in retaliation for the intense partisan activity. Around Monte Pelpi are the villages of: Ca' Scapini, Farfanaro, Caprile, Costa Agucchia, Pian dell'Asse, Costa di Cereseto, Trario, Pareto di Credarola, Credarola, Granelli, Lago Lobbia, Pilati, Monti, Castagna, Ceio, Libbia, Masanti di Sotto, Masanti di Sopra, Cavignaga, Capella Carpana, Sambuceto, Belli (Hydro Electric Power station.)

Pelpi is known for its crystal clear spring water which has an alkaline-sulfurous quality and is renowned for its healing properties. There are many streams that run through the slopes of the mountain, and the mineral water which flows from the north-western slope is bottled in plants at Masanti. The beneficial qualities of these waters were quoted by the early 19th century travel writer Captain Antonio Boccia as "commended for curing many ills of those who bathe in its waters." The Milanese poet Francesco Piccinelli also wrote in his description of the Taro and Ceno Valleys (1617) "drinking the water, heals all conditions of the throat." During 2009 there was a dispute between a committee of locals and the mineral water company Lynx/Norda, who were concerned that the company would drain the aquifers within the mountain causing the supply to run dry for the personal consumption of the Masanti residents. Every year in mid-August there is an organised hike up Monte Pelpi, as part of the "festa di San Gioacchino" (festival dedicated to Saint Joachim,) held in the nearby rural village of Cavignaga.

== The cross ==
There is a large steel cross standing 22 metres (72 ft) high, built on 16 October 1955 at the summit. This steel cross replaces a wooden cross in the same location which was built earlier in the 20th century. The cross was the initiative of Bishop Renato Costa, and the former alumni of the seminary of Bedonia. Costa instigated the search to find appropriate funding and resources for the project. In 1953, his unerring 'instinct' led him to the famous Falck steelworks at Sesto San Giovanni (Milan.) The lattice structure was donated by the Falck family in memory of the company's founder Enrico Falck, who died some time before. Today it is still one of the tallest crosses placed on any mountain, 22 meters tall and 4 metric tons (4.4 short tons) in weight. In celebration of its fiftieth anniversary, a plaque has been replaced which was an identical copy of the lost original 1955 plaque, that commemorated the construction and benefactors. The inscription, translated from the original Italian, reads:

SYMBOL OF HUMAN REDEMPTION. A PLEDGE OF PROTECTION AND SALVATION VOTED FOR BY THE FORMER ALUMNI OF THE SEMINARY. AND IN MEMORY OF SEN. ENRICO FALCK

THE GREAT ARMS OF PELPI'S NEW MONUMENTAL CROSS EXTEND TO UNITE ALL MEN IN CHRIST.

BEDONIA 15. VII 1956
