= Ponte sul Taro =

Bridge in Italy on the Ancient Roman via Emilia

Coordinates: 44.82266°N 10.21672°E

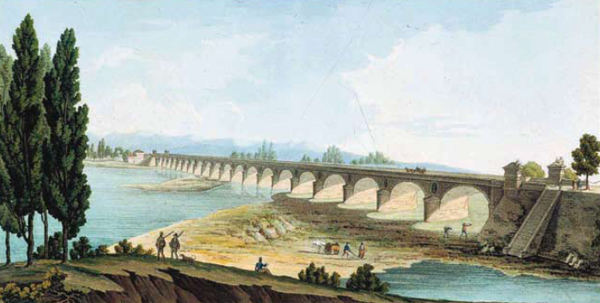
Anonimo, Il ponte sul Taro, early 19th-century, Parma, Museo Glauco Lombardi

The Ponte sul Taro or Bridge over the Taro River is a bridge along the Ancient Roman via Emilia, whose present structure still incorporates the construction from 1816 to 1821, and is located just northwest of Parma, in the neighborhood of Ponte Taro of the municipality of Noceto, Region of Emilia-Romagna, Italy.

== History ==
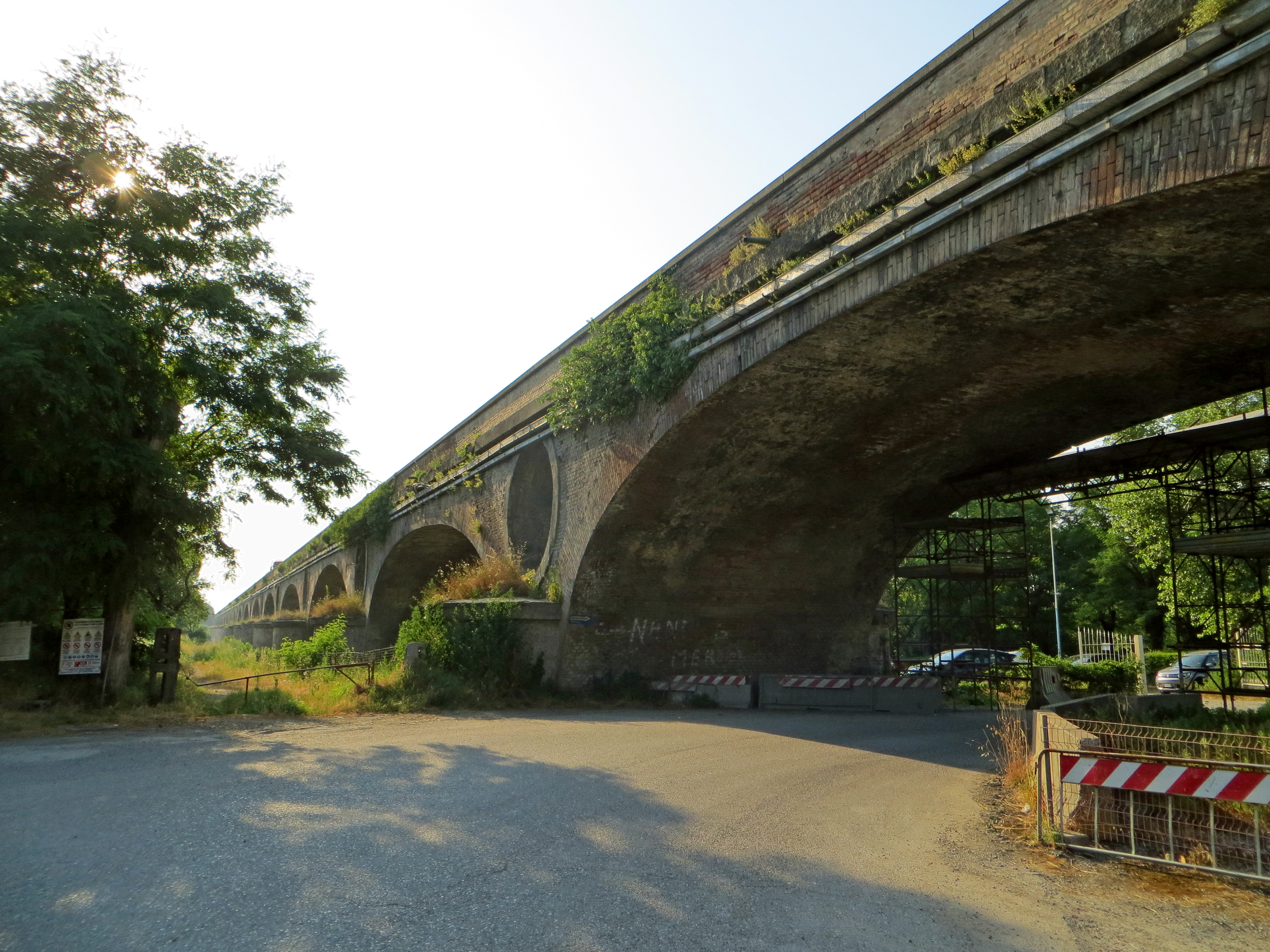
View of bridge from right riverbank.

Bridges at this site had been erected by the Romans as part of the Via Emilia, but over time collapsed. In 1170, a hermit by the name of Nonantola rebuilt a crude bridge across the site. He was granted privileges by the bishop Bernardo II to establish a monastery and hostal/hospital at the site, ministering to pilgrims traveling along the route.

In 1235, a flood destroyed the bridge and monastic structures, leading a reconstruction by 1294. In 1325, the institution was granted to the Abbey of Fontevivo. Further floods continued to destroy attempts to bridge the river, leaving passage at the site at the mercy of boats. In 1816, Marie Louise, Duchess of Parma commissioned a permanent bridge. The structure was designed by Antonio Cocconcelli and his aide Giambattista Ferrari, with construction managed by Amedeo Rosazza. Inaugurated in 1821, in its day, the 600 meter bridge spanning 20 arches was considered a master feat of engineering. It cost just over 2 million Lire at the time. At each end of the span, sculpted by Giuseppe Carra, were and still are two flanking reclining statues, each representing the main rivers traversing the Duchy: Parma, Taro, Enza, and Stirone.
