= Santo Stefano d'Aveto =

- Comune
- Comune di Santo Stefano d'Aveto
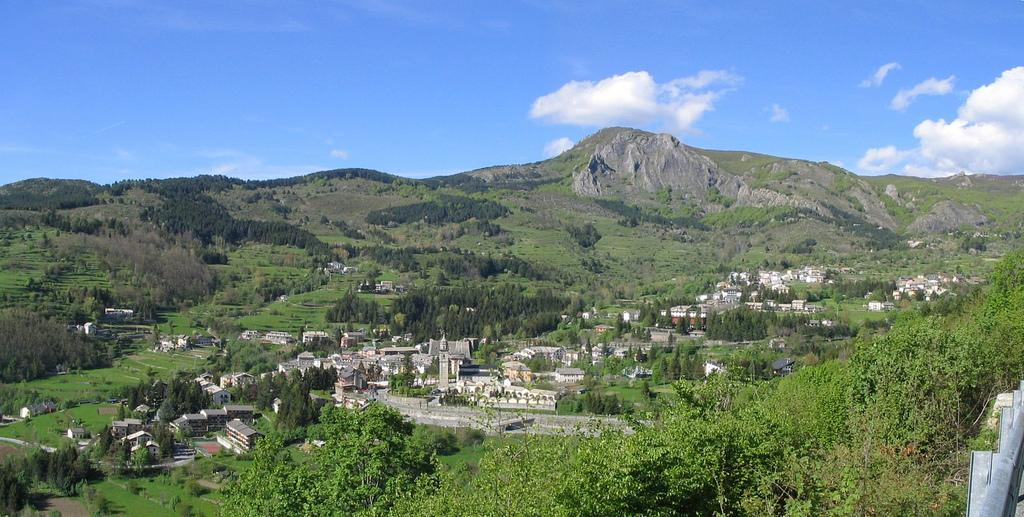
- Santo Stefano d'Aveto

- Coat of arms

- Location within Italy Location within Liguria
- Coordinates: 44°32′N 9°27′E
- Country: Italy
- Region: Liguria
- Metropolitan city: Genoa (GE)
- Frazioni: Ascona, Pian D'Aveto, Pievetta, Pareto, Torrini, Allegrezze, Caselle, Cornaleto, Costapelata, Gramizza, La Villa, Amborzasco, Casoni D'Amborzasco, Montegrosso, Monte Penna, Alpicella, Casafredda, Gavadi, Pian Pendini, Villaneri

Government
  - Mayor: Maria Antonietta Cella

Area
  - Total: 55.4 km^{2} (21.4 sq mi)
- Elevation: 1,012 m (3,320 ft)

Population (Dec. 2004)
  - Total: 1,255
  - Density: 22.7/km^{2} (58.7/sq mi)
- Demonym: Santostefanesi
- Time zone: UTC+1 (CET)
  - Summer (DST): UTC+2 (CEST)
- Postal code: 16049
- Dialing code: 0185
- Patron saint: Madonna of Guadalupe
- Saint day: First Sunday after August 15
- Website: Official website

Santo Stefano d'Aveto (Ligurian: San Stê) is a comune (municipality) in the Metropolitan City of Genoa in the Italian region Liguria.

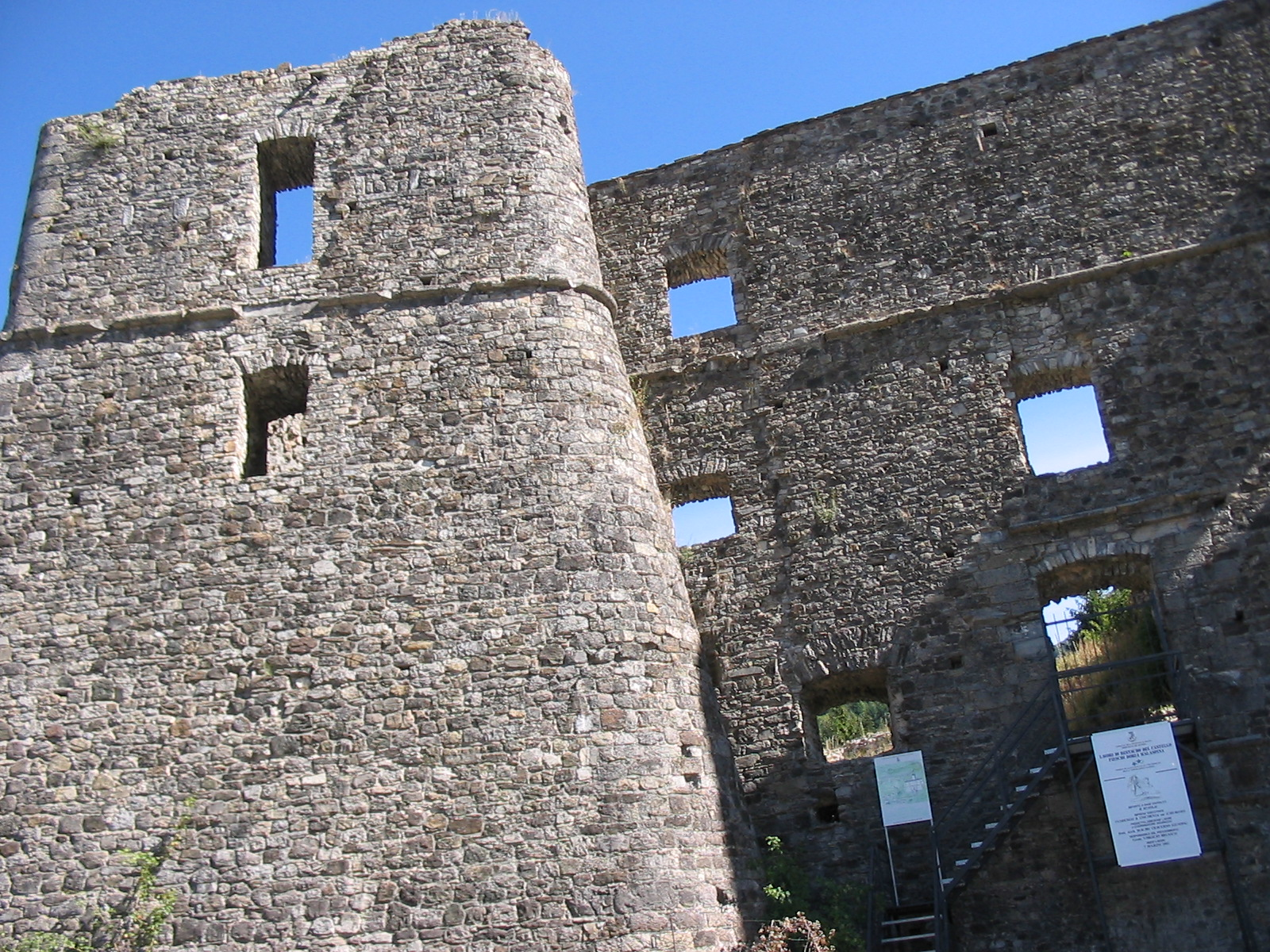
View of the castle of Santo Stefano d'Aveto

Santo Stefano d'Aveto borders the comuni of Bedonia, Borzonasca, Ferriere, Rezzoaglio and Tornolo.

== Geography ==
Santo Stefano d'Aveto is about 75 kilometres (47 mi) northeast of Genoa, in the Val d'Aveto, near the Aveto river. The town is part of the Comunità montana Valli Aveto, Graveglia e Sturla, and is one of five Ligurian towns in the Aveto Natural Regional Park.

== History ==
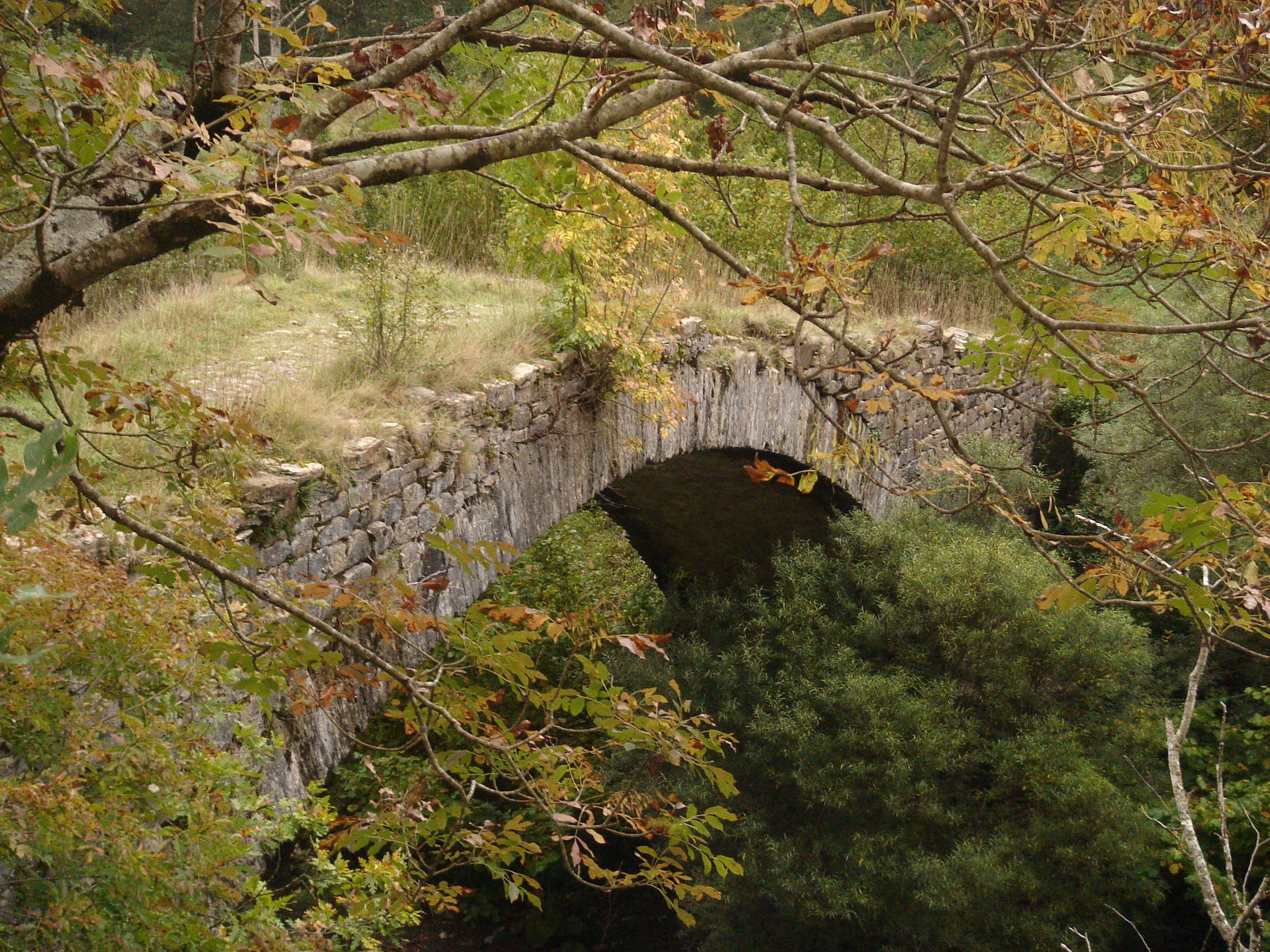
Roman bridge over the Granizza stream

The town was likely founded during prehistoric times, and the first mention of this town was during the 2nd century BC, where at the foot of Monte Penna a battle between the Romans and Ligurians took place. In the 12th century AD, Emperor Frederick Barbarossa conferred the fief of Santo Stefano d'Aveto upon the Malaspina family, who then constructed the ponderous castle. The fief were then passed on to the Fieschi family and later to the Doria family, all related by an elaborate intermarriage network of noble families.

== Main sights ==
- Malaspina Castle (13th century), currently in ruin, but undergoing limited restoration. The castle is located off the central piazza of the town, and features a highly irregular polygonal base.
- The sanctuary of the Our Lady of Guadalupe is the town church, on the grounds of which is found the town cemetery. Among the relics it holds is a bronze medallion of Christopher Columbus mounted on the main door. The present church was founded in 1929.

=== Mountains ===
- Monte Maggiorasca (1,799 m)
- Monte Bue (1,777 m)
- Monte Penna (1,735)
- Monte Tomarlo (1,602 m)
- Groppo Rosso (1,594 m)

== Cultural events ==
- First Sunday after Ferragosto (15 August): Patron Saint feast "Madonna di Guadalupe"
- 2 September: Fair of St. Mary Magdalene
- 5 October: Fair of St. Francis

== Economy ==
=== Tourism ===
The town was given the honor of "Orange Flag" in 2006 by the Italian Touring Club, a symbol of superior quality for tourism, and awarded only to smaller inland communities to distinguish these towns for excellence and hospitality. The town is best known as a launch site for trekking or hiking, horse riding, and skiing.

The local mountains are a favorite destination for recreational skiing.

== Food ==
=== San Stè cheese ===
"San Stè" is a traditional cheese made in this town. This cheese is a far cry from the mass-produced confections found in the grocery store. It is produced by a small collection of families, and made in the identical fashion for centuries. The cheese itself is produced from unpasteurized bovine whole milk principally from the Bruno-alpina or Cabannina cattle races, coagulated with veal rennet, either in paste or powder form, at about 35 °C (95 °F), mixing for 35 minutes, breaking apart large curds until the mixture is curdled to the size of rice. Salt is also added to the curd.

The mixture is then placed in a round form measuring 10 centimetres (3.9 in) high and 13 to 15 centimetres (5.1 to 5.9 in) in diameter. The cheese in this form weighs about 8 to 12 kilograms (18 to 26 lb). The crust is thin, elastic, compact, and edible. Inside, the cheese has a yellowish color like wheat. After aging for about two months, the cheese is ready for the table, and provides a delicate flavor, slightly bitter, becoming more intense with greater aging.

=== Mushrooms ===
Mushrooms, gathered in the wild, are a very popular delicacy of the town. There exists a long-standing tradition among the men in the town to hunt and gather mushrooms, but to never reveal the source. This tradition, however, has received the attention of the government, and the gathering of mushrooms is now strictly regulated.

== Transport ==
Santo Stefano d'Aveto is served by Strada Provinciale 654 della Val di Nure (SP-654), which connects it to Rezzoaglio. The town is not directly reachable by autostrada, or major highway.

Another prominent use of the local, winding roads is the Val d'Aveto Rally, featuring automobile races annually since 1975.

The nearest train station to the North is located in Piacenza; the nearest train station to the south is located in Chiavari. Public buses provide transport from the latter to Santo Stefano d'Aveto.

== Notable people ==
- Luigi Fugazy (1839–1930), banker and philanthropist
