= Val d'Aveto =

Coordinates: 44.5333°N 9.3833°E

The Val d'Aveto, or Aveto valley, straddles the Province of Genoa and the Province of Piacenza, between the Italian regions of Liguria and Emilia-Romagna. The river Aveto runs through the valley, to later join its waters with those of the Trebbia near the hamlet of Confiente. The upper, Ligurian part of the valley comprises the Comuni of Rezzoaglio and Santo Stefano d'Aveto; the lower, Emilian part of the valley is divided between Ferriere, Cerignale and Corte Brugnatella. Verdant and lush, characterized by pleasant sights, fresh and balmy summers and abundant snow in winter, the valley is flanked by forested mountains, culminating at the elevation of 1799 meters with Monte Maggiorasca.

== History ==
In Roman times, the local inhabitants, the Iluates and Veleiates Ligures, gave more than a headache to the Latin powerhouse: Titus Livy and consul Gneus Fabricius had words of appraisal for their fighting qualities. The Veleiates were eventually subjugated after suffering defeat near Monte Penna at the hands of consul Marcus Claudius Marcellus in 166 a.C. The heathen Ligurians venerated that very mountain as a deity, and the forests at its foothills were deemed to be sacred ground.

During the High Middle Ages, the valley welcomed a community of friars, who went on to build an important monastery located at Villa Cella and quoted in written documents of the Lombard epoch. Up to the Middle Ages, a lake occupied the plain now known as la Moglia near the hamlet of Cabanne. It was the monks of Villa Cella that, working hard, opened the natural dam that kept the water into the lake and made it run down the valley through the Masappello gorge.

In later times, the valley was part of the Malaspina domain: these lords started building the Castle of Santo Stefano d'Aveto. At the end of the 15th century, the Fieschi family acquired the area for the sum of 28,000 livres.

After the failure of the Fieschi Plot in Genoa (1547), the Val d'Aveto was assigned to the powerful Doria family. Two major revolts were directed against their domination in the last years of the 18th century, when the territory ended up an integral part of the Republic of Genoa, then of the Kingdom of Sardinia, and eventually of the Kingdom of Italy.

During the Second World War, given its difficult terrain, the valley became a fastness of the Italian Resistenza, being mostly spared by the fighting, which took place in nearby areas as Val Fontanabuona and the Sturla and Graveglia valleys.

Today, part of the Val d'Aveto is covered by the Aveto Natural Regional Park (Parco Regionale dell'Aveto). The natural reserve of the Agoraie e Moggetto protects the Lago degli Abeti (Fir Lake), on whose bottom fossil fir logs can be seen.

=== Historical trivia ===
The Val d'Aveto was the den of brigands; many legends find their origins here.

It is said that there was once an inn near the meadow known as Cabruscià. The innkeeper was murmured to be used to poison its richest guests; when exposed by the Malaspina lords, he was burnt alive in his inn, whence the name of the place, Ca bruxià (Ligurian for Casa bruciata, "burnt house"). Other sources say this name belongs instead to an old customs house along the road to Borzonasca.

The Val d'Aveto had an important guest in the Nobel Prize winner, the writer Ernest Hemingway. During the Second World War, in 1945, he passed through the valley while embedded as war correspondent in the Allied liberation forces. It is said that on his diary he wrote: "Today I visited the most beautiful valley in this world". Be it true or not, Hemingway again visited the area in the 1950s for fishing.

== Culture ==
The Val d'Aveto is part of the culturally homogeneous territory known as the Four Provinces (Italian: Quattro Province), straddling the contiguous mountain areas of the Provinces of Alessandria, Genoa, Pavia, Piacenza) and featuring a common tradition and an important repertoire of very ancient music and dances. The main instrument played here is the Apennine pennywhistle, that together with the accordion, and once upon a time by the müsa (Apennine pipes), sets the tune and rhythm for the dances and enlivens the feasts.

== Flora and fauna ==
Liguria is home to the most diverse collection of plant life throughout the whole of Italy. The Val d'Aveto, part of the Ligurian section of the Apennines, is located in a particularly favorable environment for a number of climatical, geographic e geological reasons.

The Ligurian Apennine is the border between the fitogeographic regions of Middle Europe and the Mediterranean; it connects the Alpine and peninsular Apennine ranges. For these reasons, plus the noteworthy altitudinal gradient (from about 350 metres asl at the confluence with the Trebbia up to the about 1800 of Monte Maggiorasca) different plant species from diverse environments thrive here. The Ligurian Sea is quite near, furthermore, to the upper part of the valley: some of the summits that surround it, as Monte Ramaceto or Monte Aiona, overlook valleys whose waters run directly into the sea.

As for animal life, the Val d'Aveto is still home to several wild species as: badgers, porcupines, foxes, boars, stone martens, wildcats and even wolves. Among the avian species many birds of prey, among which notably the long-eared and little owl, buzzard, and falcons plus many other species, including the cuckoo, finch and thrush, to quote some.
