= Fontevivo Abbey =

Former Cistercian monastery in Fontevivo, Italy

Coordinates: 44°51′28.34″N 10°10′33.88″E

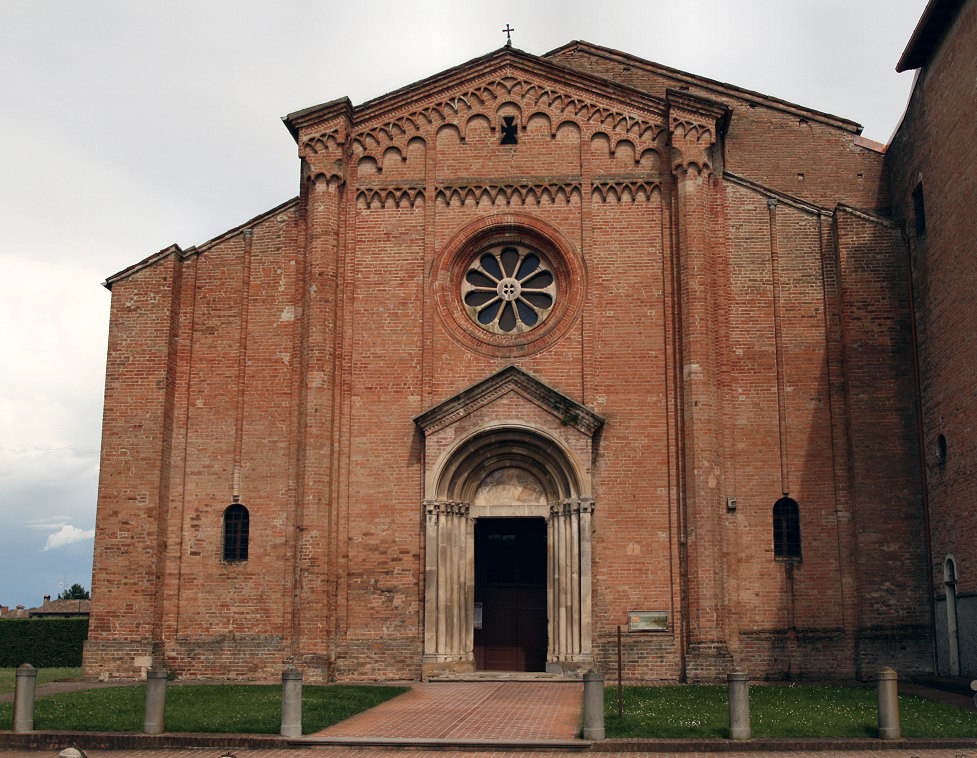
The abbey church of Saint Bernard

Fontevivo Abbey (Italian: Abbazia di Fontevivo; Latin: Fons Vivus) is a former Cistercian monastery in Fontevivo, Province of Parma, Emilia-Romagna, Italy, about 15 kilometres west of Parma on the Via Emilia towards Fidenza.

== History ==
In May 1142 a colony of twelve Cistercian monks from the abbey of Chiaravalle della Colomba founded a monastery on land given by Bishop Lanfranco of Parma and Delfino, son of Oberto Pallavicino, in a spot named Fontevivo ("living spring") after the spring that rose there on the left bank of the Parola brook.

After clearing and improving the site, which was a well-watered one between the Taro and the Stirone rivers, the Cistercians turned to construction and had soon built a large abbey church and the accompanying conventual buildings. In 1144 Pope Lucius II confirmed to Viviano, the first abbot, possession of the abbey's lands and put it under the immediate protection of the Holy See.

The newly settled abbey, as a daughter house of Chiaravalle della Colomba, belonged to the filiation of Clairvaux. As early as 1146 Fontevivo was made the mother house of the abbey of San Giusto in Tuscania. (Mirteto Abbey near Pisa may also have been made a daughter house of Fontevivo in 1227).

In 1245 the abbey was occupied and sacked by the army of the Emperor Frederick II during the siege of Parma. By the 15th century its decline was unstoppable, accelerated by the introduction of commendatory abbots early in the century and by the damage caused by the troops of Ludovico il Moro in 1483. In 1497 Fontevivo entered the Italian Cistercian Congregation, but by this time was already fatally compromised.

In 1518 Pope Leo X united it with San Paolo fuori le Mura in Rome, thus transferring it to the Benedictine Cassinese Congregation. It was at this point that the great majority of the abbey's archives was lost. The property and temporal jurisdiction of the abbey was acquired by Ranuccio I Farnese, Duke of Parma, in 1605. In 1614 the Cassinese transferred the spiritualities to the Benedictines of the abbey of Saint John the Evangelist in Parma, which was independent of the bishops of Parma, as Fontevivo had been as a territorial abbey. Only when it was finally merged into the Diocese of Parma in 1893, when the Benedictines gave it up, did the bishops gain authority over it, and have since used the honorary title of "Abbot of Fontevivo".

== Buildings ==
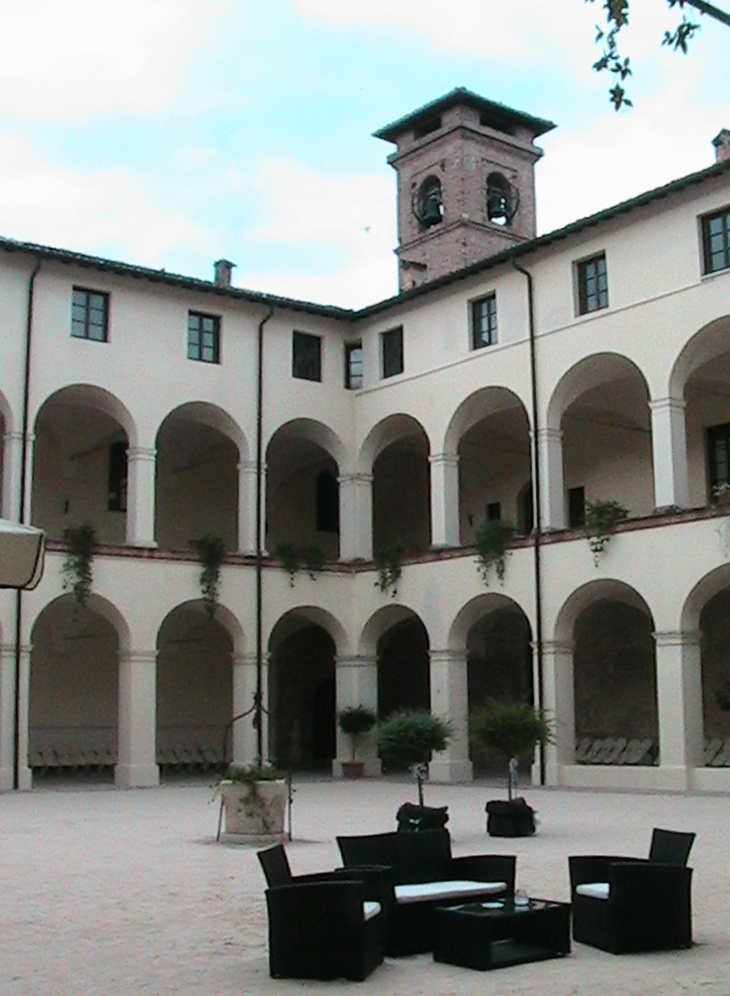
The courtyard of the former Villeggiatura del Collegio dei Nobili, on the former cloister

The only surviving building of the abbey is the former abbey church, now the parish church of Fontevivo, dedicated to Saint Bernard. The Villeggiatura del Collegio dei Nobili, an accommodation block now converted to flats, was constructed on the site of the conventual buildings in 1733 for the use of the Collegio, based in Parma, during the holidays. The arcaded courtyard preserves the outline of the cloister.

The abbey church, in the shape of a Latin cross, has a modest transept with two side chapels in each wing (those in the north wing are walled up), and a square apse. The nave has a central aisle and two side aisles, each of six bays. Instead of groin vaulting as originally intended, the church has rib vaulting. The construction of the vault over the crossing is unusual.

The brick west front, a three-part staggered gable front with a rose window containing ten radiating marble columns, was rebuilt by the monks in the 15th century and has since been much worked over. A Lombard band runs around much of the church.

A niche in one of the aisles holds a 12th-century Madonna and Child, a small polychrome stone statue recently attributed to Benedetto Antelami.

In the north transept is the red marble tombstone, dated 1301, of the Marchese Guido Pallavicini, a knight templar and a benefactor of the abbey. At the end of the north aisle is the Classical tomb in bronze and marble of the last Duke of Parma of the pre-Napoleonic period, Ferdinand of Bourbon (died 1802), by the Spanish architect Francesco Martin Lopez.

== Bibliography ==
- Bedini, Balduino Gustavo, 1964: Le abazie cisterciensi d’Italia, pp. 36–37. o.O. (Casamari). No ISBN
- Kauffmann, Georg, 1971: Reclams Kunstführer Italien IV (2nd ed.), p. 266. Stuttgart: Philipp Reclam jun.
- Stocchi, Sergio, 1986: Romanische Emilia-Romagna, pp. 259–260. Würzburg: Echter Verlag. ISBN 3-429-01010-1
