= San Giusto Abbey, Tuscania =

Former Cistercian monastery in Italy

Cistercian Abbey of San Giusto
- Location within Italy

Monastery information
- Order: Cistercian
- Established: 1146
- Disestablished: 1460
- Mother house: Abbey of Fontevivo
- Diocese: Tuscania

Site
- Location: Tuscania, Italy
- Coordinates: 42°23′09″N 11°52′29″E
- Public access: yes

The Abbey of San Giusto (Italian: L’abbazia di San Giusto in Tuscania) is a former Cistercian monastery located in the valley of the river Marta approximately 4 km south of Tuscania, Province of Viterbo, Italy.

== History ==
The Valle del Marta was settled in ancient times by Etruscans and Romans. The first known monastery on the site was an early medieval Benedictine monastery, mentioned in documents of the tenth century, but later abandoned. In the middle of the twelfth century, the Cistercian abbey of Fontevivo (near Parma), a daughter house of Clairvaux (France), sent a group of monks to resettle the site on July 26, 1146, a date confirmed by the later Decretals of Pope Honorius III (1216–1227). On April 2, 1178, during the abbacy of Abbot Donatus, Pope Alexander III (1159–1181) granted considerable privileges and apostolic protection to abbati monasterii Sancti Iusti prope Tuscanellam ordinis Cistercensis (“the abbot of the Cistercian monastery of San Giusto near Tuscania”). Soon after, relations between San Giusto and Fontevivo soured, and the General Chapter (assembly) of the Cistercian Order condemned the abbot of San Giusto for irregularities. The condemnation was repeated in the General Chapter of 1202, when the abbot of San Giusto was deposed because of alleged lapses in monastic discipline.

Subsequently, San Giusto was placed under the control first of the Cistercian Abbey of Casamari and second under the control of S. Anastasio Abbey at Aquas Salvias, better known as Tre Fontane Abbey, by a papal bull (1255) of Pope Alexander IV (1254–1261). San Giusto appears to have still had abbots into the fourteenth century. The abbey was permanently suppressed in 1460, after which its buildings fell into disrepair.

The abbey photographed by Paolo Monti in 1970, before restoration

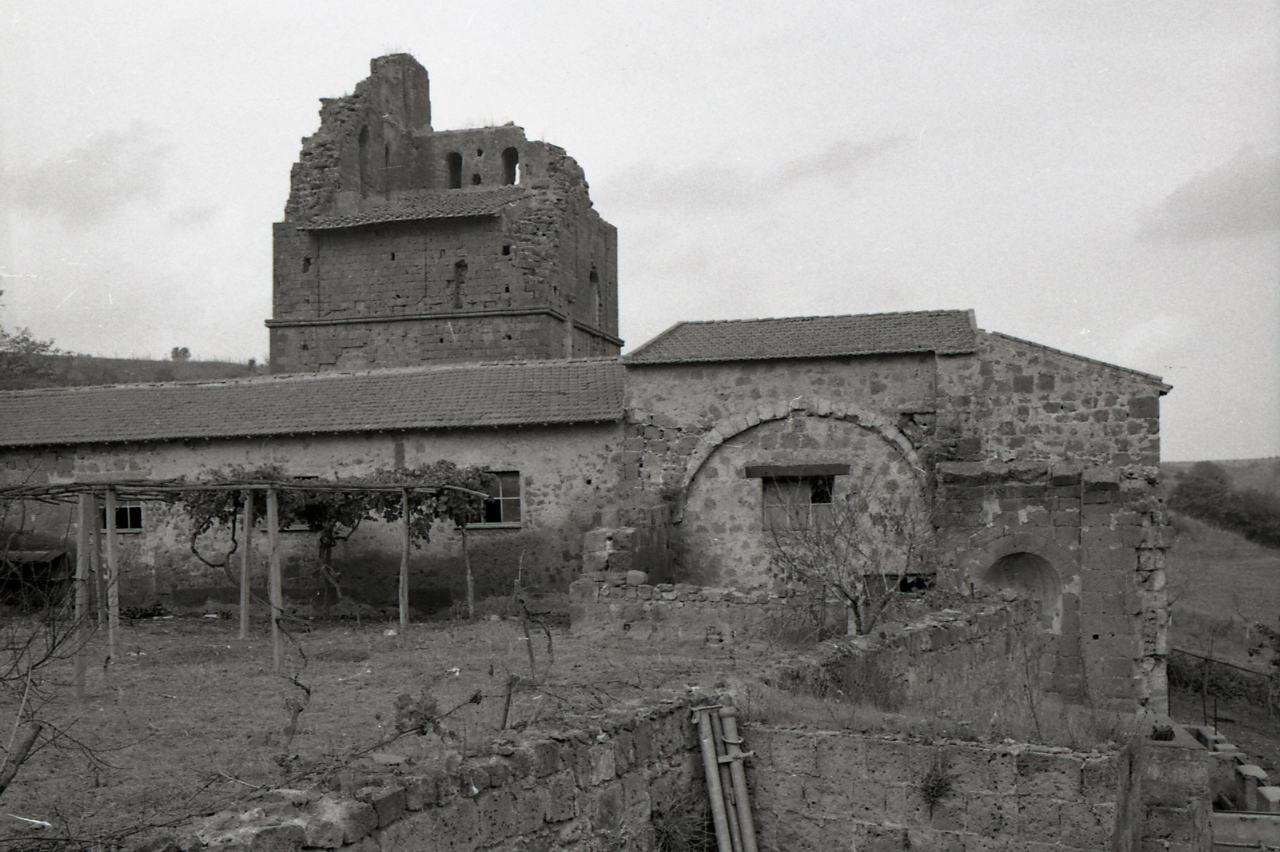
Exterior

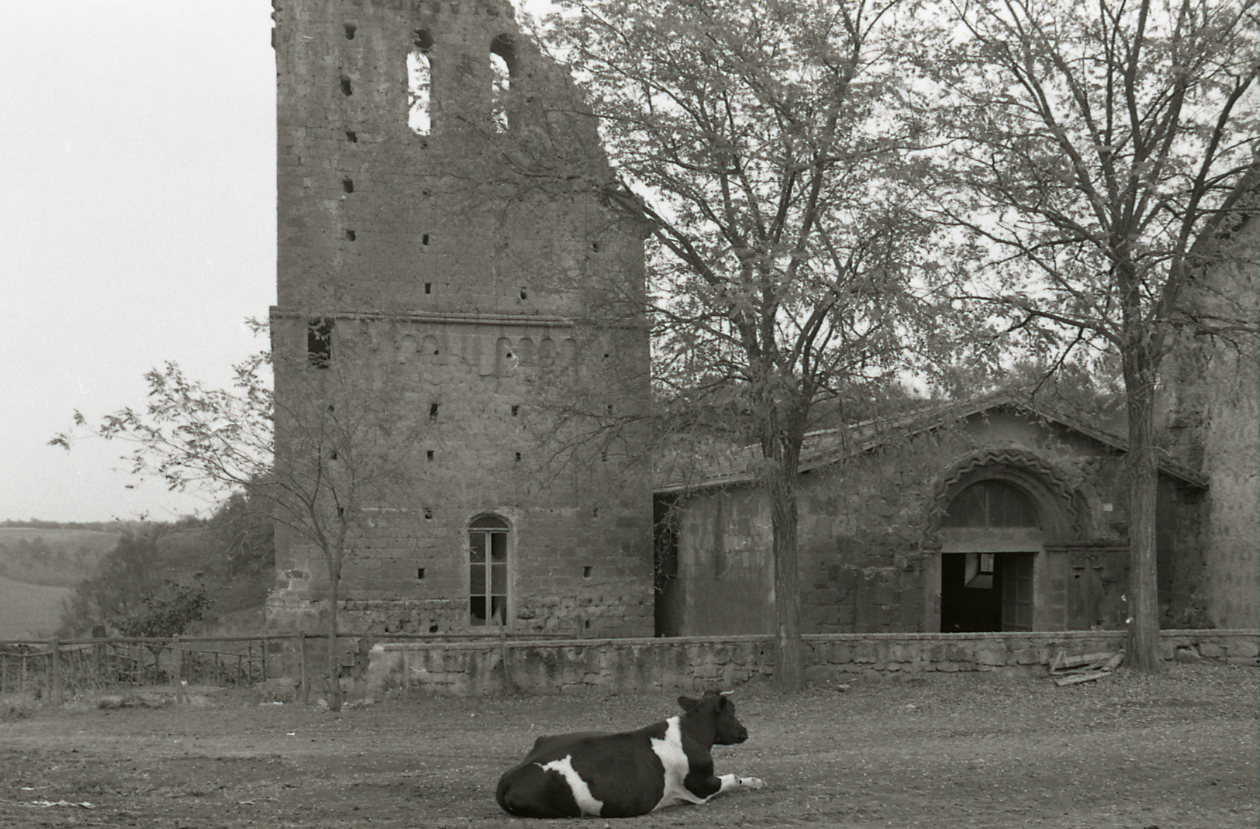
Exterior

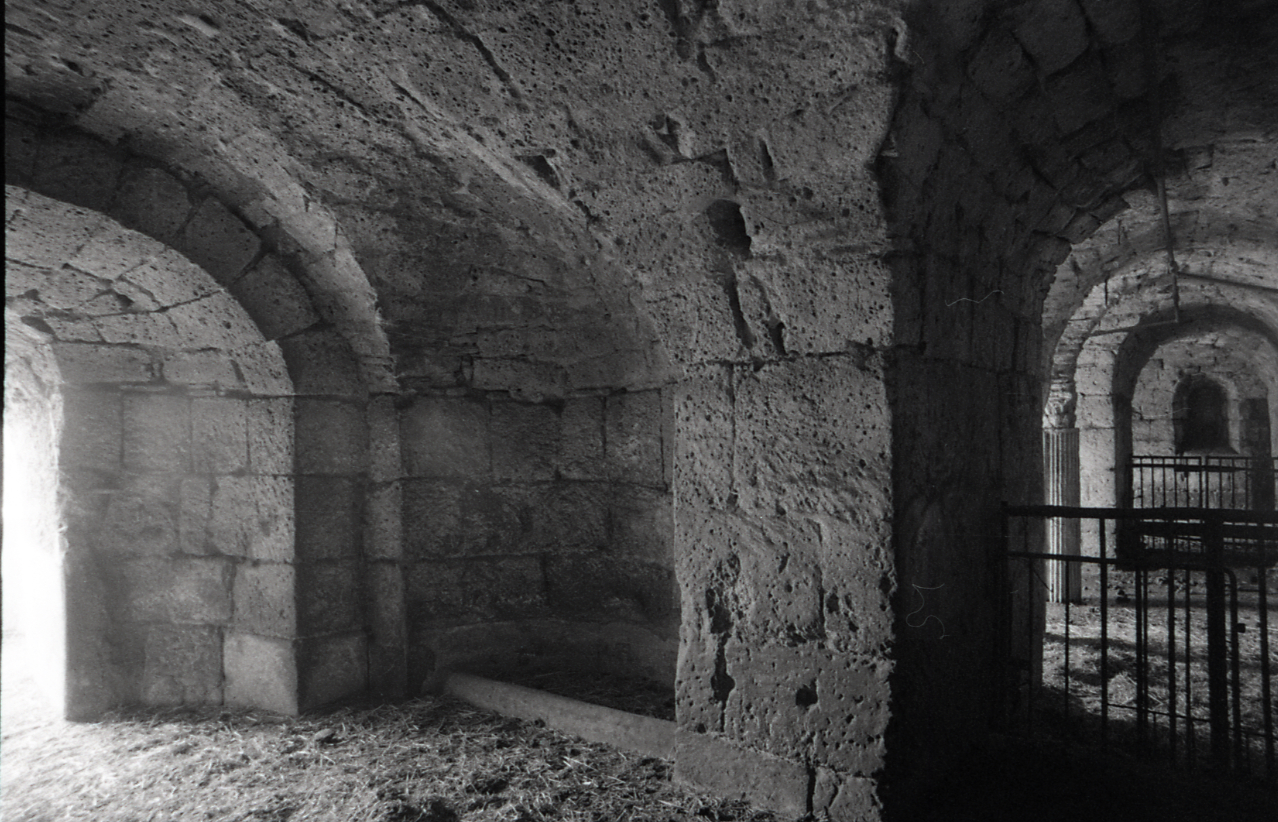
Interior

=== Restoration ===
The abbey fell into disuse after its suppression in 1460. In the mid-1990s, Mauro Checcoli, a Bolognese engineer and Olympic equestrian athlete, purchased the monastery from a sheep farmer. Checcoli excavated and restored the monastic site with the help of Italian archaeologist Giovanna Velluti.

=== Current Use ===
The Abbey of San Giusto in Tuscania functions as a bed and breakfast and a venue for events. The Checcolis also use the site to run an organic farm that produces essential oils from the area's lavender fields.

== Architecture ==
Architecturally, San Giusto is a typical Cistercian monastery of the mid twelfth century, with a church, tower, cloister, chapter house, parlor, scriptorium, refectory, cellarium, and two dormitories for the monks and lay brothers respectively. There appears to be enough room for about 20-24 monks and 20-24 lay brothers. The current church is divided into three sections: a presbytery for the monks by the altar, a middle section for lay brothers, and a third section, close to the portal, for guests, pilgrims, and the sick. Within the floor are remains of an older church upon which the Cistercian church was built. Two large furnaces used for making bells survive in the floor, currently under glass sheets. The crypt is typical of central Italy. The portal over the chapel bears the marble inscription: Rainerius levita et monach(us) hoc opus fieri iussit temporibus dominus Alberici humilis abbatis ("Rainerius deacon and monk ordered this work to be made in the time of Lord Alberic the humble abbot").

== See also ==
- List of Cistercian monasteries
- Cistercian architecture

== Bibliography ==
- G. Giuntella (1981). "Tuscania, S. Giusto". Monasticon Italiae (in Italian). Cesena: 186–187.
