= Lago di Giacopiane =

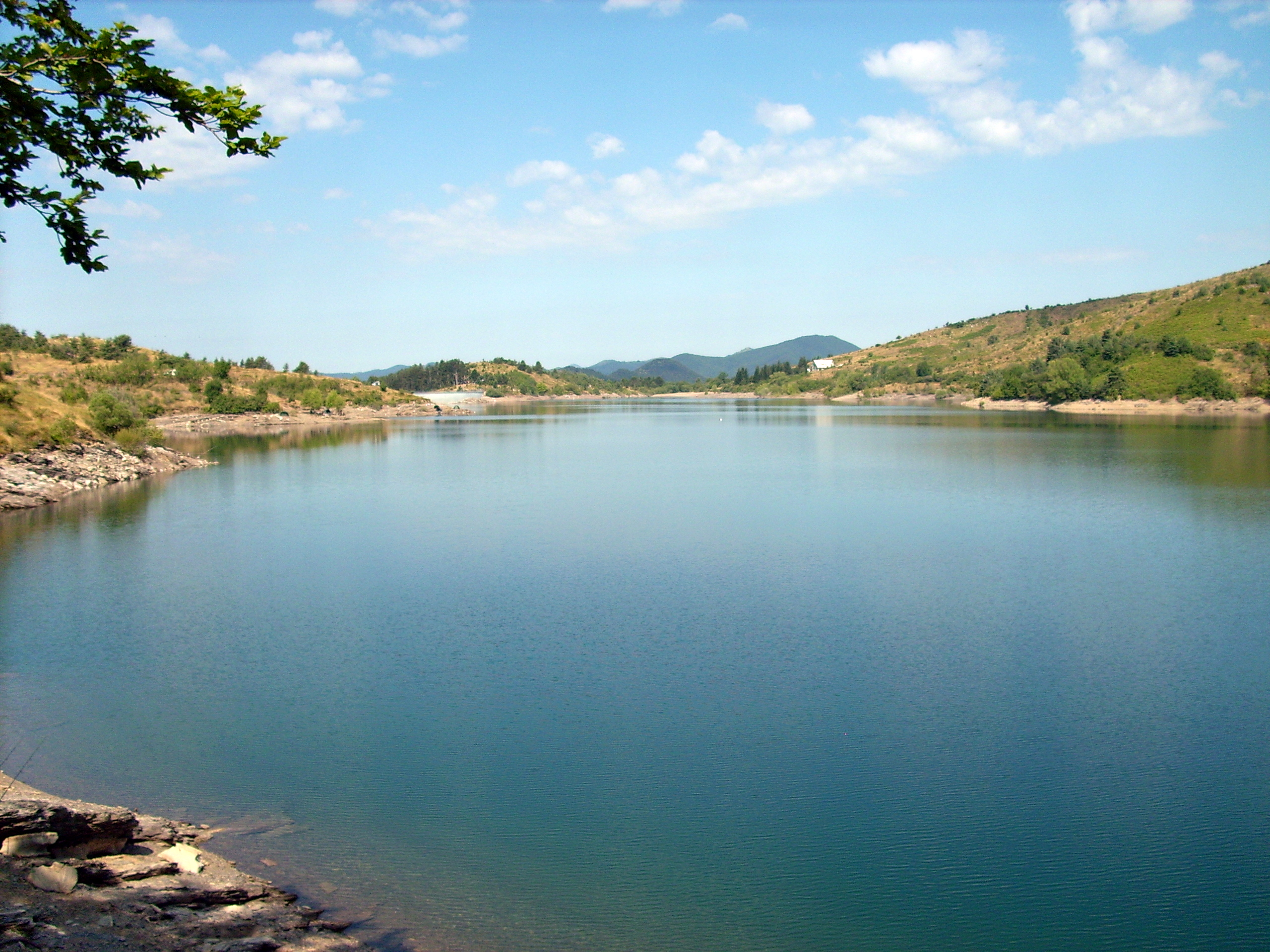

- Location within Italy
- Location: Borzonasca, Province of Genova, Liguria
- Coordinates: 44°27′40.26″N 9°23′41.36″E
- Type: reservoir
- Basin countries: Italy
- Surface elevation: 1,015 m (3,330 ft)

Lago di Giacopiane is an artificial lake in Borzonasca, Italy.
