= Rezzoaglio =

- Comune
- Comune di Rezzoaglio
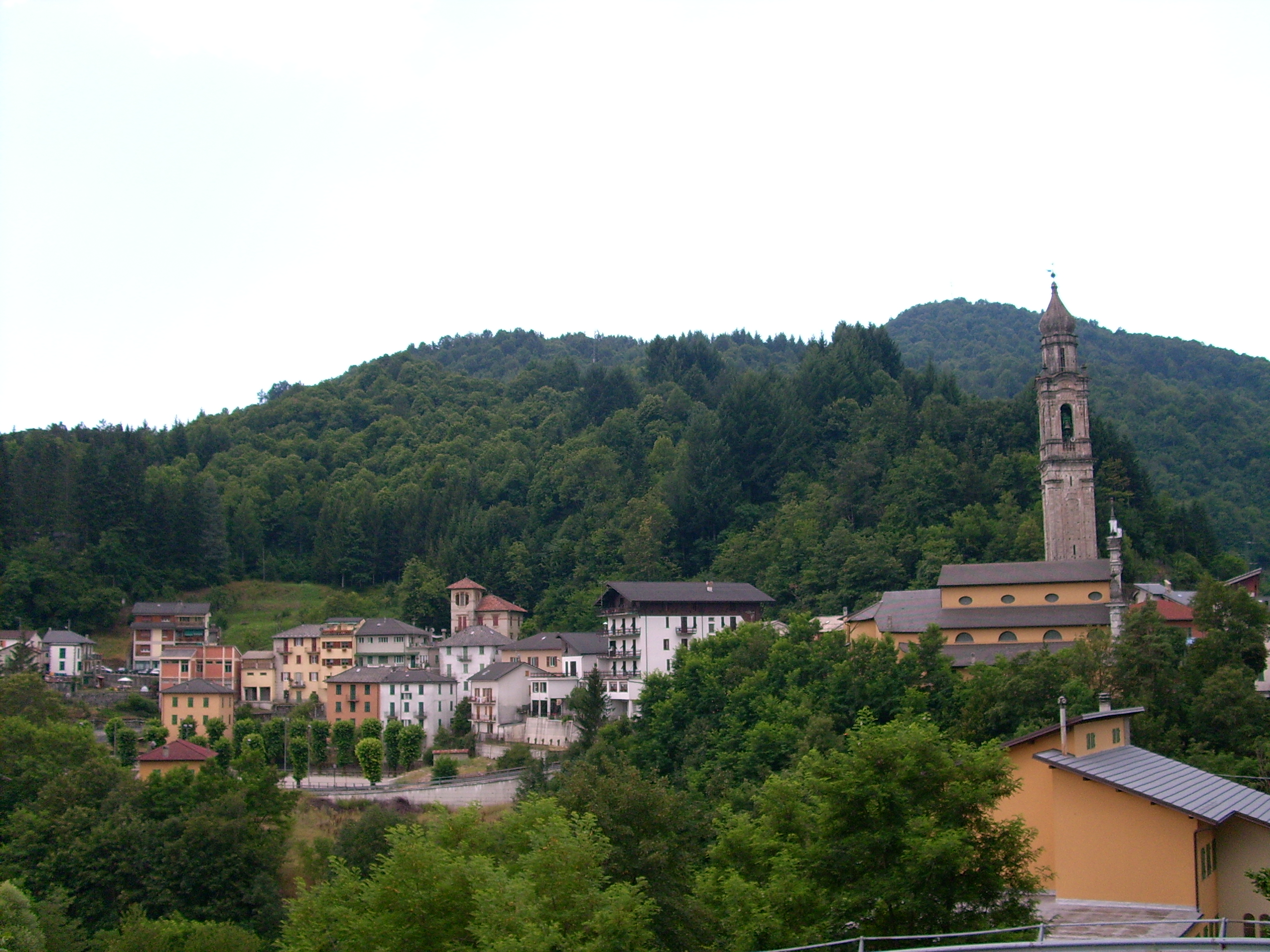
- Rezzoaglio

- Location within Italy Location within Liguria
- Coordinates: 44°32′N 9°23′E
- Country: Italy
- Region: Liguria
- Metropolitan city: Genoa (GE)
- Frazioni: Alpepiana, Brignole, Brugnoni, Cabanne, Ca' degli Alessandri, Calcinara, Calzagatta, Cardenosa, Casaleggio, Cascine, Cerisola, Villa Cerro, Chiappetta, Codorso, Cognoli, Costafigara, Costigliolo, Ertola, Esola, Farfanosa, Garba, Ghierto, Gragnolosa, Groparolo, Isola, Isolarotonda, Isoletta, Lovari, Magnasco, Mandriole, Mileto, Moglia, Molini, Monte, Noci, Parazzuolo, Pianazze, Piandifontana, Piandomestico, Villa Piano, Prato della Casa, Priosa, Rezzoaglio Inferiore, Villa Rocca, Roncopiano, Villa Salto, Sbarbari, Scabbiamara, Segaglia, Tecchia, Ventarola, Vicomezzano, Vicosoprano, Villa Cella, Villa Noce, Lago delle Lame

Government
  - Mayor: Marcello Roncoli

Area
  - Total: 104.72 km^{2} (40.43 sq mi)
- Elevation: 700 m (2,300 ft)

Population (31 May 2022)
  - Total: 867
  - Density: 8.28/km^{2} (21.4/sq mi)
- Demonym: Rezzoagliesi
- Time zone: UTC+1 (CET)
  - Summer (DST): UTC+2 (CEST)
- Postal code: 16048
- Dialing code: 0185
- Website: Official website

Rezzoaglio (Ligurian: Rezzoagi, locally Rosagni) is a comune (municipality) in the Metropolitan City of Genoa in the Italian region Liguria.

Rezzoaglio borders the following municipalities: Borzonasca, Favale di Malvaro, Ferriere, Fontanigorda, Lorsica, Montebruno, Orero, Ottone, Rovegno, San Colombano Certénoli, Santo Stefano d'Aveto.

== Geography ==
Rezzoaglio is located about 40 kilometres (25 mi) northeast of Genoa in the Aveto Valley near the Aveto torrent.

Rezzoaglio is part of the Aveto Natural Regional Park.
