= San Colombano Certénoli =

San Colombano Certenoli
- Comune
- Comune di San Colombano Certenoli
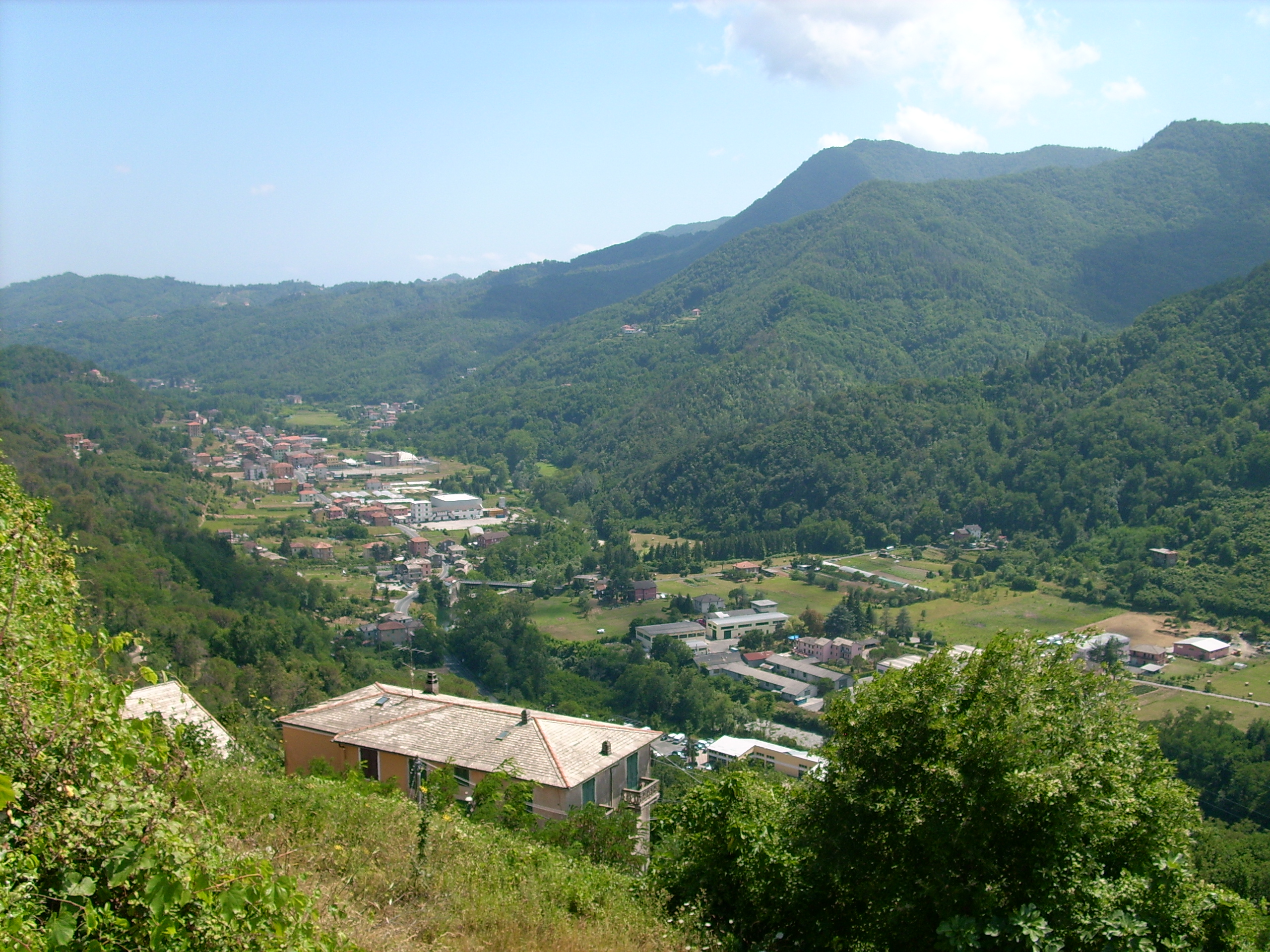

- Coat of arms

- Location within Italy Location within Liguria
- Coordinates: 44°22′N 9°19′E
- Country: Italy
- Region: Liguria
- Metropolitan city: Genoa (GE)
- Frazioni: Aveggio, Certenoli, San Colombano, San Martino del Monte, Camposasco, Romaggi, Cichero, Baranzuolo, Celesia

Government
  - Mayor: Carla Casella

Area
  - Total: 41.58 km^{2} (16.05 sq mi)
- Elevation: 40 m (130 ft)

Population (31 May 2022)
  - Total: 2,599
  - Density: 62.51/km^{2} (161.9/sq mi)
- Demonym: Sancolombanesi
- Time zone: UTC+1 (CET)
  - Summer (DST): UTC+2 (CEST)
- Postal code: 16040
- Dialing code: 0185
- Website: Official website

San Colombano Certenoli (Ligurian: San Comban) is a comune (municipality) in the Metropolitan City of Genoa in the Italian region Liguria, located about 30 kilometres (19 mi) east of Genoa. It is the largest municipality in the Val Fontanabuona.

San Colombano Certenoli borders the following municipalities: Borzonasca, Carasco, Coreglia Ligure, Leivi, Mezzanego, Orero, Rapallo, Rezzoaglio, Zoagli.
