= Ceno =

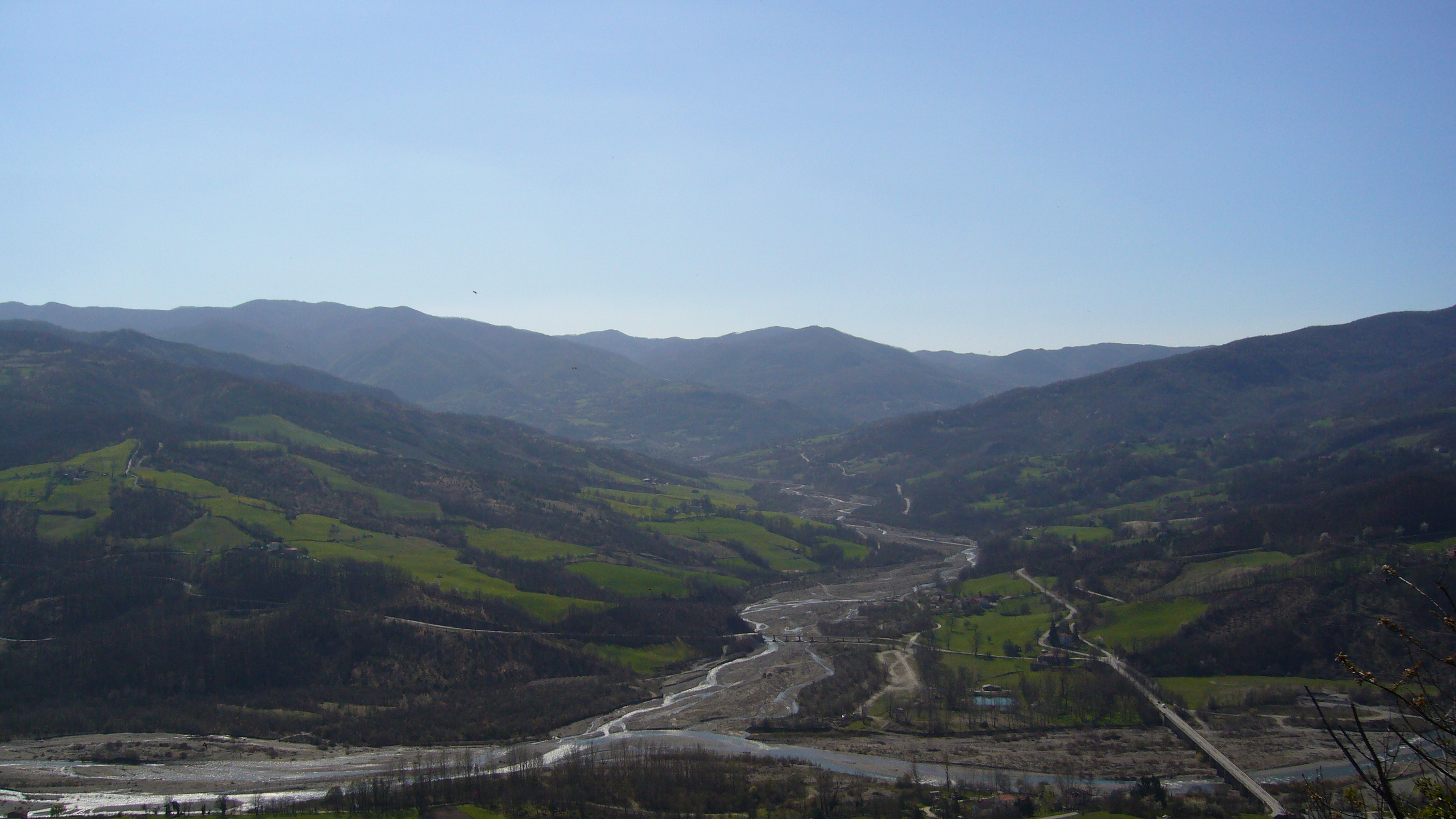
- The Ceno seen from the castle of Bardi

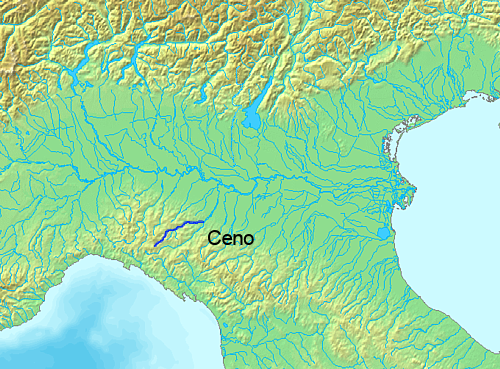
- Location of the Ceno in Italy

Location
- Country: Italy

Physical characteristics
- Source
  - location: Ligurian Apennines, Monte Penna
  - elevation: about 1,600 m (5,200 ft)
- Mouth
  - location: Taro, at Fornovo di Taro (PR)
  - coordinates: 44.6928°N 10.0919°E
- Length: 63 km (39 mi)
- Basin size: 540 km^{2} (210 mi^{2})
- Discharge
  - average: 12 to 15 m^{3}/s (420 to 530 cu ft/s)

Basin features
- Progression: Taro

The Ceno is a 63-kilometre (39 mi) tributary of the river Taro, flowing entirely within the Province of Parma, northern Italy. It joins the Taro on its left bank at Fornovo.

Like the Taro, the Ceno has its source on Monte Penna, in the Ligurian Apennine, though it rises on the opposite side of the mountain to the Taro. The Ceno's average final volume is approximately half that of the Taro, but can vary substantially depending on the season. Its discharge occasionally exceeds 1,000 cubic metres per second (35,000 cu ft/s). The Ceno is near Bardi.

== Course of the river ==
The Ceno originates from the Ligurian Apennines on the northern slopes of Monte Penna, just below the ridge, at an altitude of 1600 m.a.s.l. The side from which it rises is exactly opposite to the one on which the source of its hydraulic reference is located, the Taro River.

In the first stretch it flows into a rugged valley within the dense forest of the Penna, where it receives the contribution of some small streams. The first tributary of a certain importance is the Losa river which receives on the left hydraulic in the locality of Travaglini. Running through a small, wooded valley where small inhabited areas alternate with small rocks, including Casalporino, the Ceno reaches Anzola where it receives one of its main tributaries, the Anzola stream, from Monte Maggiorasca, the highest point of the Ceno watershed (1804 m.a.s.l.m.). After Anzola the torrent bends to the north-east always receiving to the left the Castelletti river.

Arriving at Ponteceno, the stream folds again decisively north, passing at the localities of Nociveglia and Fontanachiosa and receiving shortly afterwards, still to the left, the Rio Grosso. In this part of the river bed is gravel and it spreads hand in hand, snapping within dense forests alternating with small clearings.
