= Borzonasca =

- Comune
- Comune di Borzonasca
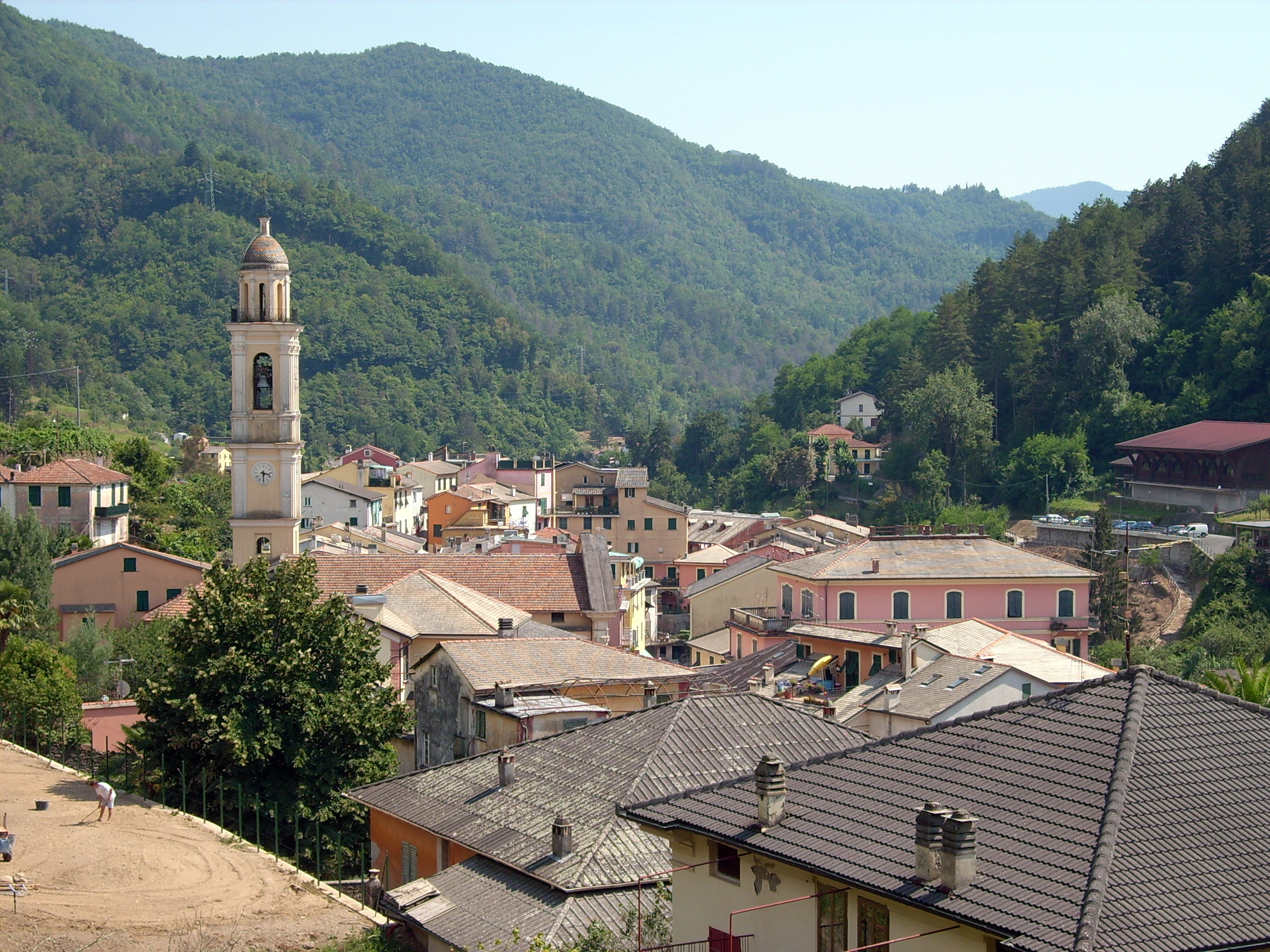
- Borzonasca

- Coat of arms

- Location within Italy Location within Liguria
- Coordinates: 44°25′N 9°23′E
- Country: Italy
- Region: Liguria
- Metropolitan city: Genoa (GE)
- Frazioni: Montemoggio, Belpiano, Temossi, Brizzolara, Sopralacroce, Levaggi, Caregli, Borzone, Giaiette, Acero, Gazzolo, Barca di Gazzolo

Area
  - Total: 80.51 km^{2} (31.09 sq mi)
- Elevation: 167 m (548 ft)

Population (30 April 2017)
  - Total: 2,072
  - Density: 25.74/km^{2} (66.66/sq mi)
- Demonym: Borzonaschini
- Time zone: UTC+1 (CET)
  - Summer (DST): UTC+2 (CEST)
- Postal code: 16041
- Dialing code: 0185
- Patron saint: Exaltation of the Holy Cross
- Saint day: September 14
- Website: Official website

Borzonasca is a comune (municipality) in the Metropolitan City of Genoa in the Italian region Liguria, located about 35 km (22 mi) east of Genoa.

Borzonasca borders the following municipalities: Mezzanego, Ne, Rezzoaglio, San Colombano Certénoli, Santo Stefano d'Aveto, Tornolo, and Varese Ligure.

Borzonasca is part of the Aveto Natural Regional Park.

== Main sights ==
- Church of St. Bartholomew (1628)
- Oratory of Sts. Philip and James (1554)
- Abbey of Borzone
- Abbey of St. Andrew, founded in 1184

== Twin towns ==
- Yara, Cuba
