= Fontevivo =

- Comune
- Comune di Fontevivo
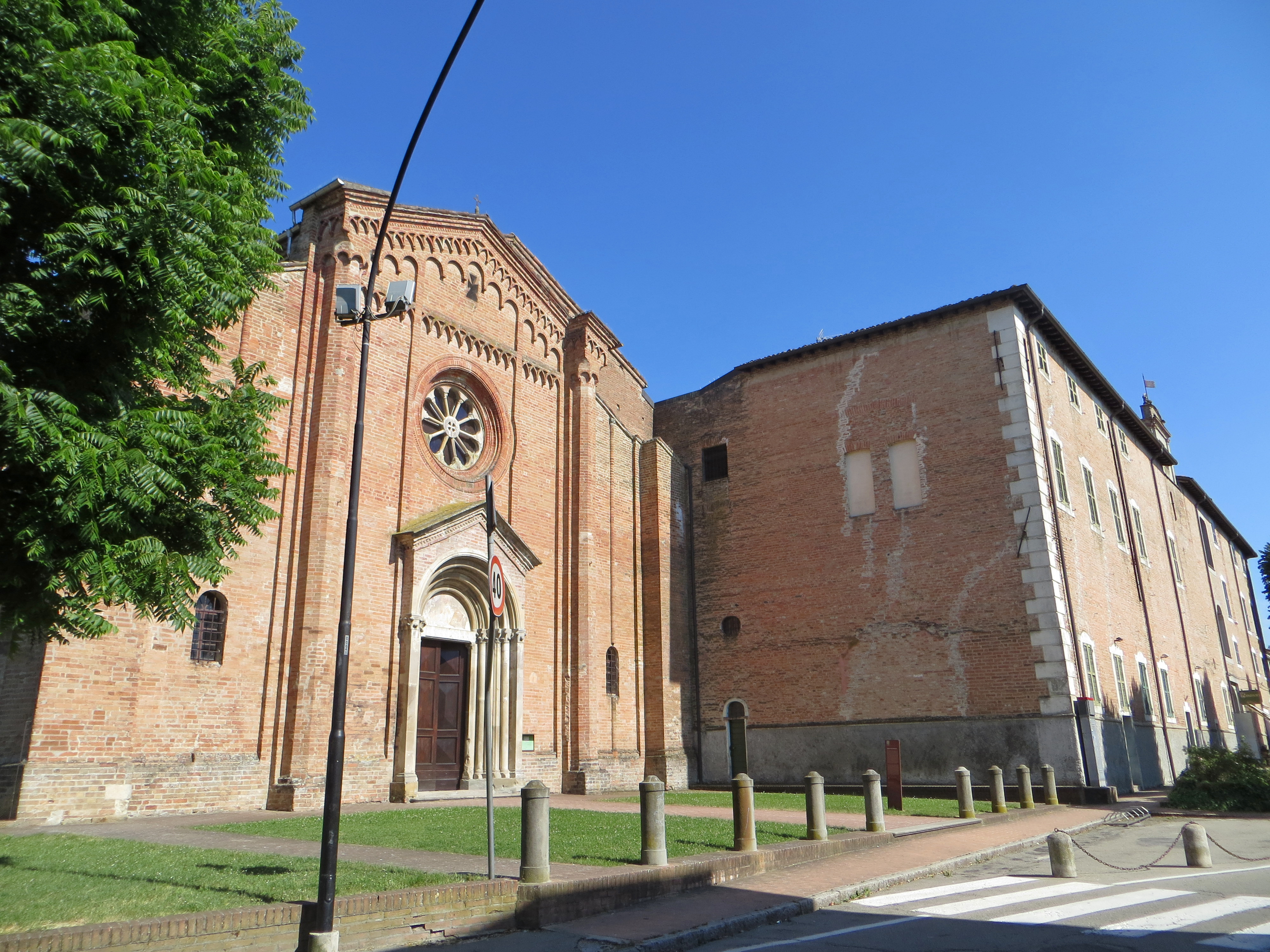
- Fontevivo Abbey

- Location within Italy Location within Emilia-Romagna
- Coordinates: 44°51′23.3″N 10°10′34.4″E
- Country: Italy
- Region: Emilia-Romagna
- Province: Province of Parma (PR)
- Frazioni: Bellena, Bianconese, Case Cantarana, Case Gaiffa, Case Massi, Fienilnuovo, Fondo Fontana, Fontane, Molinetto, Ponte Recchio, Ponte Taro, Recchio di Sotto, Romitaggio, Stazione Castelguelfo, Tarona, Torchio

Area
  - Total: 25.9 km^{2} (10.0 sq mi)

Population (Dec. 2004)
  - Total: 5,337
  - Density: 206/km^{2} (534/sq mi)
- Time zone: UTC+1 (CET)
  - Summer (DST): UTC+2 (CEST)
- Postal code: 43010
- Dialing code: 0521
- Website: Official website

Fontevivo (Parmigiano: Fontviv) is a comune (municipality) in the Province of Parma in the Italian region Emilia-Romagna, located about 100 kilometres (62 mi) northwest of Bologna and about 14 kilometres (9 mi) northwest of Parma. As of 9 October 2011, Fontevivo had a population of 5,428 and an area of 25.9 square kilometres (10.0 mi^{2}).

It is best known as the location of the former Fontevivo Abbey, the church of which now serves as the parish church.

The municipality of Fontevivo contains the frazioni (subdivisions, mainly villages and hamlets) Bellena, Bianconese, Case Cantarana I, Case Cantarana II, Case Gaiffa, Case Massi, Case Rosi, Fondo Fontana, Fontane, Molinetto, Ponte Recchio, Ponte Taro, Recchio di Sotto, Romitaggio, Stazione Castelguelfo, and Torchio.

Fontevivo borders the municipalities of Fontanellato, Noceto, and Parma.

== Demographic evolution ==
Historical population

Year	Pop.	±%
1861	2,721	—
1871	2,891	+6.2%
1881	2,992	+3.5%
1901	3,466	+15.8%
1911	4,164	+20.1%

Year	Pop.	±%
1921	4,619	+10.9%
1931	4,538	−1.8%
1936	4,420	−2.6%
1951	4,650	+5.2%
1961	4,246	−8.7%

Year	Pop.	±%
1971	4,178	−1.6%
1981	4,244	+1.6%
1991	4,542	+7.0%
2001	4,874	+7.3%

Source: Data from ISTAT
