= Francesco Cura =

American actor and singer

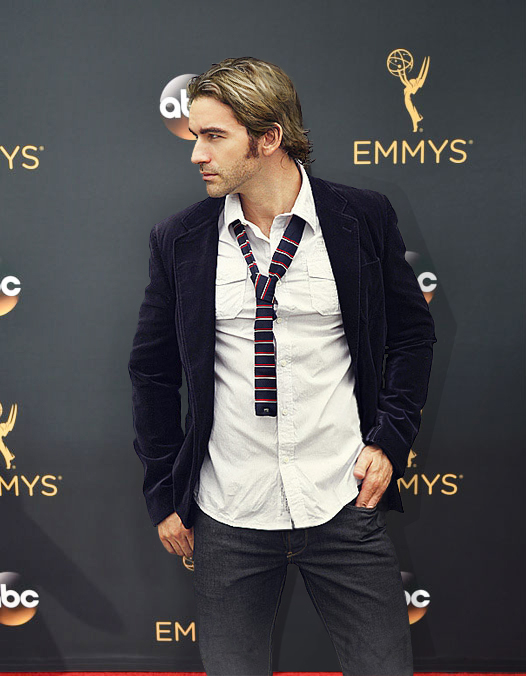
- Francesco Cura (Francis J Cura) at the 2016 Emmy Awards
- Born: Francesco Maria Cura; 7 March 1977 (age 49); Parma, Italy
- Occupation: Actor

Francesco Cura (born 7 March 1977), is an American actor, singer, and fashion model. Sometimes credited as Francis J. Cura or Francesco Maria Cura, he has starred in feature films such as Hannah Can't Swim, Singularity, The Deep and Dreamless Sleep, and The Wizards Return: Alex vs. Alex. He has also guest starred in such series as Criminal Minds and Scrubs.

== Biography ==
Francesco Cura was born in Parma, Italy but spent much of his youth traveling between Italy and the United States. His father, Arturo Cura, was an Italian painter, author and independent film director. Francesco was immersed in the arts from a young age and often appeared in his father's television and stage productions. He has one sister, Valentina Cura, who is also an artist.

Cura studied art history, graphic design, sculpting, portraiture, typography and lithography at the prestigious Institute of Arts P. Toschi in Parma and graduated with honors. He then moved to Milan to work as a male fashion model and enrolled in a classical vocal training program for Opera where he developed a four-octave vocal range.

In 1998 Cura moved to New York City where he studied acting at the Lee Strasberg Theatre and Film Institute. Following his move, he began to appear in numerous stage productions and, after moving to Los Angeles in 2003, primarily in film and television roles.

== Partial filmography ==
- Criminal Minds (2008) (US TV)
- Singularity
- The Deep and Dreamless Sleep
- Scrubs (2003) (US TV)
- Hannah Can't Swim (2002)
- The Swamp (2012) (US TV) Episodes: Traffic Jam (2012) The Hike (2012)
- JoyCamp (TV Series) Episodes: Illuminate with Fluoride (2012) P.S.A. Conspiracy Theorist (2012)
- The Book of Daniel (credited as Francis J. Cura) (2013)
- The Wizards Return: Alex vs. Alex (TV Movie) (2013)
- Bridget Jones's Baby (2016) (as Sexy Santa)
