= Via Aemilia =

Roman road in northern Italy, built in 187 BC

Schematic map of the Via Aemilia through the Roman Empire's Regio VIII Aemilia

Route of Via Aemilia (in light brown, between Placentia and Ariminum)

The Via Aemilia (Italian: Via Emilia, English: Aemilian Way) was a trunk Roman road in the north Italian plain, running from Ariminum (Rimini), on the Adriatic coast, to Placentia (Piacenza) on the River Padus (Po). It was completed in 187 BC. The Via Aemilia connected at Rimini with the Via Flaminia, which had been completed 33 years earlier, to Rome.

== History ==
The land today known as northern Italy (Italia settentrionale) was known to the ancient Romans during the republican period (to 44 BC) as Gallia Cisalpina (literally: Gaul on the near – i.e. southern – side of the Alps) because it was then inhabited by Celtic tribes from Gaul, who had colonised the area in the 4th and 5th centuries BC.

Italia meant the area inhabited by Italic tribes: the border between Italia and Gallia Cisalpina was roughly a line between Pisae (Pisa) and Ariminum. Gallia Cisalpina contained the Pianura padana (Po river plain). This vast country, by far the largest fertile plain in the mountainous peninsula, contained potentially its best agricultural land, and offered the Romans the opportunity to expand enormously their population and economic resources by mass colonisation.

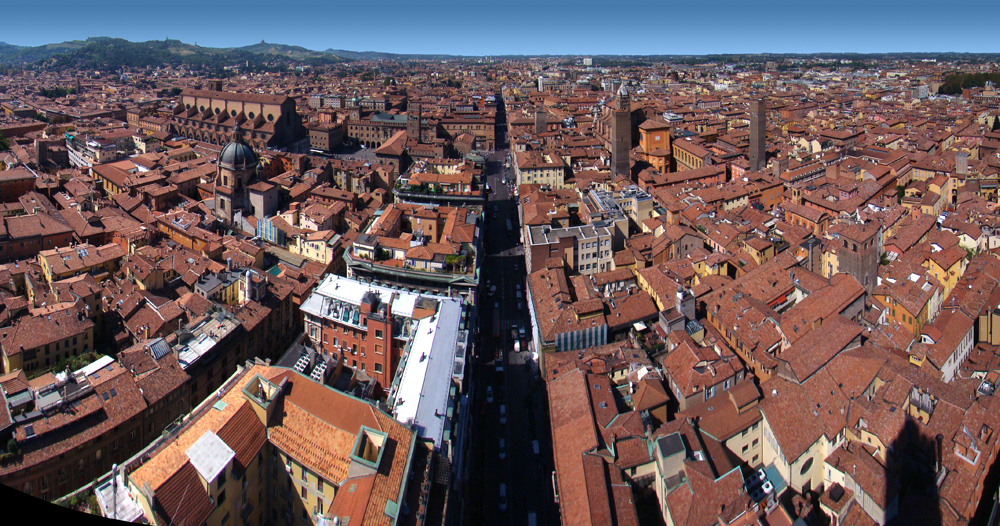
The Via Aemilia crossing Bologna

The Romans subjugated the Gauls of the Pianura Padana in a series of hard-fought campaigns in the late 3rd century BC. By 220 BC, the Via Flaminia was completed, providing the Romans with ready access to the region. However, Roman expansion was delayed for some twenty years by the Second Punic War. During the Carthaginian general Hannibal's invasion of Italy (218 BC–203 BC), Roman military control of the Pianura Padana was temporarily overthrown. Many of the recently defeated tribes (such as the Insubres and the Boii) rebelled and joined forces with Hannibal in the hope of regaining their independence.

It was not until 189 BC that the rebel tribes had been pacified sufficiently to allow work on the Via Aemilia to begin.

The time-tested Roman method of expansion was to build a road straight through the newly conquered territory, and then establish a string of colonies, either of civilian settlers or of military veterans along its route. The settlers would be allocated fertile plots from lands confiscated from the defeated native peoples. This was the precise function of the Via Aemilia: its period of construction also saw the foundation of Roman colonies along its whole length at Bononia (Bologna) (founded 189 BC), Mutina (Modena), Regium (Reggio Emilia), and Parma (all founded in 183 BC).

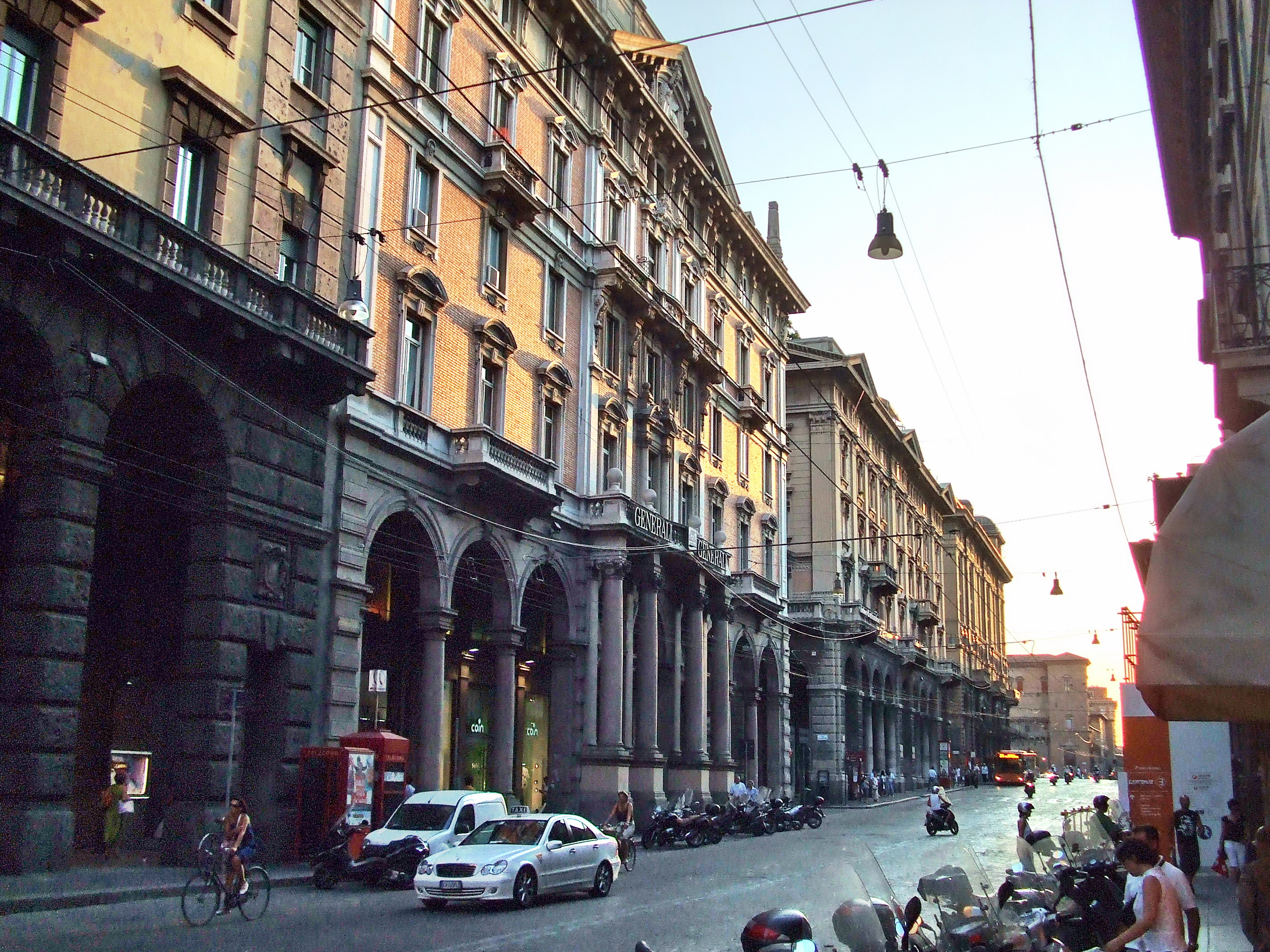
The Via Emilia as it crosses central Bologna. This modern street, known in this stretch as the Via Rizzoli, overlies the old Roman road, which bisected the Roman colony of Bononia.

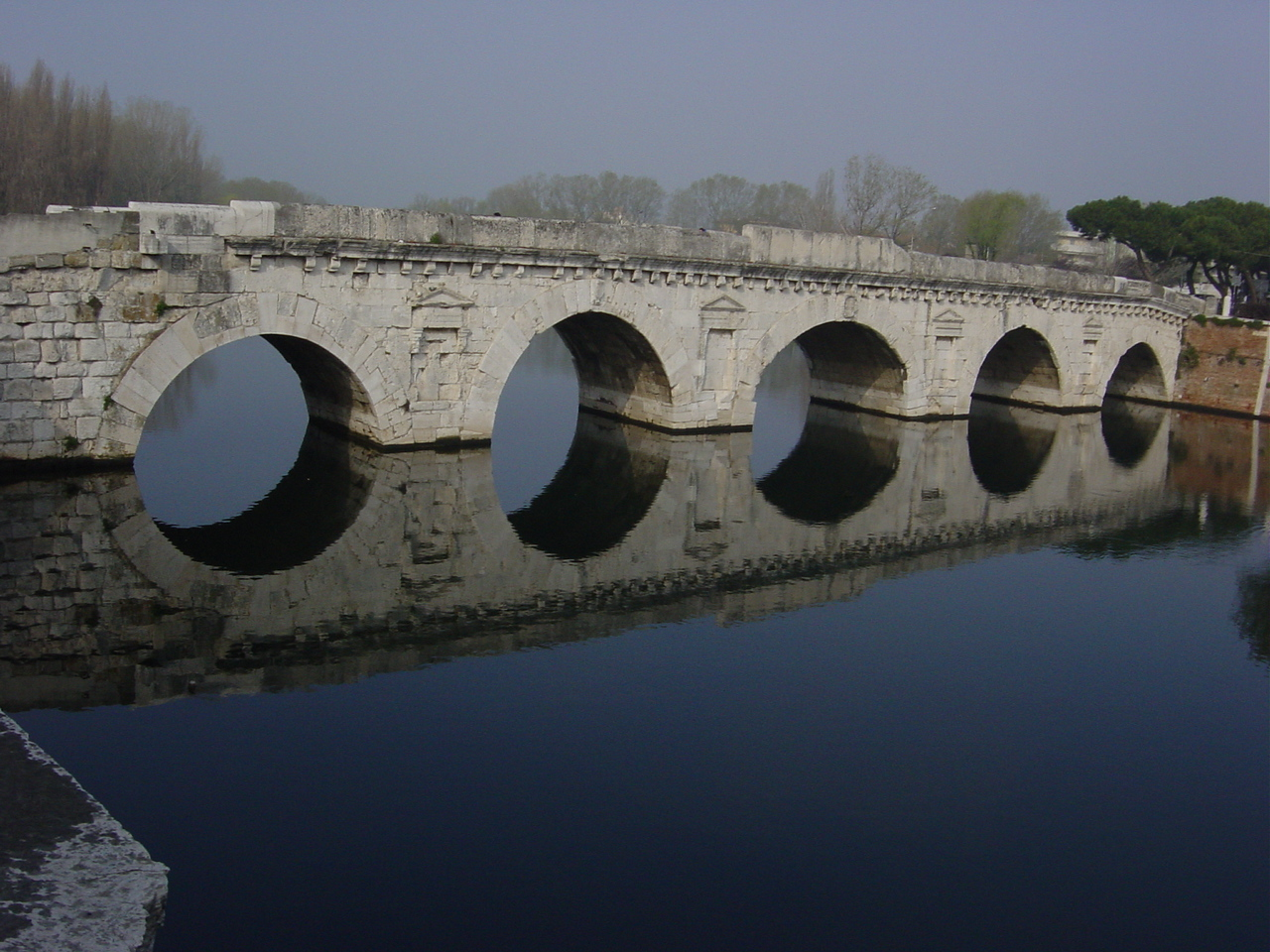
Roman bridge over the River Marecchia just outside Ariminum (Rimini), the starting point of the Via Aemilia. Today known as the Ponte Tiberio, it was built in 14 AD under Roman emperor Tiberius as part of a major upgrading of the whole Via Aemilia started under his predecessor Augustus.

The Via Aemilia was completed by, and named after, the Roman consul Marcus Aemilius Lepidus in 187 BC. It was built, on elevated embankments, in part, on top of an older road system that linked the Adriatic to the Tyrrhenian Sea. The consular road ran, largely in a straight line, 176 Roman miles (260 km) NW from Rimini to its termination at Piacenza, connected pre-existing towns, such as Piacenza, Bologna and Rimini.

The road ran along the southern edge of the flat Pianura Padana within sight of the northern foothills of Italy's Apennine Mountains, crossing numerous tributary rivers of the Po, notably the Rubicon near Rimini and the River Trebbia near Piacenza. In the century following the construction of the Via Aemilia, Piacenza became the key Roman road hub in the pianura padana. In 148 BC, the Via Postumia linked Piacenza to Aquileia on the north Adriatic coast. In 109 BC, the consul Marcus Aemilius Scaurus completed the Via Aemilia Scaura to Genua (Genoa) and Pisae (Pisa).

== Bridges ==
There are the remains of several Roman bridges along the road, including the Ponte d'Augusto, Ponte di Sant'Arcangelo di Romagna, Ponte San Vito, Ponte sul Reno, Ponte sul Rubicone, and Ponte sul Taro.

At Rimini, the starting point of the Via Aemilia, the road's Ponte di Tiberio still exists, a massive structure spanning the River Marecchia, started by the Emperor Augustus and completed by his successor Tiberius. It still bears its twin dedicatory inscriptions.

At Bologna, milestone 78 was found in the bed of the River Reno. It records Augustus' reconstruction of the Aemilia, in 2 BC, from Rimini as far as the River Trebbia. Remains of the Aemilia bridge over the Reno were found in the 1890s, consisting of parts of the parapets from each side. These were originally 38.75 feet apart, of Veronese red marble.

The bed of the river was found to have risen at least 20 feet since this bridge collapsed in the 9th century. Ruins of some of the other ancient Roman bridges still exist.

At Savignano sul Rubicone a Roman bridge survived until it was demolished as recently as World War II. The current bridge is a reconstruction.

== Legacy ==
The construction of the Via Aemilia launched the intensive Roman colonisation of the Pianura Padana. The vast agricultural potential of this region soon rendered it the most populous and economically important part of Italy, overshadowing Central Italy, Rome and the South.

The area remains economically preeminent in modern Italy. By the time of the Second Triumvirate (44 BC – 30 BC), Romanisation of this formerly Celtic country was so complete that the province of Gallia Cisalpina was abolished and its territory incorporated into the heartland province of Italia.

The road gave its name to that part of Gallia Cisalpina through which it ran. This area was, before the Roman conquest, the territory of the Gallic tribes Boii (who gave their name to the city of Bologna) and Senones. It was already commonly referred to as Aemilia by the time the Emperor Augustus assumed sole power. In around 7 BC, when Augustus divided the provincia of Italia into 11 regiones (administrative districts), the area became the eighth regio. This initially had the official name of Padus, but was later changed to Aemilia.

The western part of this area is still known as Emilia today. The boundaries of the Roman VIII regio roughly corresponded to those of the modern Italian administrative region of Emilia-Romagna. Its inhabitants are today known as Emiliani. The modern Italian State Road 9 is still officially called Via Emilia and follows the Roman route over much of its length. Indeed, the modern road in many parts lies directly above the Roman road.

== See also ==
- Roman bridge
- Roman engineering
