= Bedonia =

Bedonia Bedònja (Ligurian)
- Comune
- Comune di Bedonia
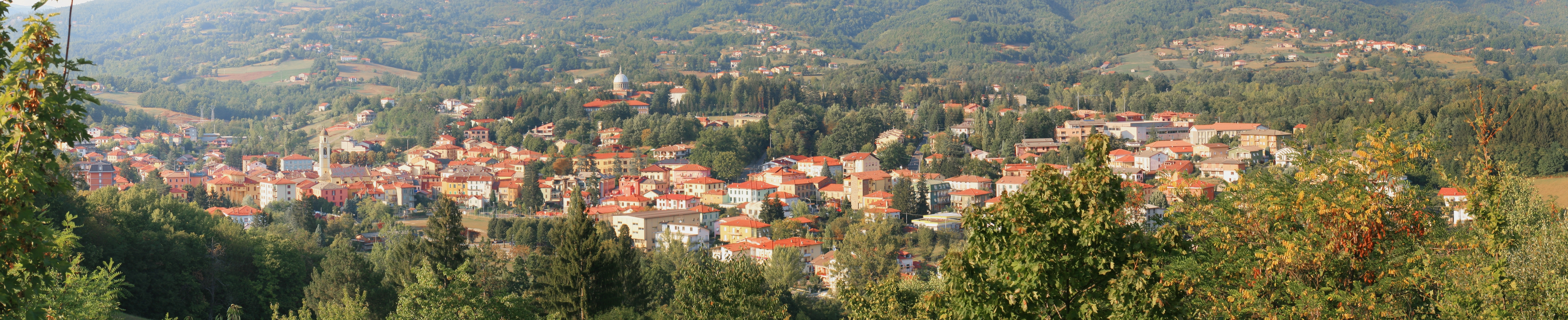

- Location within Italy Location within Emilia-Romagna
- Coordinates: 44°30′N 09°38′E
- Country: Italy
- Region: Emilia-Romagna
- Province: Parma
- Frazioni: Alpe, Anzola, Bruschi di Sopra, Bruschi di Sotto, Calice, Caneso, Carniglia, Casaleto, Casalporino, Casalmurata, Castagna, Castagnola, Cavignaca, Ceio, Chiesiola, Cornolo, Drusco, Fontanachiosa, Foppiano, Illica, Lagasi, Le Coste, Libbia, Liveglia, Masanti di Sopra, Masanti di Sotto, Momarola, Montarsiccio, Monti, Nociveglia, Piane di Carniglia, Pilati, Ponteceno, Prato, Revoleto, Rio Merlino, Romezzano, Roncole, Salarolo, Scopolo, Selvola, Setterone, Spora, Strepeto, Tasola, Tomba, Travaglini, Volpara

Government
  - Mayor: Carlo Berni

Area
  - Total: 167 km^{2} (64 sq mi)
- Elevation: 500 m (1,600 ft)

Population (31 December 2014)
  - Total: 3,526
  - Density: 21.1/km^{2} (54.7/sq mi)
- Demonym: Bedoniesi
- Time zone: UTC+1 (CET)
  - Summer (DST): UTC+2 (CEST)
- Postal code: 43041
- Dialing code: 0525
- Patron saint: Saint Anthony
- Website: Official website

Bedonia (Parmigiano: Bedònja; Ligurian: Bedònja; locally Pieve) is a comune within the Province of Parma, in Emilia-Romagna, northern Italy.

== History ==
The communal territory was already settled during the Neolithic age, and later was a Roman colony, under the name of Bitunia. From the 11th century it was a fief of the bishops of Piacenza, and later of the Malaspina. In 1257 it was included in the State of the Landi, to which it belonged until 1682, when it was confiscated by the Duchy of Parma. During the Unification of Italy, the population was protagonist of an insurrectionary movement for the annexation of the country to Piedmont. In recent times Bedonia has been given an important role as a remembrance community that contributed to the Partisan fights (during World War II). In the life of Bedonia an important role of cultural promotion has been carried out from the Seminary, instituted in 1846 from Mons. Giovanni Agazzi and Stefano Grapnels.

== Main sights ==
The city, just a few miles away from Liguria, is characterized by colorful buildings of obvious Ligurian influence.

=== Religious structures ===
- Sant'Antonino: Baroque church in the historical center
- Basilica della Madonna di San Marco with adjacent Seminario Vescovile (built in 1846). In addition to being a functioning Roman Catholic seminary, the building houses a small Planetarium, a Museum of Natural History, a Xylographic Exposition of the works of Romeo Musa, an art gallery and a large National Library.
- Oratorio dei Disciplinati, added its bell tower to the skyline of the town up until 1950. Due to issues related to the structure's alleged instability, the tower was demolished and the church was deconsecrated.
- Sanctuary of the Madonna di San Marco (Madonna of S. Mark), built in 1939, houses one wooden statue created in 1531 representing the Enthroned Madonna with Child.

=== Secular and natural sites ===
The ancient Arc of Entrance to the old town is now being included in the system of the "Peschiera Park". Also, in Via Trieste (Trieste street) there is a historical building that shows the Landi family symbol.

North of the town, the Mountain Pelpi reaches 1,410 metres (4,630 ft), on top of which there is a huge cross. It is a pilgrimage site after a miracle of the Virgin Mary occurred over a century ago.

In the center of the village a river runs (Pelpirana) which converges a few miles after into the Taro River.

A few kilometers west, the tallest mountain (Monte Penna) reaches about 1,745 metres (5,725 ft). It is also a pilgrimage place and a suggestive rocky peak surrounded by green forests. However the province lies between 468 and 1,745 metres (1,535 and 5,725 ft) above sea level.

During recent years, many sporting structures have been built (swimming pool, camping, tennis fields, etc.).

== Economy ==
Tourism is important to the local economy. The area is dependent on summer tourists drawn by the natural environment of the surrounding countryside.

Amenities which support the local tourist economy include modern sports complexes (swimming-pools, tennis courts, volleyball and basketball courts, skating and football) and an equipped camping complex, which is situated on one of the hills in the area. The swimming pool is a major tourist attraction in the town.

Also available are mushroom picking opportunities which includes the world famous Porcino Valtarese.

== People ==
- Francesco Cura
- Franco Nero
