= Taro (river) =

River in Emilia-Romagna, in northern Italy

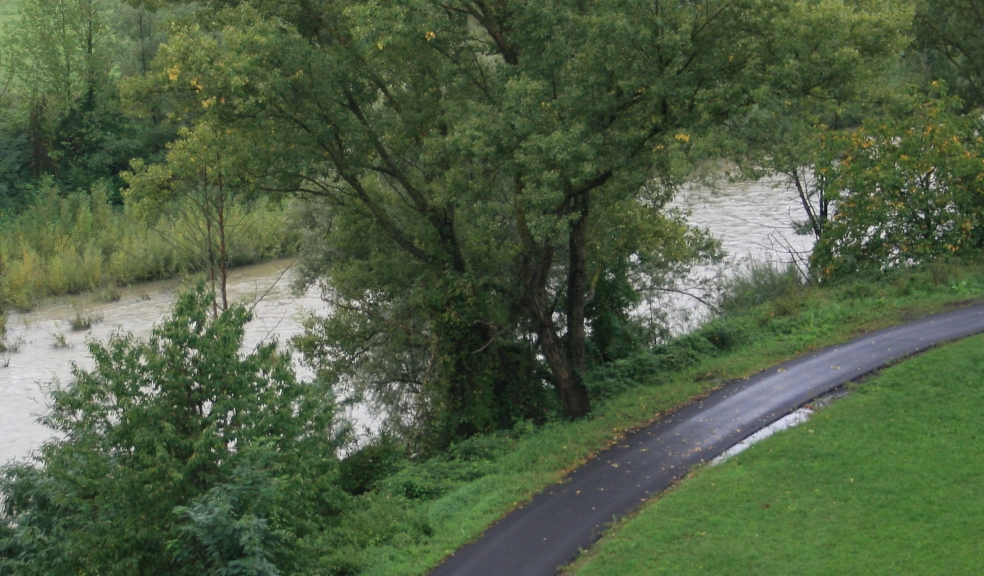
- The Taro at Borgotaro

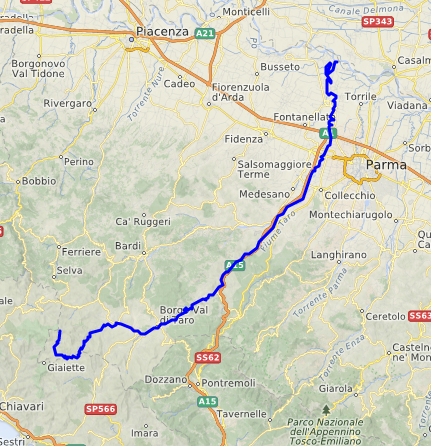
- Course of the Taro.

Location
- Country: Italy

Physical characteristics
- Source
  - location: Ligurian Apennines, Monte Penna
  - elevation: about 1,300 m (4,300 ft)
- Mouth
  - location: Po near Gramignazzo (PR)
  - coordinates: 45.0022°N 10.2558°E
- Length: 126 km (78 mi)
- Basin size: 2,026 km^{2} (782 mi^{2})
- Discharge
  - average: 30 m^{3}/s (1,100 cu ft/s)

Basin features
- Progression: Po→ Adriatic Sea
- Tributaries
  - left: Ceno, Stirone

The Taro (Latin Tarus) is a river in Emilia-Romagna, in northern Italy. It is a tributary of the Po and is 126 kilometres (78 mi) long. It flows almost entirely in the province of Parma, west of the city Parma. The Taro flows into the Po near Gramignazzo, a frazione of the comune of Sissa, north of Parma.

The Val di Taro, or Taro valley, the drainage basin of the river, occupies an area of 2,026 square kilometres (782 mi^{2}). The principal affluents of the Taro are the Ceno, Recchio and Stirone; others are the Gotra and Tarodine. Both the Taro and the Ceno rise on Monte Penna, elevation 1,735 metres (5,692 ft), in the Apennine Mountains on the border between the provinces of Genoa and Parma.

The river shows strong seasonal variability. In summer it can easily dry, while in rainy periods it can reach a discharge of 1,000 cubic metres per second (35,000 cu ft/s): this value can double on rare occasions, known as "centennial floods" (Italian: piene centennali), such as that of 9 November 1982.

The Val di Taro was of strategic importance during the Middle Ages, as it was traversed by the Via Francigena, the pilgrim route and main connection between Rome and France in that era.

About 20 kilometres (12 mi) of the river course between Fornovo di Taro and Ponte Taro constitutes the protected area of the Parco fluviale Regionale del Taro, the Taro regional natural park. The area of the park includes the river bed itself, with numerous islets of sand and gravel and wetland areas, and surrounding areas of woodland, scrub and cultivated soil; it has a wide variety of vegetation and fauna.

Following the French conquest of Italy in the Napoleonic Wars, the river gave its name to a département, the Département du Taro.
