= Aveto Natural Regional Park =

Protected area in Liguria, Italy

Coordinates: 44°29′N 9°26′E

- Parco naturale regionale dell'Aveto
- IUCN category V (protected landscape/seascape)
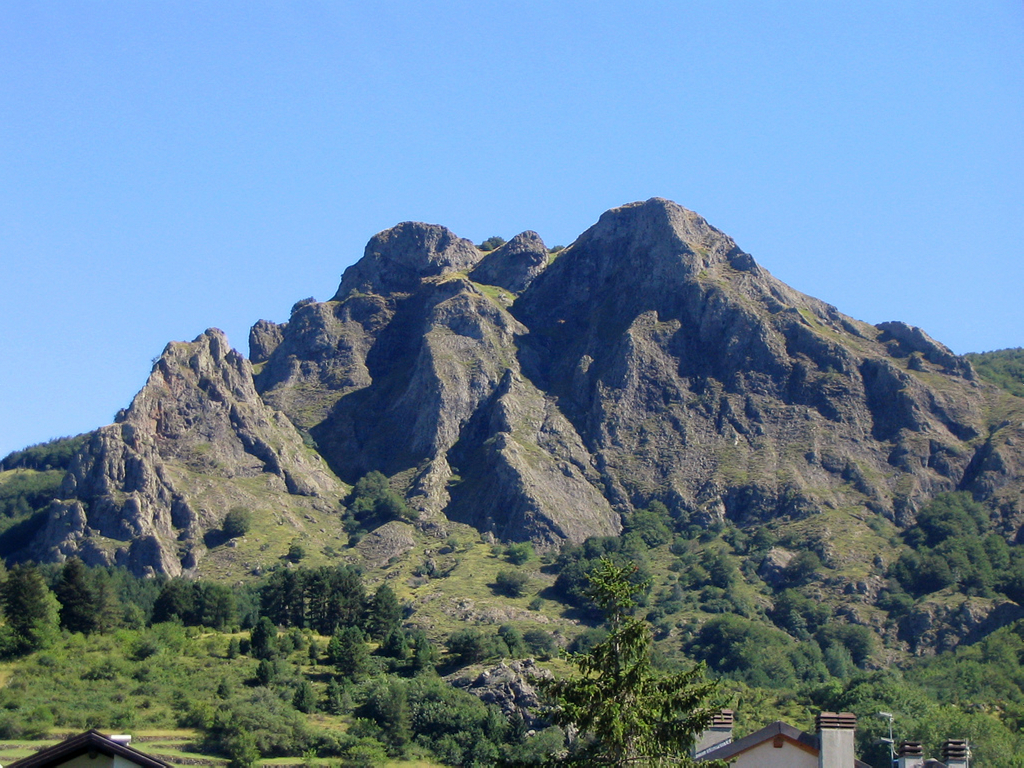

- Location within Italy
- Location: Metropolitan City of Genoa, Italy
- Nearest city: Genova
- Area: 3,018 ha (7,460 acres)
- Established: 1995
- Website: www.parcoaveto.it

The Aveto Natural Regional Park is a natural park in Metropolitan City of Genoa, in the Liguria region of northern Italy. It was established in 1995.

== Geography ==
Situated in the inland of the Tigullio area, Aveto Natural Regional Park protects one of the most beautiful and important areas of the Ligurian Apennines mountain range.

The protected territory, over 30 square kilometres (12 mi^{2}), includes three valleys, each with its particular features:

- high-mountain landscapes, grazing lands and large beech tree woods in Aveto Valley (Rezzoaglio, Santo Stefano d'Aveto);
- meadows where cattle graze, chestnut tree and hazelnut tree woods, vegetable gardens and olive groves in Sturla Valley;
- a well-preserved rural landscape with olive groves and vineyards, a great variety of rocks and minerals and therefore quarries and mines in Graveglia Valley.

The Lame lakes create perfect wet habitats for a very special small and rare Italian mushroom, the Calocybe gambosa, better known as dogfish.
