= Stirone =

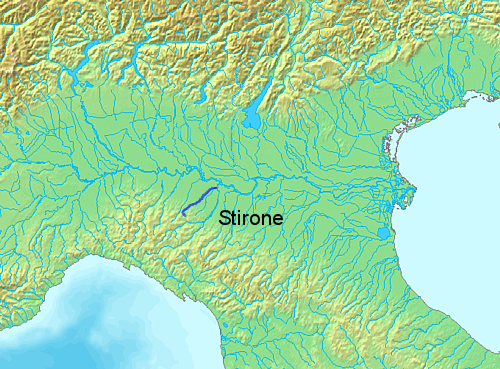

Location
- Country: Italy

Physical characteristics
- Source
  - location: Plain of Maneia, above Pellegrino Parmense
  - elevation: 695 m (2,280 ft)
- Mouth
  - location: Taro, near Fontanelle
  - coordinates: 44.9713°N 10.2331°E
- Length: 55 km (34 mi)

Basin features
- Progression: Taro→ Po→ Adriatic Sea

The Stirone is a small river of Emilia-Romagna in northern Italy, a left tributary of the Taro, which it joins shortly before the latter enters the Po.

The sources of the river are on the slopes of Monte Mezzano and Monte Santa Cristina. Part of the course of the river forms the boundary between the provinces of Piacenza and Parma. It then forms the basis of the Parco Regionale Fluviale Stirone, which is especially known for its fossils, and reaches the town of Fidenza. The river joins the Taro at Fontanelle, a frazione of Roccabianca.

According to tradition, Domninus of Fidenza was martyred on its banks in 304 AD.
