= Monte Penna =

Mountain in Italy

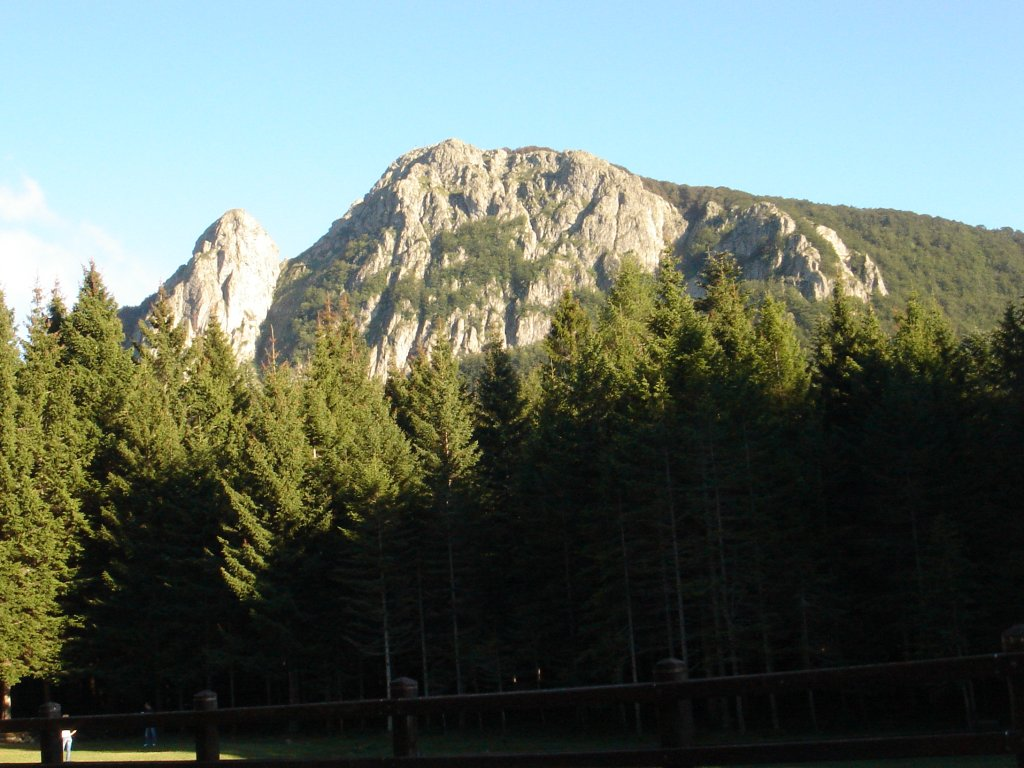

Highest point
- Elevation: 1,735 m (5,692 ft)
- Prominence: 384 m (1,260 ft)
- Coordinates: 44°28′52.9″N 9°29′34.1″E

Geography
- Location within Italy
- Location: Liguria/Emilia-Romagna, Italy
- Parent range: Ligurian Apennines

Monte Penna is a mountain (1,735 m) on the border between Liguria and Emilia-Romagna, northern Italy, part of the Ligurian Apennines. It is included in the Natural Regional Park of the Aveto, and overlooks the Val di Taro; the sources of both the Taro and Ceno Rivers are located in Monte Penna's slope.

The name derives from the ancient Celtic deity Penn, who was believed to reside here by the Ligures.
