= Monte Maggiorasca =

Mountain in Italy

Coordinates: 44°33′N 9°29′E

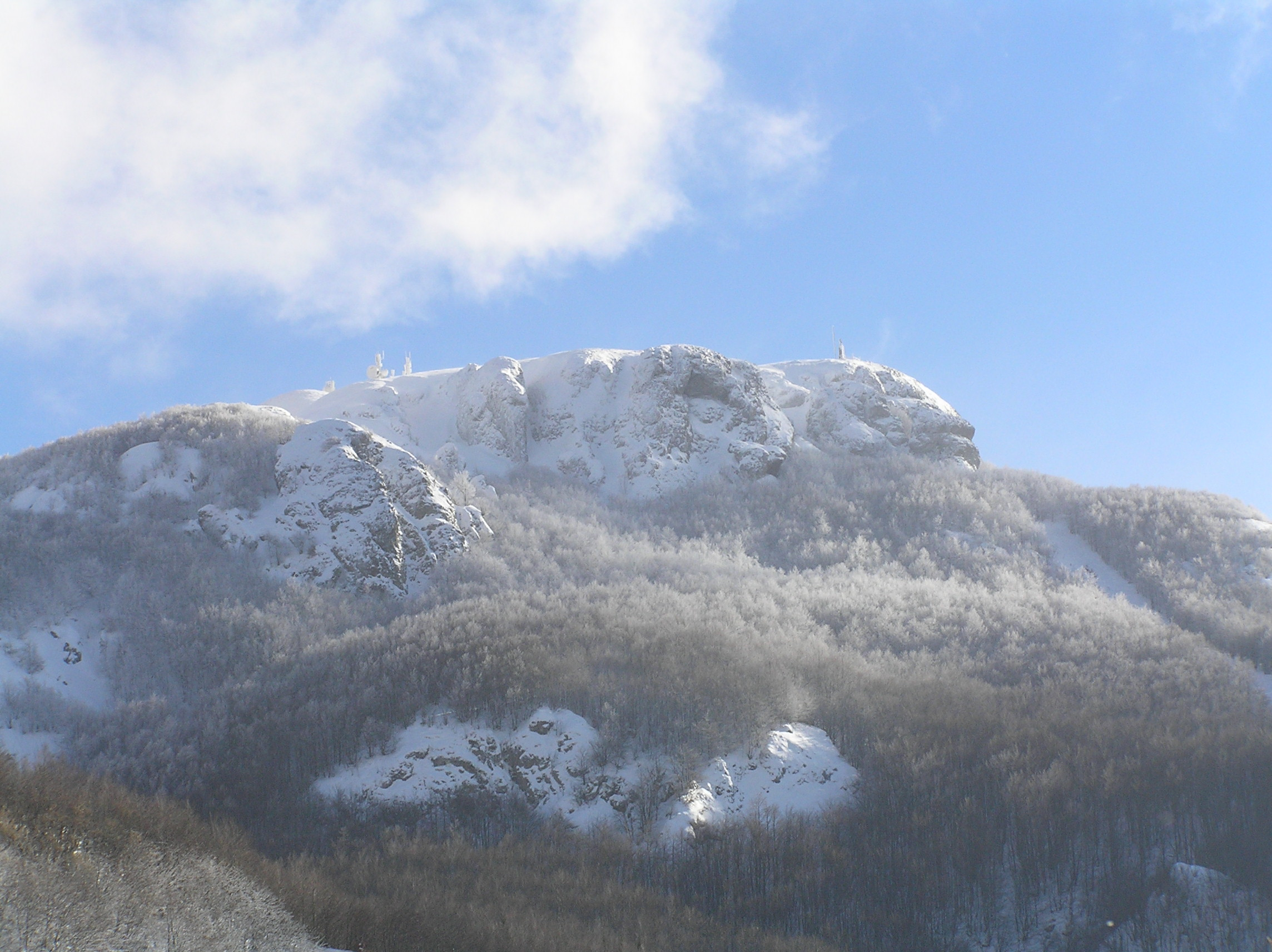
- Photo of winter 2005

Highest point
- Elevation: 1,804 m (5,919 ft)
- Prominence: 939 m (3,081 ft)
- Isolation: 42.87 km (26.64 mi)

Geography
- Location within Italy
- Location: Liguria/Emilia-Romagna, Italy
- Parent range: Ligurian Apennines

Monte Maggiorasca is a mountain on the border between Liguria and Emilia-Romagna, northern Italy.

== Geography ==
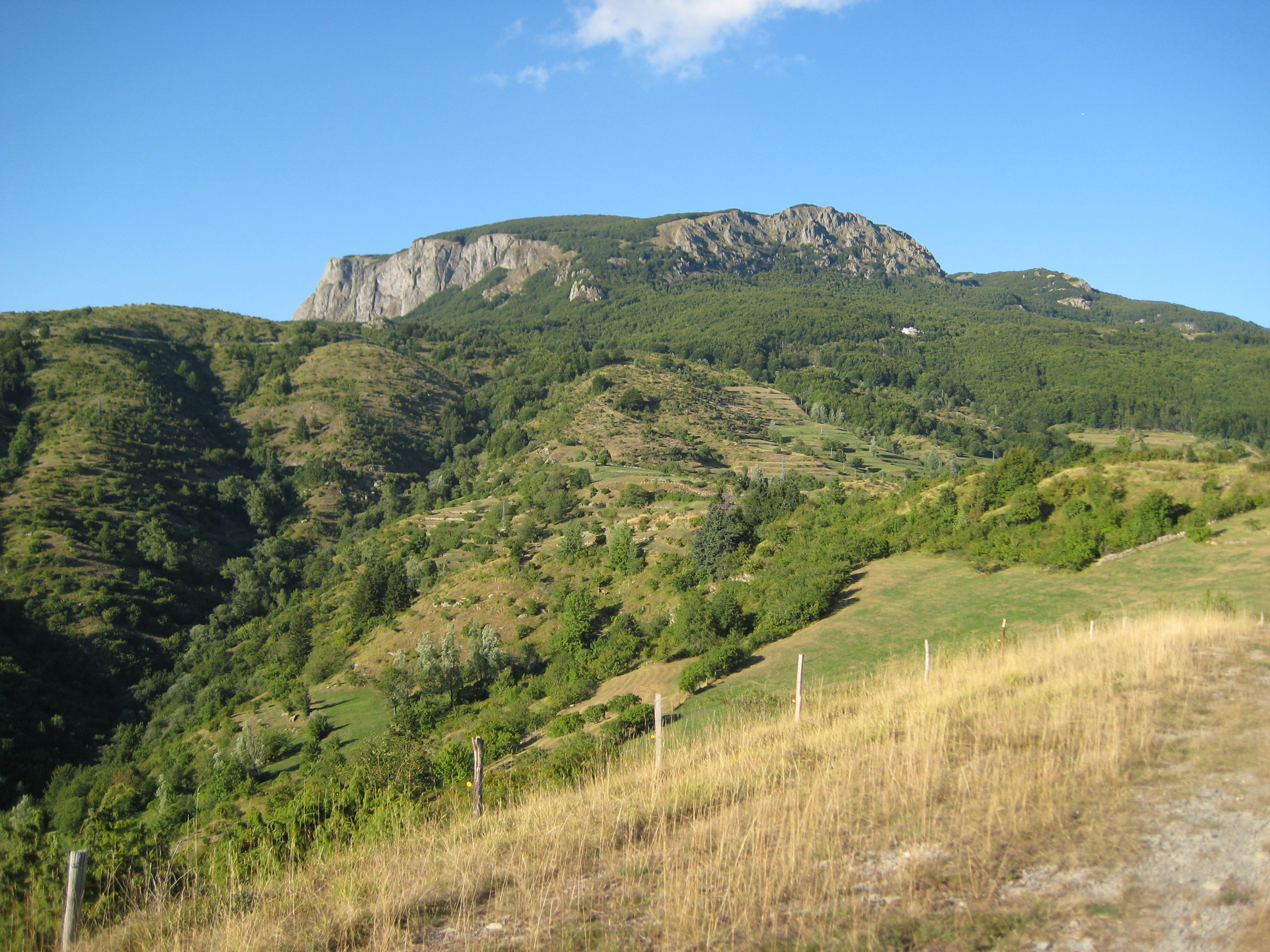
Summer view

The mountain is the highest peak (1,804 m) of the Ligurian Apennines.

It overlooks Val d'Aveto and Val Nure, and the comuni of Santo Stefano d'Aveto (province of Genoa) and Ferriere (province of Piacenza). On the summit is the statue of Our Lady of Guadalupe, erected in 1947 and a TV communication system.
