= Paula Ferrada =

Colombian surgeon and physician

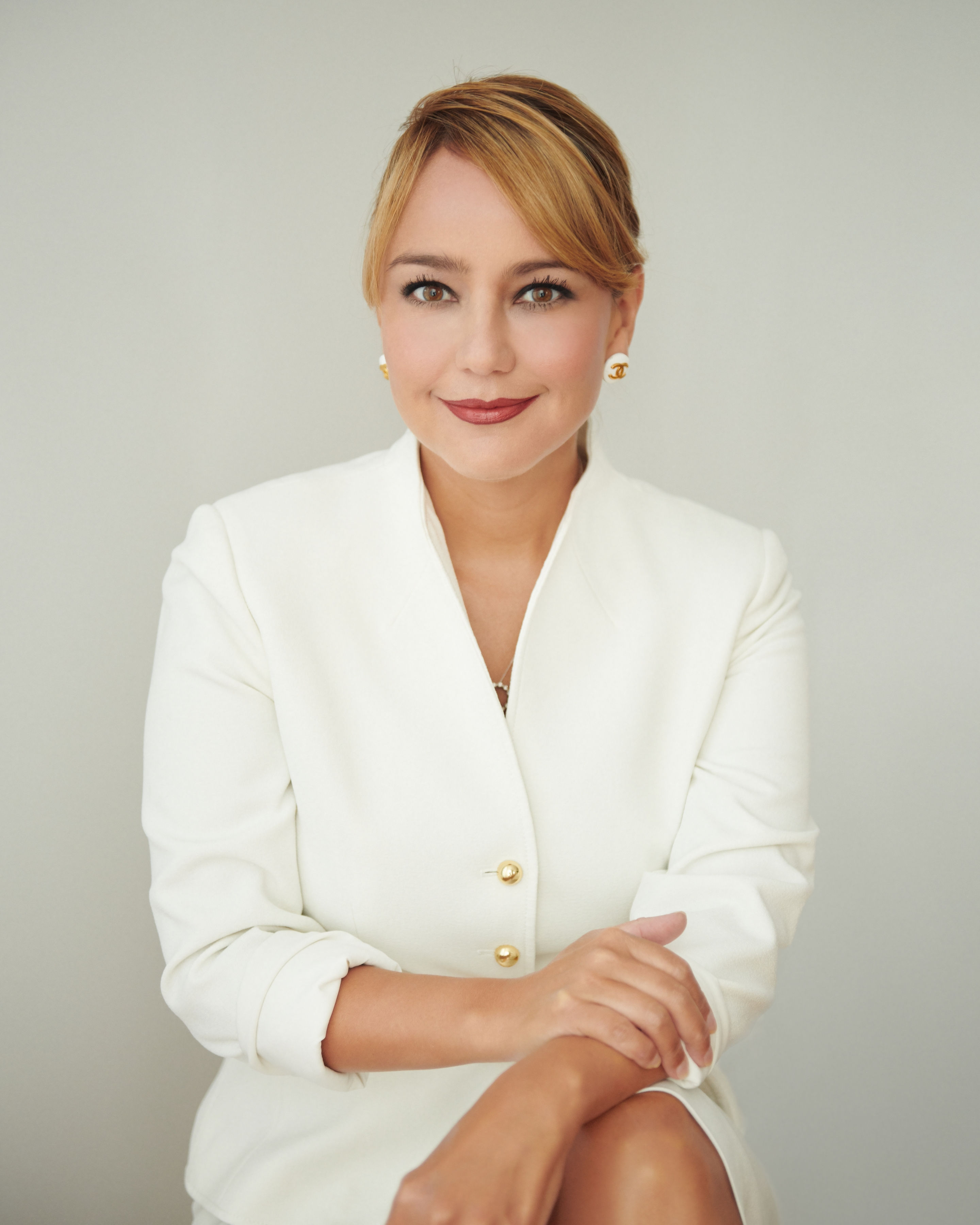
- Ferrada in 2021
- Born: Paula Andrea Ferrada Tolra; April 28, 1977 (age 49); Cali, Colombia
- Education: Universidad del Valle; University of Miami; Beth Israel Deaconess Medical Center; University of Pittsburgh; University of Maryland Medical Center
- Medical career
- Profession: Surgeon, physician, medical educator
- Field: Trauma surgery, acute care surgery, critical care medicine, surgical education
- Institutions: Inova Fairfax Medical Campus; Inova Health System; University of Virginia; Virginia Commonwealth University

Paula Andrea Ferrada Tolra (born April 28, 1977) is a Colombian-born surgeon, trauma surgeon, surgical critical care physician, and medical educator. Her work has focused on trauma care, acute care surgery, surgical critical care, point-of-care ultrasound, and surgical education. She is Chair of the Department of Surgery at Inova Fairfax Medical Campus, Division and System Chief of Trauma and Acute Care Surgery for the Inova Health System, and Medical Director of Perioperative Services for Inova. She is also Professor of Medical Education at the University of Virginia.

Before her medical career, Ferrada worked as a model and television personality in Colombia.

== Early life ==
Ferrada was born in Cali, Colombia. In 1994, she received the title of Miss Belleza Juvenil in Colombia and hosted a local television program, Super Bien. She also appeared in the Colombian comedy O todos en la cama and later worked in modeling and television commercials.

== Education and training ==
Ferrada earned her medical degree from Universidad del Valle in Cali. She then completed a research fellowship at the University of Miami. She completed surgical internship training at the University of Miami's Jackson Memorial Hospital and a surgical residency at Beth Israel Deaconess Medical Center, a teaching hospital of Harvard Medical School.

Ferrada completed a fellowship in surgical critical care at the University of Pittsburgh and a fellowship in acute care surgery at the R Adams Cowley Shock Trauma Center at the University of Maryland Medical Center.

She later completed executive and leadership training through the Executive Program in Advanced Management at the University of Virginia Darden School of Business and the Hedwig van Ameringen Executive Leadership in Academic Medicine program.

== Career ==
Ferrada began her academic surgical career as a clinical instructor at the University of Pittsburgh and the University of Maryland. In 2010, she joined Virginia Commonwealth University (VCU) in the Division of Acute Care Surgical Services. In 2018, she became professor of surgery at the Virginia Commonwealth University School of Medicine.

During her tenure at VCU, Ferrada was director of the Surgical Critical Care Fellowship Program and director of the Surgical Trauma Intensive Care Unit. She also served on the board of Medical College of Virginia Physicians (MCVP). At VCU, she co-led the adoption of a root-cause-analysis approach for weekly Death and Complications conferences.

In 2021, Ferrada joined Inova as Division and System Chief of Trauma and Acute Care Surgery for the Inova Health System. In 2024, she became Medical Director of Perioperative Services at Inova Fairfax Medical Campus. In January 2025, she became Chair of the Department of Surgery at Inova Fairfax Medical Campus.

== Mentorship and professional service ==
Ferrada has held leadership roles in several surgical and trauma organizations. In the American College of Surgeons (ACS), she has served as President of the Virginia Chapter, Chair of the Young Fellows Association, a member of the ACS Clinical Congress Program Committee, and Vice Chair for Verification and Certification for the ACS National Ultrasound Faculty. She has also served as a Governor of the ACS representing Virginia.

Ferrada has been involved with the Eastern Association for the Surgery of Trauma (EAST), where she served on the board of directors, chaired the Mentorship Committee, chaired the Division of Membership, and later became President-Elect. Her work in EAST included mentorship programs for surgeons at different career stages.

Ferrada has also held leadership roles in the Panamerican Trauma Society, including Chair of the Education and Research Committee, Executive Secretary, President-Elect, and President. Through the society, she helped teach trauma and ultrasound courses in Latin America.

In Virginia, Ferrada was appointed by the governor to the Virginia Department of Health Office of Emergency Medical Services as State Trauma Coordinator and later served as chair of the EMS advisory board. She has also held leadership roles in the Association of Women Surgeons, including serving as President of the Virginia Chapter.

Ferrada has supported mentorship programs for women surgeons, early-career surgeons, residents, and medical students. She has created and supported scholarships for international surgical exchange and has participated in initiatives intended to expand leadership opportunities for women and underrepresented groups in surgery.

== Research ==
Ferrada's academic work has focused on trauma resuscitation, surgical critical care, emergency general surgery, ultrasound-guided resuscitation, surgical education, and leadership in acute care surgery. Her publications include clinical studies, reviews, practice guidelines, editorials, and educational articles in trauma and acute care surgery.

One area of Ferrada's research has been the early management of severely injured patients, particularly hemorrhage control and the sequencing of trauma resuscitation. She has written on circulation-first approaches in exsanguinating trauma patients and on decision-making during the initial phase of resuscitation.

Ferrada has also contributed to work on point-of-care ultrasound and echocardiography in trauma and critical care. Her publications and teaching activities have addressed the use of ultrasound to evaluate fluid status, guide resuscitation, and support clinical decision-making in critically ill or injured patients. She has directed ultrasound courses for surgeons and has been involved in ultrasound education through the Panamerican Trauma Society and the American College of Surgeons.

In surgical education, Ferrada has written on physician leadership, early-career academic surgery, psychological safety, and competency-based training in trauma resuscitation. She has also served in educational roles related to surgical critical care training and trauma education.

Ferrada has served as an associate editor of the American Journal of Surgery. She has also served on the editorial boards of the Journal of the American College of Surgeons, Surgery, and the Journal of Trauma and Acute Care Surgery.

== Awards and honors ==
Ferrada has received teaching and mentorship awards from Harvard Medical School and Virginia Commonwealth University. At Harvard Medical School, she received resident teaching recognition while training at Beth Israel Deaconess Medical Center. At VCU School of Medicine, she received the Irby-James Award for Excellence in Clinical Teaching and the Leonard Tow Humanism in Medicine Award, and the Leadership in Graduate Medical Education Award.

She is a Fellow of the American College of Surgeons and a Fellow of the American College of Critical Care Medicine. In 2021, she was inducted as a member of the American College of Surgeons Academy of Master Surgeon Educators. In 2022, she received the Olga Jonasson Distinguished Member Award from the Association of Women Surgeons. She was elected a full member of the American Surgical Association in 2024 and later became an honorary fellow of the Association of Surgeons of Great Britain and Ireland. In 2026, Ferrada was named one of Becker's Hospital Review's 145 patient safety experts to know.
