= Chapelle Sainte-Agathe =

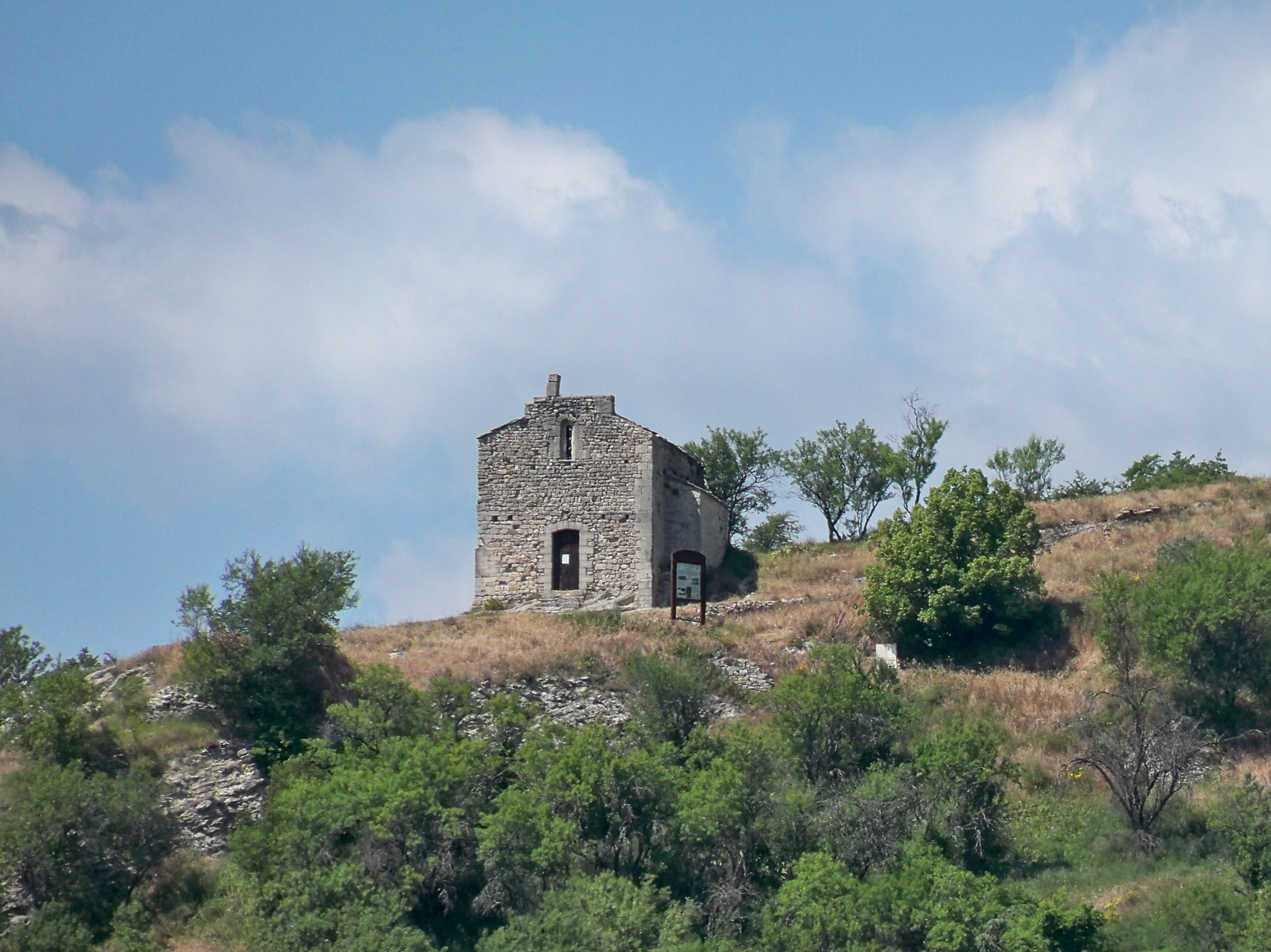
- Chapelle Saint-Agathe
- Chapelle Sainte-Agathe
- 43°54′16″N 5°47′32″E
- Location: Saint Maime
- Country: France
- Denomination: Roman Catholic

History
- Founded: 12th century

Architecture
- Architectural type: church

The Chapelle Sainte-Agathe is a chapel located in Saint-Maime in the French department of Alpes-de-Haute-Provence. It was erected in the 12th century.

== History ==
The Chapelle Sainte-Agathe and the Château de Saint-Maime tower were built in the 12th century. Apart from the remains of a few castle walls, these are the only remains of the castle that was once inhabited by Ramon Berenguer IV, Count of Provence and his wife Beatrice of Savoy.

The chapel is classified as an official Monument historique by a decree of March 4, 1988.

== Architecture ==
Inside the chapel, frescoes of the 12 apostles are barely visible. The adjacent tower is the only octagonal tower in Provence. The tower has recently undergone an extensive renovation with support from the French Fondation du Patrimoine. The chapel offers panoramic views of the Luberon valley including the villages of Dauphin and Mane.d
