= Mocònesi =

Moconesi Meconexi
- Comune
- Comune di Moconesi
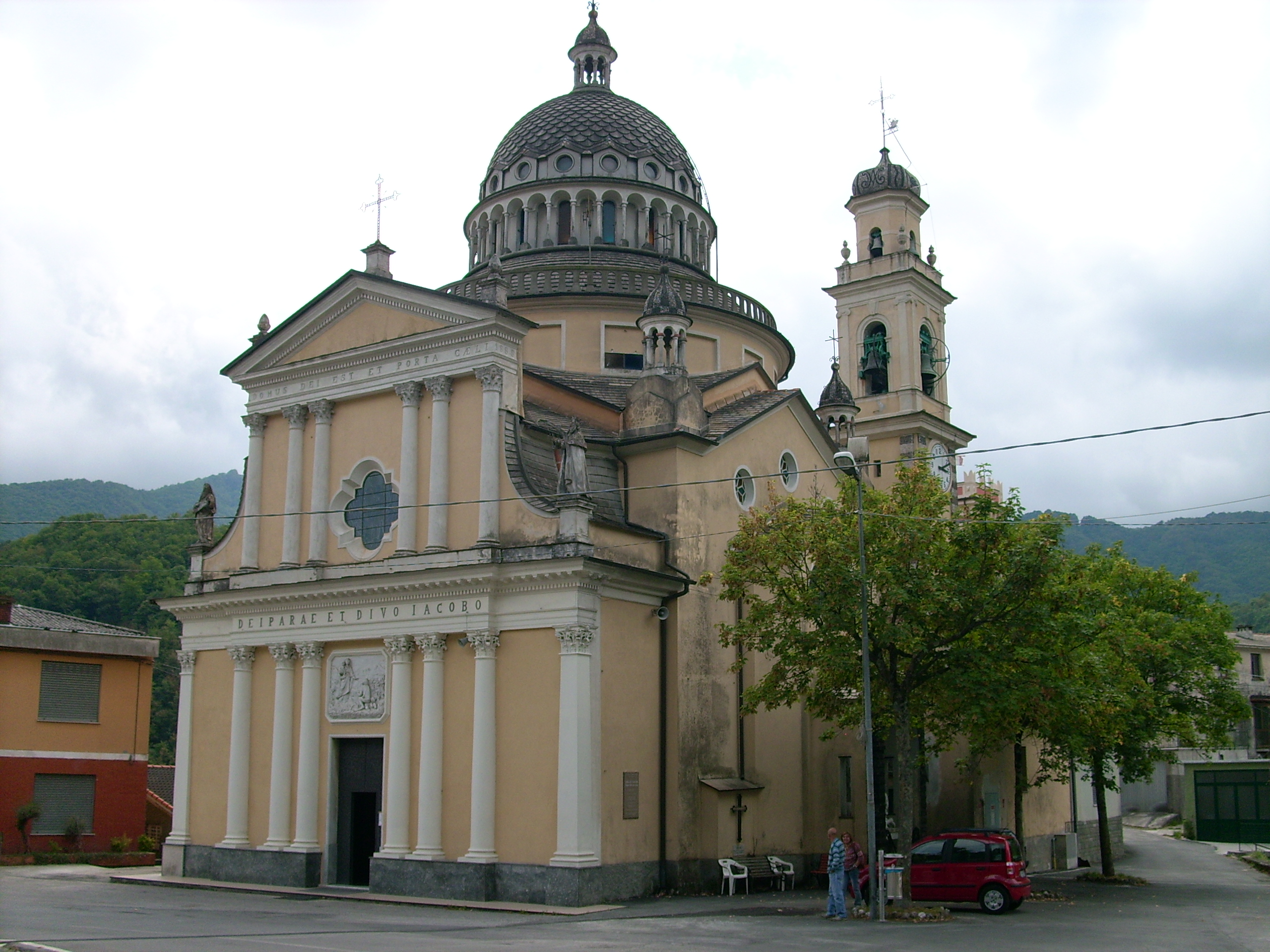
- Church

- Location within Italy Location within Liguria
- Coordinates: 44°25′N 9°12′E
- Country: Italy
- Region: Liguria
- Metropolitan city: Genoa (GE)
- Frazioni: Cornia, Dragonaria, Ferrada (communal seat), Gattorna, Moconesi Alto, Pezzonasca, Santa Brilla, Terrarossa Colombo

Government
  - Mayor: Giovanni Dondero

Area
  - Total: 16.27 km^{2} (6.28 sq mi)
- Elevation: 129 m (423 ft)

Population (31 May 2022)
  - Total: 2,426
  - Density: 149.1/km^{2} (386.2/sq mi)
- Demonym: Moconesini
- Time zone: UTC+1 (CET)
  - Summer (DST): UTC+2 (CEST)
- Postal code: 16047
- Dialing code: 0185
- Website: Official website

Moconesi (Ligurian: Meconexi) is a municipality (comune) in the Metropolitan City of Genoa in the Italian region Liguria. The head-hamlet of Moconesi municipality is the village of Ferrada which is located about 40 kilometres (25 mi) northeast of Genoa and 1 kilometre (0.6 mi) from the house in Terrarossa, reportedly place of birth of Christopher Columbus.

Moconesi would mean "casa di Mocco", the name of an ancient Roman legate found in the bronze tablet of Polcevera, an archeological finding of 1506 recording a sentence of the Roman Senate of 111 BC. This sentence concerned a territorial dispute of families in the Polcevera Valley of Northern Genoa). The actual territories of Ferrada di Moconesi and vicinities were the property of the family Fieschi of Lavagna, before they became property of the Republic of Genoa in 1147. Moconesi was later included in the Captainship of Rapallo and within the French administration during Napoleon Bonaparte occupation of Northern Italy.

Moconesi borders the following municipalities: Cicagna, Favale di Malvaro, Lorsica, Montebruno, Neirone, Torriglia, Tribogna.
