= Marsiglia (disambiguation) =

Marsiglia is the Italian name of the French city of Marseille.

Marsiglia may also refer to:

== Places ==
- Marsiglia (Davagna), an Italian village and hamlet of Davagna, Liguria
- Stadio di Corso Marsiglia, an Italian football stadium in Turin, Piedmont

== People ==
- Guglielmo da Marsiglia (1475–1537), Italian painter of stained glass
- Mickaël Marsiglia (born 1975), French footballer
- Renato Marsiglia (born 1951), retired Brazilian football referee
- René Marsiglia (1959–2016), French football manager
- Vittorio Marsiglia (born 1943), Italian actor who appeared in Paulo Roberto Cotechiño centravanti di sfondamento

== See also ==
- Marseille (disambiguation)
- Massilia (disambiguation)
- Morsiglia, a French municipality in Corsica
