= Saint-Maime =

- Commune
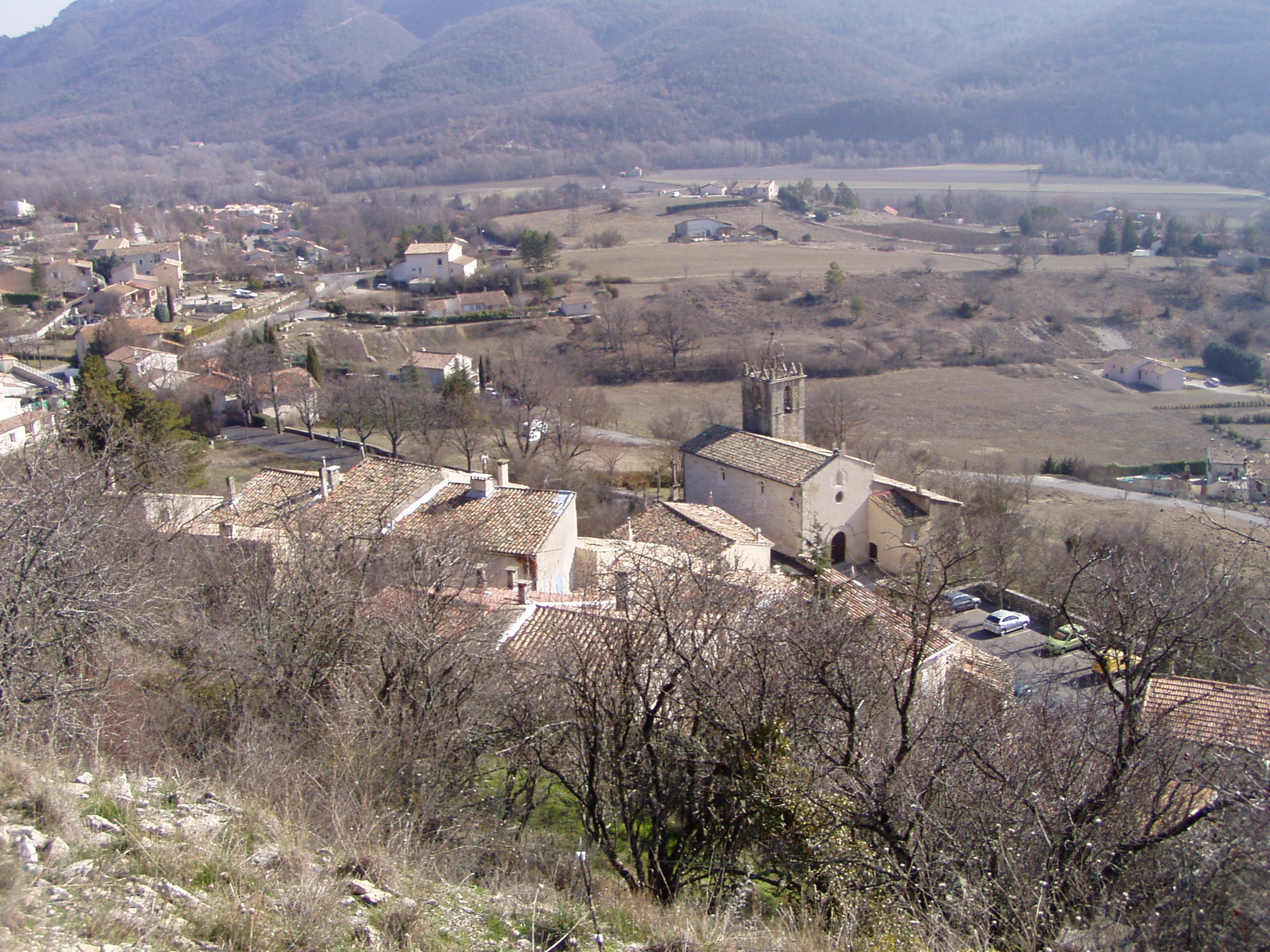
- A general view of the village of Saint-Maime

- Coat of arms
- Location of Saint-Maime
- Location within France Location within Provence-Alpes-Côte d'Azur
- Coordinates: 43°54′17″N 5°47′36″E
- Country: France
- Region: Provence-Alpes-Côte d'Azur
- Department: Alpes-de-Haute-Provence
- Arrondissement: Forcalquier
- Canton: Reillanne
- Intercommunality: Haute-Provence-Pays de Banon

Government
  - Mayor (2026–32): Jacques Bouffier
- Area^{1}: 7.51 km^{2} (2.90 sq mi)
- Elevation: 381 m (1,250 ft)
- Highest elevation: 772 m (2,533 ft)
- Lowest elevation: 351 m (1,152 ft)
- Population (2023): 923
  - Density: 123/km^{2} (318/sq mi)
- Time zone: UTC+01:00 (CET)
  - Summer (DST): UTC+02:00 (CEST)
- INSEE/Postal code: 04188 /04300
- ^{1} French Land Register data, which excludes lakes, ponds, glaciers > 1 km^{2} (0.386 sq mi or 247 acres) and river estuaries.

Saint-Maime (French pronunciation: [sɛ̃ mɛm]; Occitan: Sant Maime) is a commune in the Alpes-de-Haute-Provence department in southeastern France. It is located in the Luberon national park and is home to the 12th century chapel Chapelle Sainte-Agathe.

== Geography ==
The village is located on a hill at an altitude of 381 metres at the eastern extremity of the Luberon national park. It is adjacent to the village of Dauphin and located halfway between Manosque and Forcalquier.

== History ==
The earliest recorded population in Saint Maime were the Gaulish tribe known as the Sogiontiques who were spread through the southern Alps and had Sequester (modern day Sisteron) as their major city. The tribe was conquered by Roman armies led by Augustus in 14 BCE. The battle is inscribed on the Tropaeum Alpium (Victory Monument of the Alps), a tribute to Roman war victories built by Augustus in 6 BCE outside of modern-day Monaco. The only traces of habitation from this period is a necropolis that was discovered in the village that held more than 1500 skeletons.

The village was the location of a castle that was owned by Ramon Berenguer IV, Count of Provence and his wife Beatrice of Savoy in the 12th century. Historians are divided as whether or not Ramon Berenguer IV ever spent time in this castle or whether it was merely part of the family property, but certain academics insist that at the very least Beatrice used the castle as a residence. The family's four daughters - Margaret of Provence, Eleanor of Provence, Sanchia of Provence, and Beatrice of Provence- each became queens. Margaret of Provence became the wife of King Louis IX of France, Eleanor of Provence married King Henry III of England, Sanchia of Provence married Richard, 1st Earl of Cornwall who became King of Germany, and Beatrice of Provence married King Charles I of Sicily. Because of the traditional connection to these four women, there are multiple references to the 'Quatre Reinese' (Four Queens) in the village of Saint Maime and the local restaurant and hotel both carry that name. Today, only the Chapelle Sainte-Agathe and one of the castle's towers remains. The tower is unique in Provence because of its octagonal structure. The chapel is classified as an official Monument historique by a decree of March 4, 1988.

== Population ==
Historical population
Year	Pop.	±% p.a.
1968	374	—
1975	280	−4.05%
1982	417	+5.85%
1990	528	+2.99%
1999	661	+2.53%
2007	816	+2.67%
2012	812	−0.10%
2017	860	+1.16%
2023	923	+1.19%
Source: INSEE

== Twin towns — sister cities ==
Saint-Maime is twinned with:

- Fontanigorda, Italy (1997)

== See also ==
- Luberon
- Communes of the Alpes-de-Haute-Provence department
