= Marseille (disambiguation) =

Marseille is the second-largest city of France.

Marseille or Marseilles may also refer to:

== Places ==
=== France ===
- Marseille-en-Beauvaisis, in the Oise department
- Marseilles-lès-Aubigny, in the Cher department

=== South Africa ===
- Marseilles, Free State

=== United States ===
- Marseilles, Illinois, United States
- Marseilles, Ohio, United States
- Marseilles Township, Wyandot County, Ohio, United States

== People ==
- Hans-Joachim Marseille, (1919–1942), German flying ace of the Second World War
- Jacques Marseille, French historian, economist, and universal basic income advocate
- Raymond of Marseille, a medieval astronomer

== Art, entertainment, and media ==
=== Films ===
- Marseille (2004 film), a 2004 German film
- Marseille (2016 film), a 2016 French film
- Marseille trilogy, a series of French films by Marcel Pagnol comprising: Marius (1931), Fanny (1932), and César (1936)

=== Music ===
==== Groups ====
- Marseille (band), a band from Liverpool, England
- Hey Marseilles, a band from Seattle, WA

==== Songs ====
- "La Marseillaise", the French national anthem
- "Marseilles", a popular song by Australian band The Angels

=== Other arts, entertainment, and media ===
- Marseilles (play), a 1930 play by Sidney Howard
- Marseille (TV series), a 2016 Netflix television series
- Hanna-Justina Marseille, a fictional character from the anime/manga Strike Witches

== Sports ==
- Olympique de Marseille, a French professional football (soccer) team

== See also ==
- Marsiglia (disambiguation)
- Massilia (disambiguation)
