= Davagna =

Davagna Dägna
- Comune
- Comune di Davagna
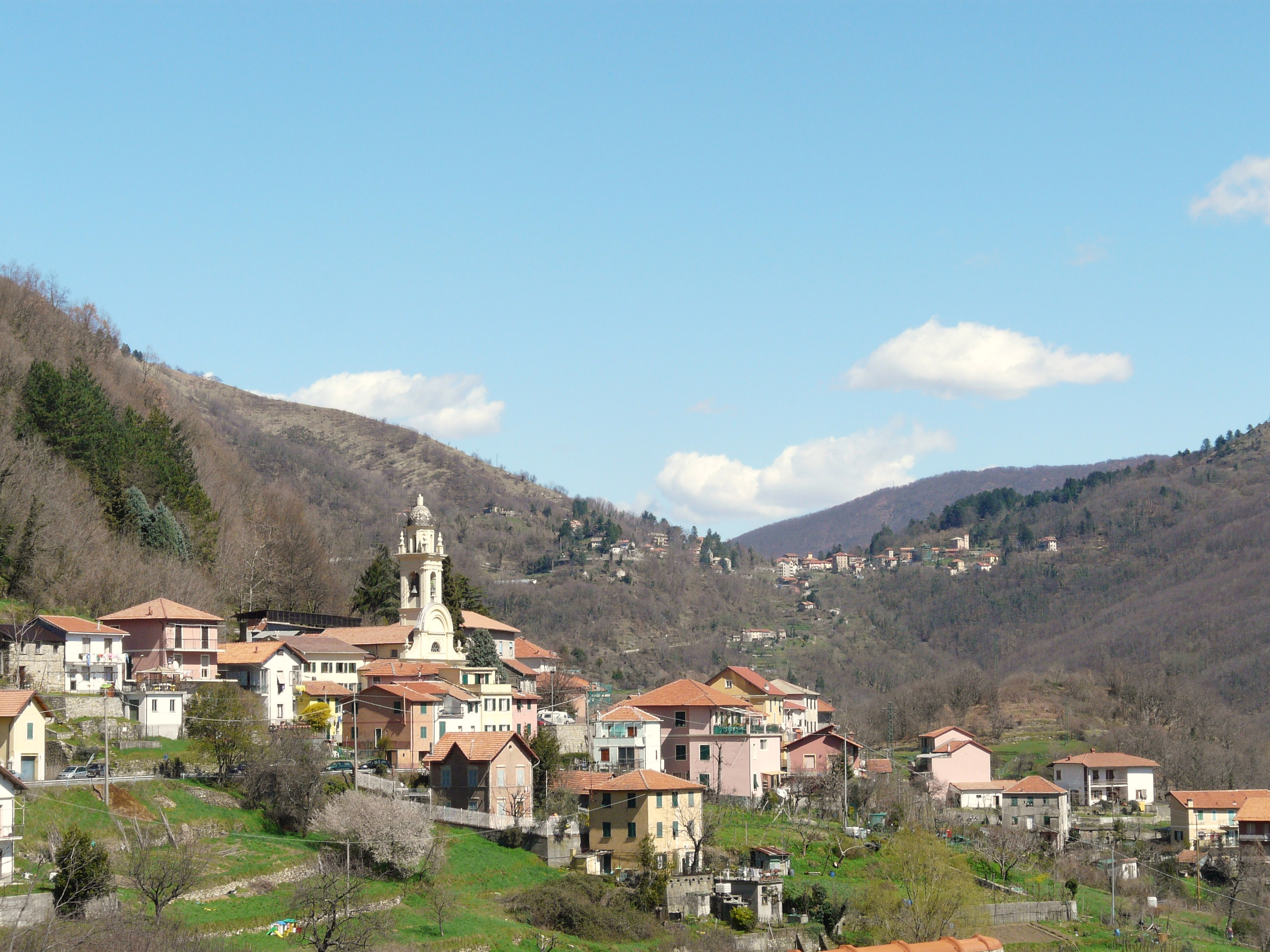
- Davagna

- Davagna within the Metropolitan City of Genoa

- Location within Italy Location within Liguria
- Coordinates: 44°28′N 9°5′E
- Country: Italy
- Region: Liguria
- Metropolitan city: Genoa (GE)
- Frazioni: Canate, Capenardo, Cavassolo, Calvari, La Presa, Maggiolo, Marsiglia, Meco, Moranego, Paravagna, Piancarnese, Pie' di Rosso, Rosso, Scoffera, Sella, Sottana, Sottocolle, Villamezzana

Government
  - Mayor: Romildo Malatesta

Area
  - Total: 20.53 km^{2} (7.93 sq mi)
- Elevation: 516 m (1,693 ft)

Population (30 June 2017)
  - Total: 1,899
  - Density: 92.50/km^{2} (239.6/sq mi)
- Demonym: Davagnini
- Time zone: UTC+1 (CET)
  - Summer (DST): UTC+2 (CEST)
- Postal code: 16022
- Dialing code: 010
- Website: Official website

Davagna (Ligurian: Dägna) is a comune (municipality) in the Metropolitan City of Genoa in the Italian region Liguria, located about 13 kilometres (8 mi) northeast of Genoa.

The municipality of Davagna borders the following municipalities: Bargagli, Genoa, Lumarzo, Montoggio and Torriglia.
