= Marsiglia, Davagna =

Marsiglia
- Frazione
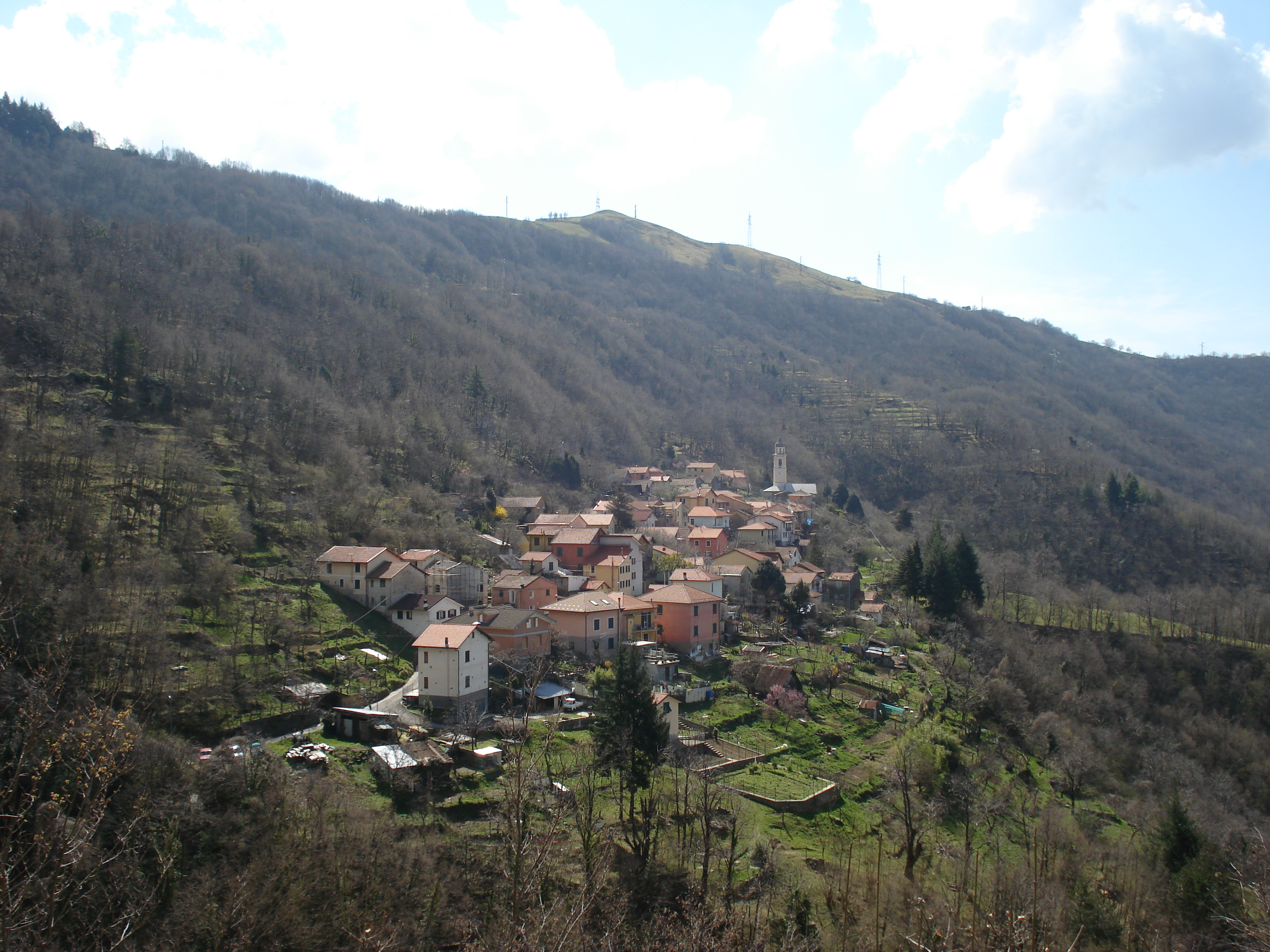

- Location of Marsiglia in Italy
- Coordinates: 44°27′15″N 9°03′53.01″E
- Country: Italy
- Region: Liguria
- Province: Genoa (GE)
- Comune: Davagna
- Elevation: 553 m (1,814 ft)

Population (2009)
  - Total: 55
- Demonym: Marsigliesi
- Time zone: UTC+1 (CET)
  - Summer (DST): UTC+2 (CEST)
- Postal code: 16022
- Dialing code: (+39) 010

Marsiglia is an Italian village and hamlet (frazione) of the municipality of Davagna in the Province of Genoa, Liguria. As of 2009 its population was of 55.

== History ==
As for a local legend, the village was founded by some people from the French city of Marseille, that in Italian is spoken Marsiglia. The village church, dedicated to the patron John the Baptist, was first mentioned in a church document of 1213.

== Geography ==
Marsiglia is part of the municipal subdivision of Calvari, that includes the nearby villages of Calvari, Canate and Cavassolo. It is a hill village located upon the Bisagno river valley, 8 kilometres (5 mi) from Davagna, 14 kilometres (9 mi) from Bargagli and 20 kilometres (12 mi) from the center of Genoa.

== Gallery ==
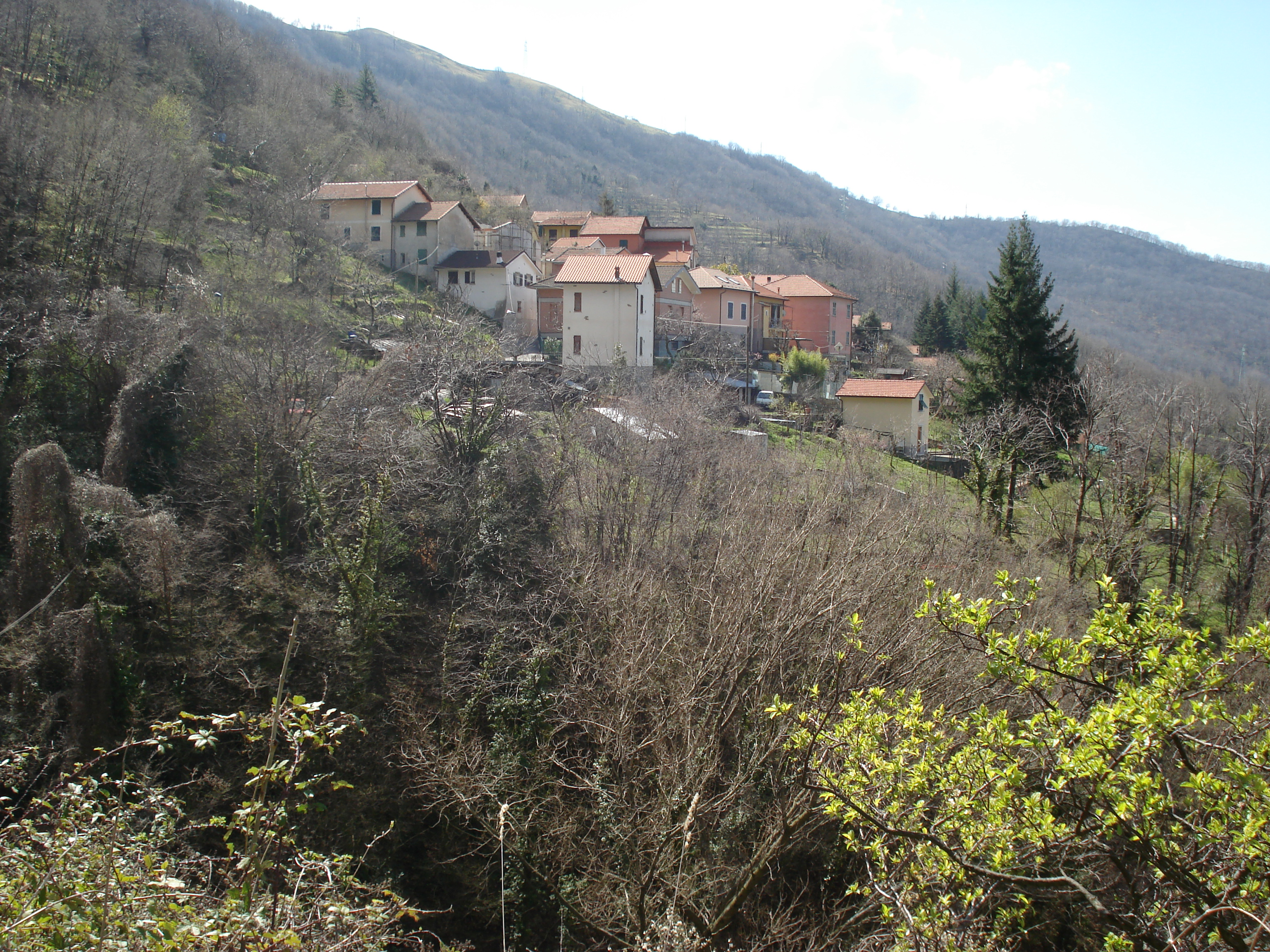
View (1)

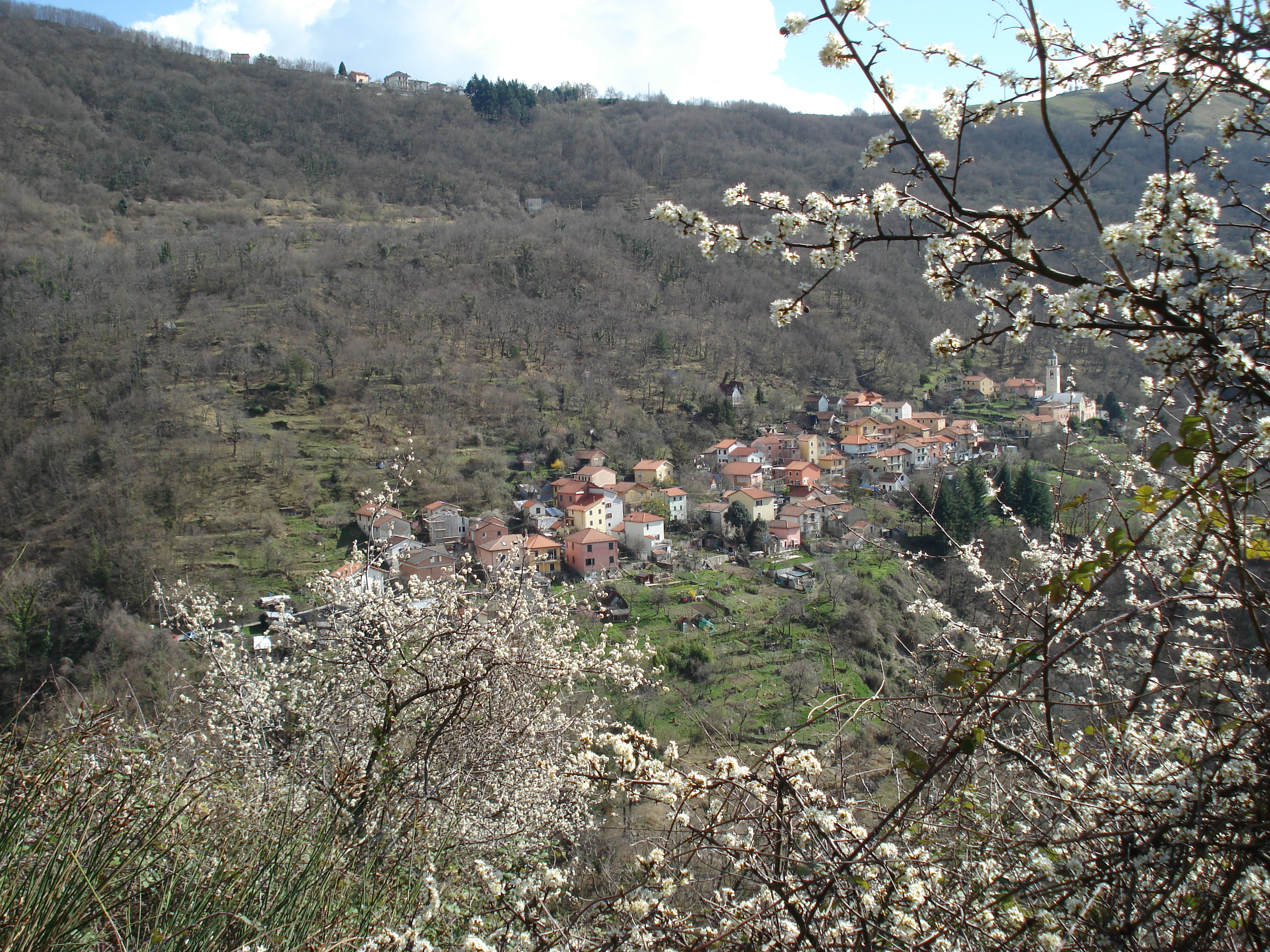
View (2)

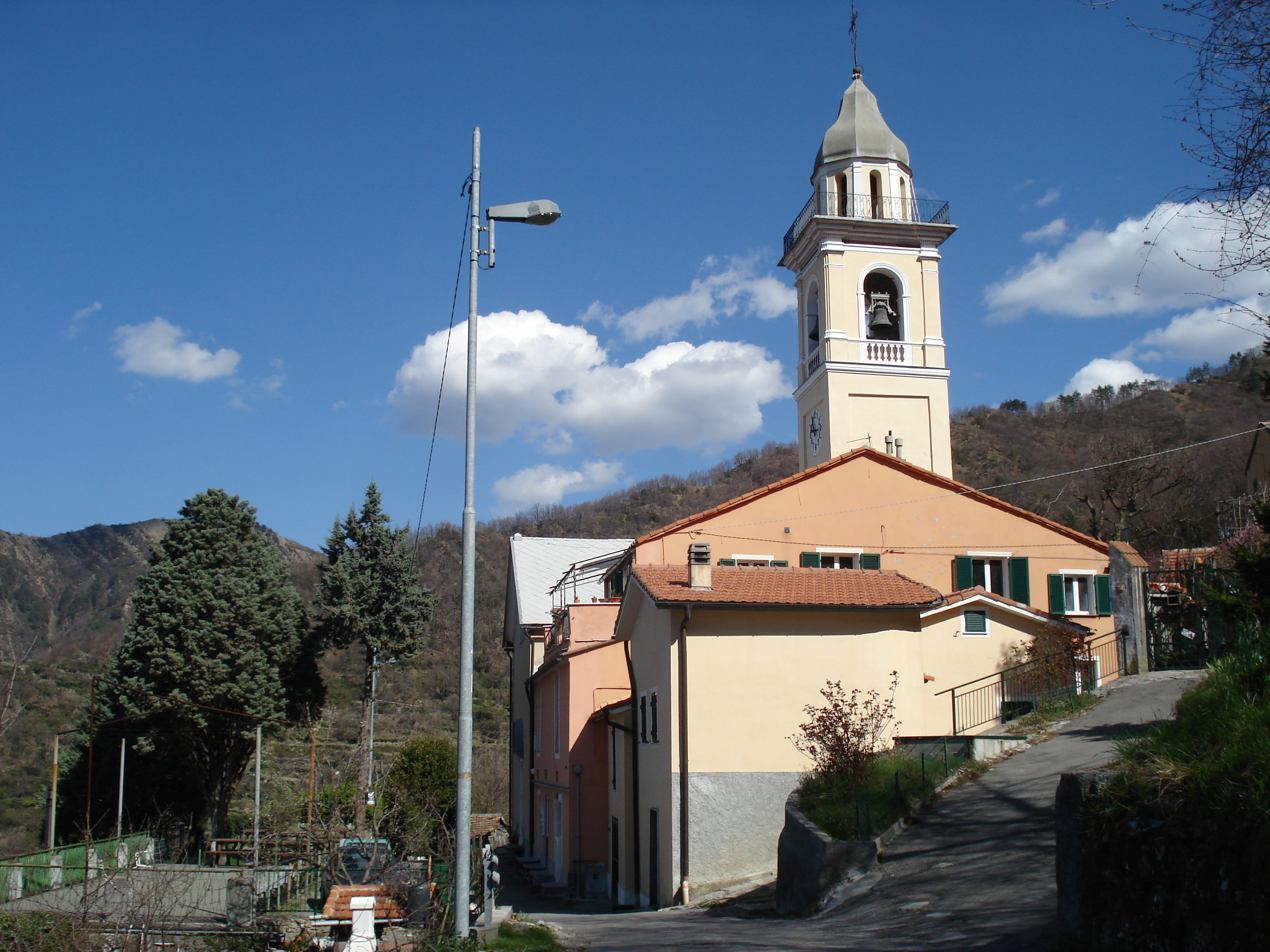
St. John the Baptist church
