= Favale di Malvaro =

- Comune
- Comune di Favale di Malvaro
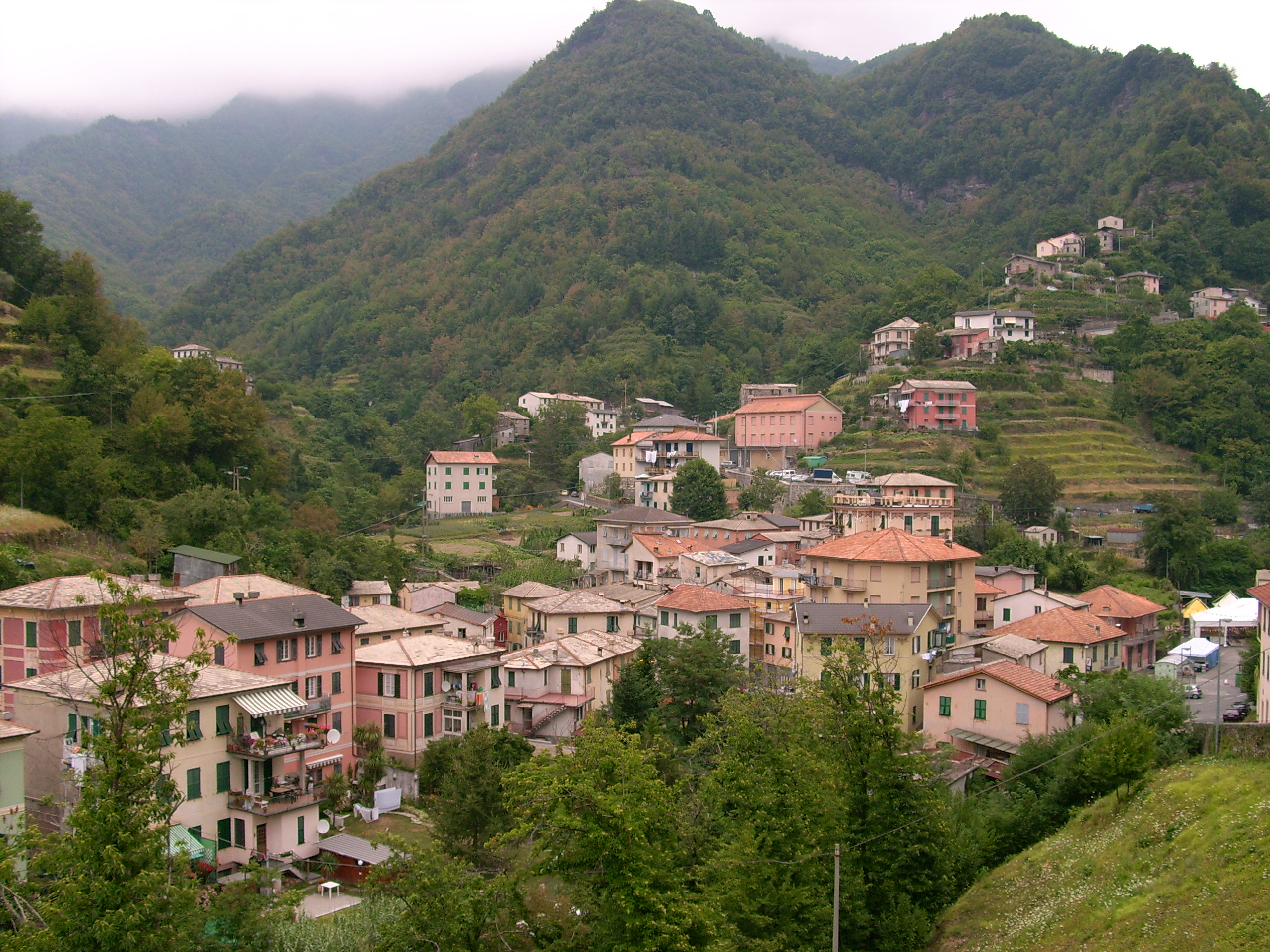
- Favale di Malvaro

- Coat of arms

- Location within Italy Location within Liguria
- Coordinates: 44°27′N 9°16′E
- Country: Italy
- Region: Liguria
- Province: Genoa (GE)
- Frazioni: Monteghirfo

Government
  - Mayor: Ubaldo Crino

Area
  - Total: 16.62 km^{2} (6.42 sq mi)
- Elevation: 300 m (980 ft)

Population (31 July 2017)
  - Total: 470
  - Density: 28/km^{2} (73/sq mi)
- Demonym: Favalesi
- Time zone: UTC+1 (CET)
  - Summer (DST): UTC+2 (CEST)
- Postal code: 16040
- Dialing code: 0185
- Website: Official website

Favale di Malvaro (Ligurian: O Favâ) is a comune (municipality) in the Metropolitan City of Genoa in the Italian region Liguria, located about 25 kilometres (16 mi) east of Genoa.

Favale di Malvaro borders the following municipalities: Lorsica, Mocònesi, Neirone, Rezzoaglio.
