= Neirone =

Neirone Neion
- Comune
- Comune di Neirone
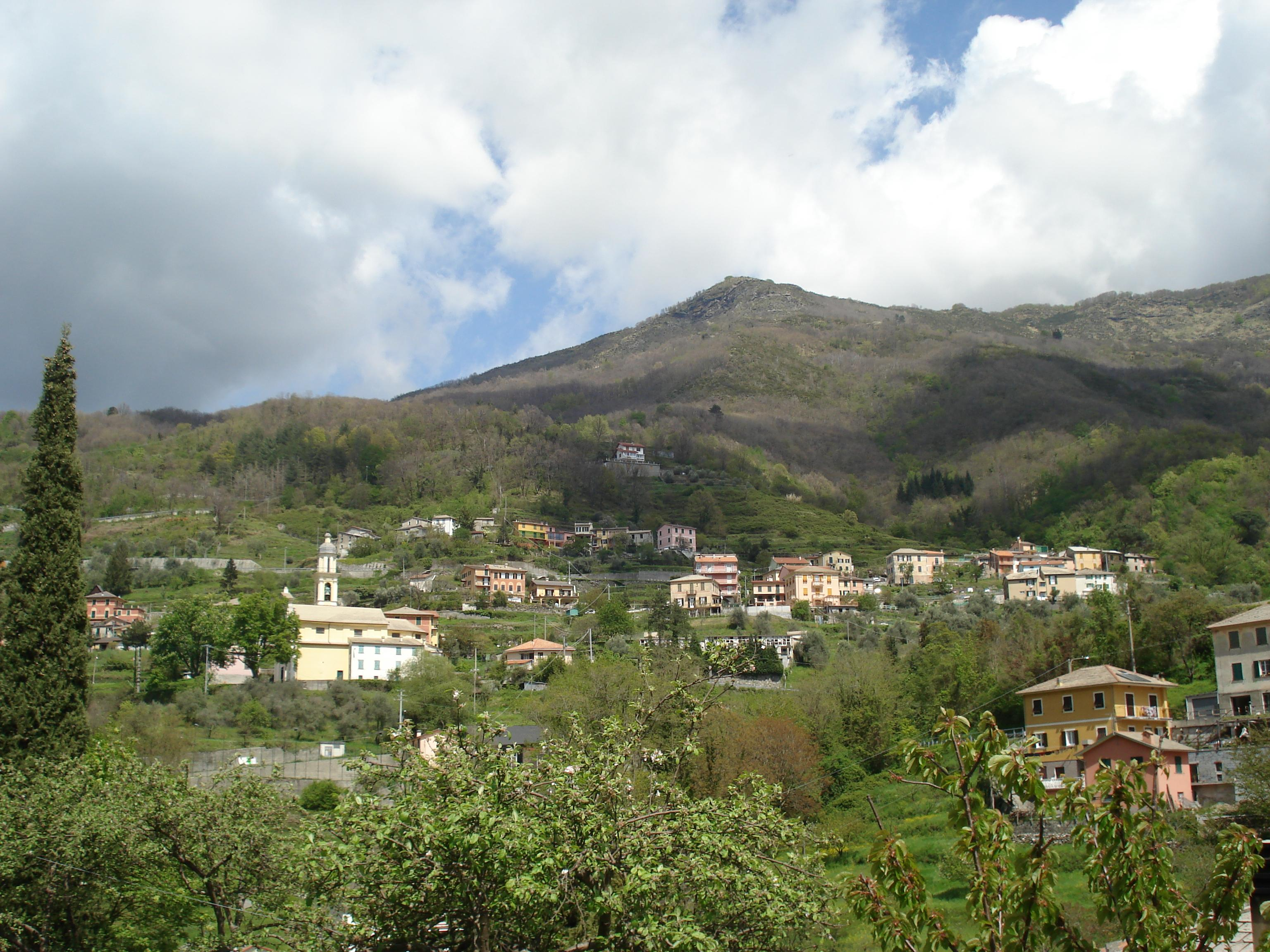
- Neirone

- Location within Italy Location within Liguria
- Coordinates: 44°27′N 9°12′E
- Country: Italy
- Region: Liguria
- Metropolitan city: Genoa (GE)
- Frazioni: Acqua di Ognio, Corsiglia, Lezzaruole, Ognio, Roccatagliata, San Marco D'Urri

Government
  - Mayor: Stefano Sudermania

Area
  - Total: 30.24 km^{2} (11.68 sq mi)
- Elevation: 342 m (1,122 ft)

Population (30 November 2017)
  - Total: 845
  - Density: 27.9/km^{2} (72.4/sq mi)
- Demonym: Neironesi
- Time zone: UTC+1 (CET)
  - Summer (DST): UTC+2 (CEST)
- Postal code: 16040
- Dialing code: 0185
- Website: Official website

Neirone (Ligurian: Neion) is a comune (municipality) in the Metropolitan City of Genoa in the Italian region Liguria, located about 20 kilometres (12 mi) east of Genoa.

Neirone borders the following municipalities: Favale di Malvaro, Lorsica, Lumarzo, Mocònesi, Torriglia, Tribogna, Uscio.
