= Montebruno =

Montebruno Montebrun
- Comune
- Comune di Montebruno
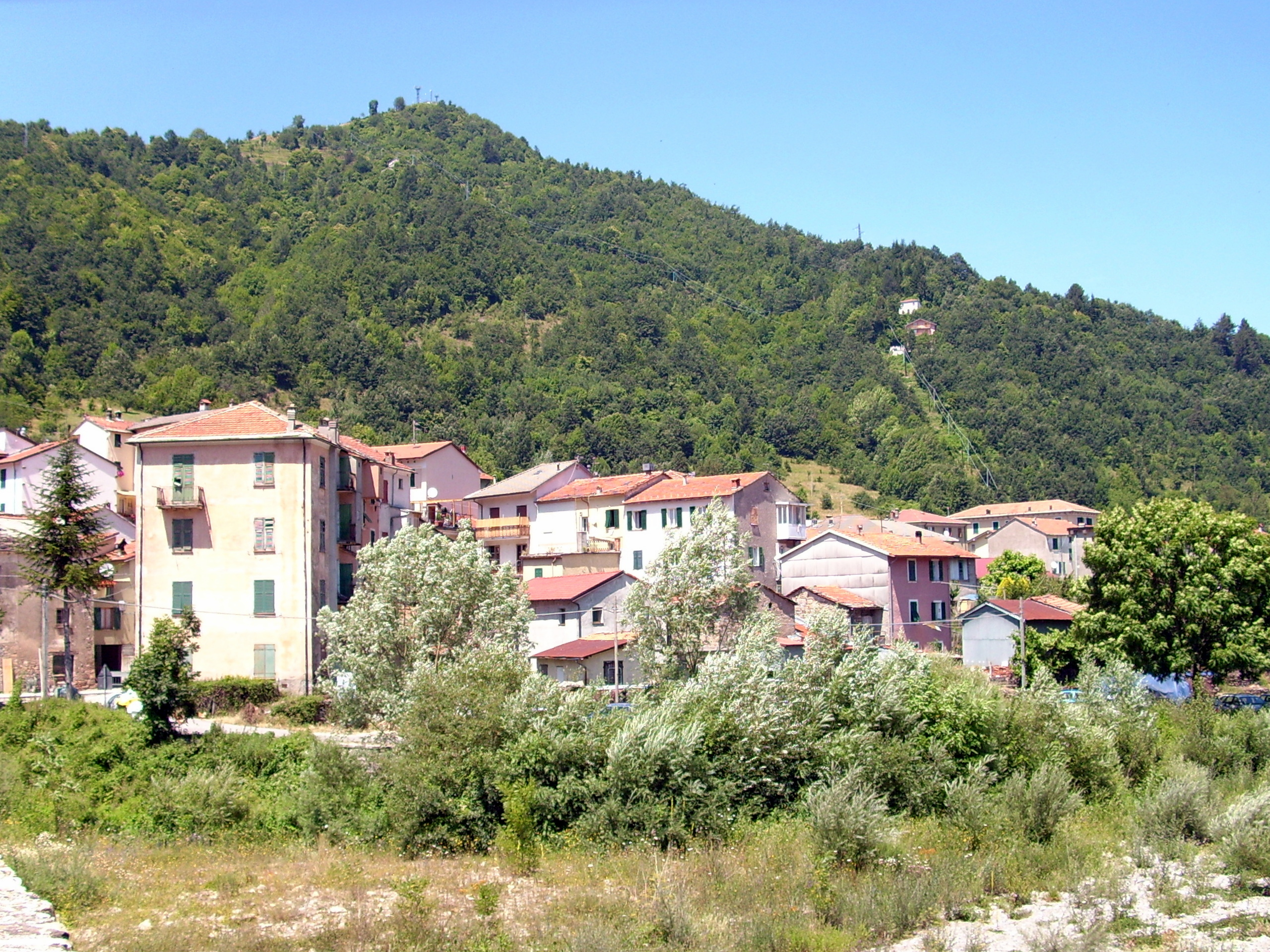

- Coat of arms

- Location within Italy Location within Liguria
- Coordinates: 44°32′N 9°15′E
- Country: Italy
- Region: Liguria
- Metropolitan city: Genoa (GE)
- Frazioni: Pianazzo, Connio di Mezzo, One, Croso, Lunga, Sottoripa, Seppioni, Tartogni, Ca’ de Pipetta, Ravinello, Cassinetta, Ca’ Rossa, Pian della ca', Cason da Basso, Caprili, Zeppado, Segli, Viazzale, Pian de Giane’, Scabbie, Libbie, Rocca, Pian della Felina

Government
  - Mayor: Mirko Bardini

Area
  - Total: 17.68 km^{2} (6.83 sq mi)
- Elevation: 655 m (2,149 ft)

Population (31 May 2022)
  - Total: 210
  - Density: 12/km^{2} (31/sq mi)
- Demonym: Montebrunesi
- Time zone: UTC+1 (CET)
  - Summer (DST): UTC+2 (CEST)
- Postal code: 16025
- Dialing code: 010
- Website: Official website

Montebruno (Ligurian: Montebrun) is a comune (municipality) in the Metropolitan City of Genoa in the Italian region Liguria, located about 30 kilometres (19 mi) northeast of Genoa.

Montebruno borders the following municipalities: Fascia, Fontanigorda, Lorsica, Mocònesi, Rezzoaglio, Rondanina, Torriglia.

== See also ==
- Parco naturale regionale dell'Antola
