= Tribogna =

Tribogna Tribeugna
- Comune
- Comune di Tribogna
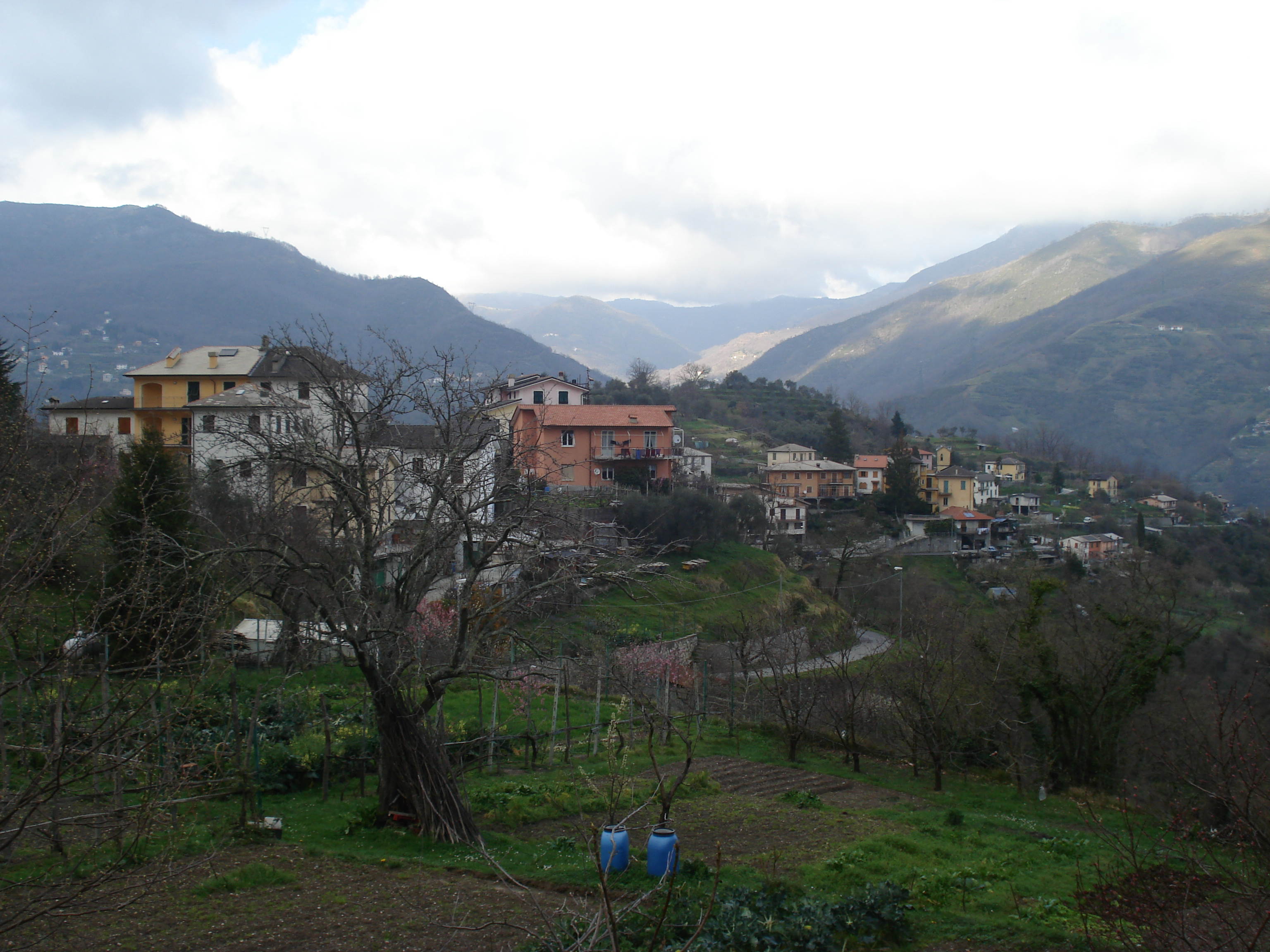
- Tribogna

- Location within Italy Location within Liguria
- Coordinates: 44°25′N 9°12′E
- Country: Italy
- Region: Liguria
- Metropolitan city: Genoa (GE)
- Frazioni: Garbarini, Cassanesi, Piandeipreti, Aveno, Bassi

Government
  - Mayor: Marina Garbarino

Area
  - Total: 7.14 km^{2} (2.76 sq mi)
- Elevation: 330 m (1,080 ft)

Population (31 December 2015)
  - Total: 614
  - Density: 86.0/km^{2} (223/sq mi)
- Demonym: Tribognini
- Time zone: UTC+1 (CET)
  - Summer (DST): UTC+2 (CEST)
- Postal code: 16030
- Dialing code: 0185
- Patron saint: St. Martin of Tours
- Saint day: November 11
- Website: Official website

Tribogna (Ligurian: Tribeugna) is a comune (municipality) in the Metropolitan City of Genoa in the Italian region Liguria, located about 33 kilometres (21 mi) east of Genoa.

Tribogna borders the following municipalities: Avegno, Cicagna, Mocònesi, Neirone, Rapallo, Uscio.
