= Inova Alexandria Hospital =

Hospital in Virginia, US

- Inova Health System

Geography
- Location: 4320 Seminary Road; Alexandria, Virginia 22304, Washington Metropolitan Area, Virginia, United States
- Coordinates: 38.8223°N 77.1053°W

Services
- Beds: 318

History
- Founded: 1872

Links
- Website: www.inova.org/iah
- Lists: Hospitals in Virginia

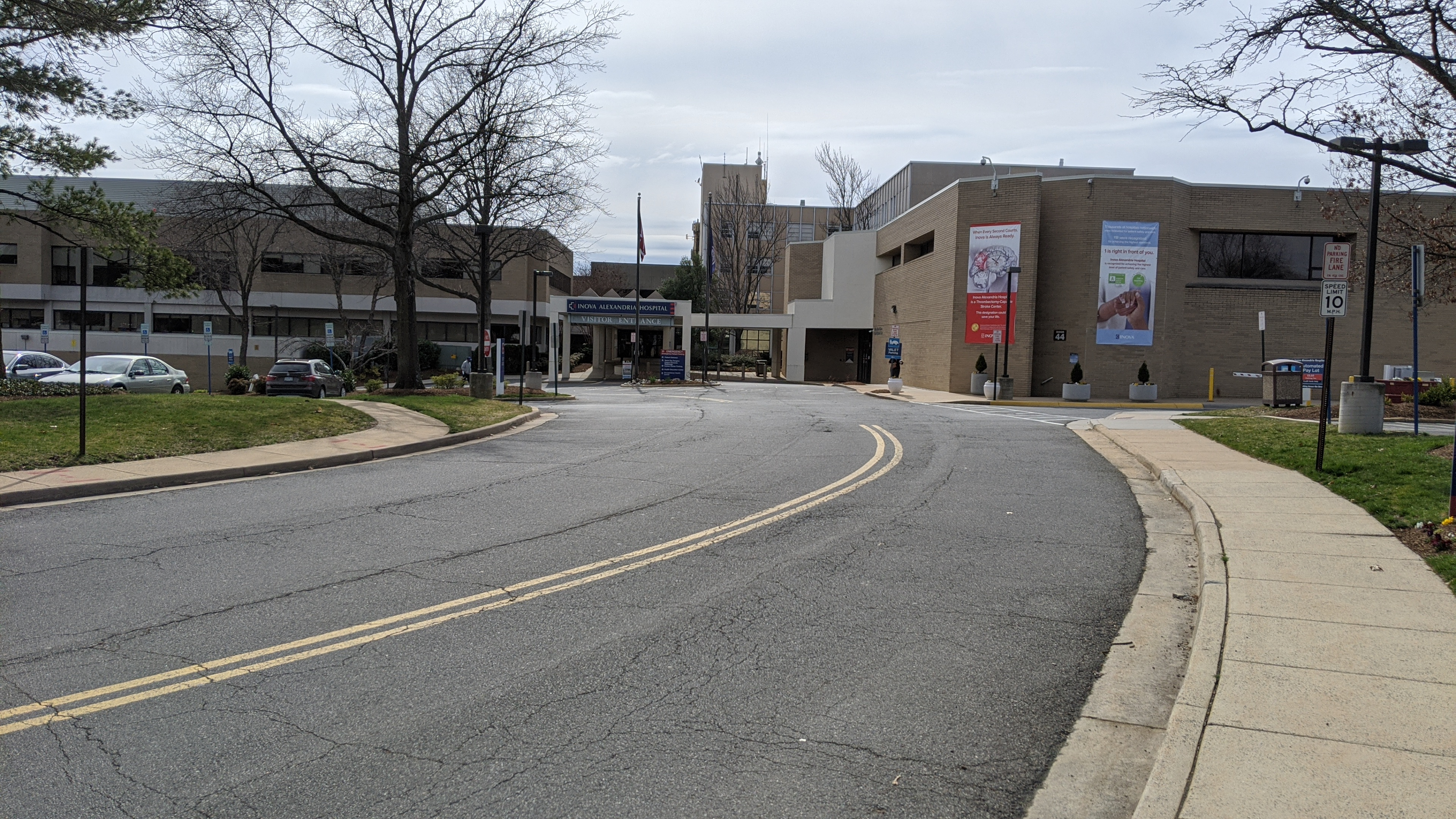
Inova Alexandria hospital

Inova Alexandria Hospital is a not-for-profit hospital in Alexandria, Virginia, United States. Founded in 1872 as the Alexandria Infirmary, it became part of Northern Virginia's Inova Health System in 1997. The hospital is notable for its early contributions in the field of emergency medicine, introducing a 24-hour-a-day emergency department staffed by physicians that has since become the model for emergency care in the United States.

== History ==
=== Early years: The Alexandria Infirmary ===
The hospital's history dates to the 1872 founding of the Alexandria Infirmary by a group of local women led by Julia Johns, whose father was the bishop of the Episcopal Church Diocese of Virginia, John Johns. A sailor had arrived at the port of Alexandria with typhoid fever, sparking fears of an epidemic, but there was no place to quarantine or treat those with the disease. The infirmary opened in early 1873 at the corner of Duke Street and South Fairfax Street in a townhouse owned by Johns's father. It would move several times in its early decades, occupying multiple facilities within the area now known as Old Town Alexandria. In 1894, the infirmary opened a nursing school, the first in Northern Virginia.

In 1902, the infirmary changed its name to Alexandria Hospital. In 1917, it moved to another new location at the corner of Duke and Washington Streets, where it would remain until the opening of its current campus on Seminary Road, in Alexandria's West End area. The hospital broke ground on the new facility in 1959, and officially opened it in 1962; Vice President of the United States Lyndon Johnson spoke at the opening ceremony. The hospital transitioned its various units to Seminary Road in phases from 1962 until the Duke Street site finally closed in 1974.

=== Development of emergency medicine ===
As the 1960s began, a group of physicians at Alexandria Hospital played a pivotal role in creating the modern medical specialty of emergency medicine. Before this time, hospital emergency departments (EDs) (also called emergency rooms (ERs)) were generally staffed by physicians on staff at the hospital on a rotating basis, among them family physicians, general surgeons, internists, and a variety of other specialists. In many smaller emergency departments, nurses would triage patients and physicians would be called in based on the type of injury or illness.

In 1961, an Alexandria Hospital general practice physician, Dr. James Mills, recognized that visits to the hospital's emergency department had rapidly increased while staffing had failed to keep pace, since much of the medical staff did not want to serve in the ED. Dissatisfied with his own general practice, Mills recruited three other physicians to work full-time in the emergency department rather than on rotation; the four became "the first group of American doctors to engage in full-time emergency practice." This approach became known as the “Alexandria Plan" and quickly became a model for other hospitals around the country. By 1968, the specialty was established enough to form the American College of Emergency Physicians, of which Mills served as the second president.

=== Merger with Inova Health System ===
By the 1990s, many patients were covered by health insurance plans that provided larger hospital groups with advantages over smaller independent facilities, which led to many mergers and consolidations in the industry. Alexandria Hospital, though still financially sound at the time, began considering merger options, including both not-for-profit and for-profit partners.

Ultimately, the hospital decided in 1996 to merge with its Fairfax County-based competitor Inova Health System, which was the largest not-for-profit hospital network in Virginia at the time. In addition to concerns about insurance providers, the hospitals' leaders said they expected to save money by avoiding duplication of services. Upon the merger in 1997, the hospital adopted its current name of Inova Alexandria Hospital, and remains a nonprofit organization.

In 2024, construction broke ground for a 1.1 million square-foot project to house the relocated 569,000 square-foot hospital center. At the time of ground breaking, the Alexandria Hospital was housed in the same facility it had been since it opened in 1962.
