= Lorsica =

Lorsica Lorsega
- Comune
- Comune di Lorsica
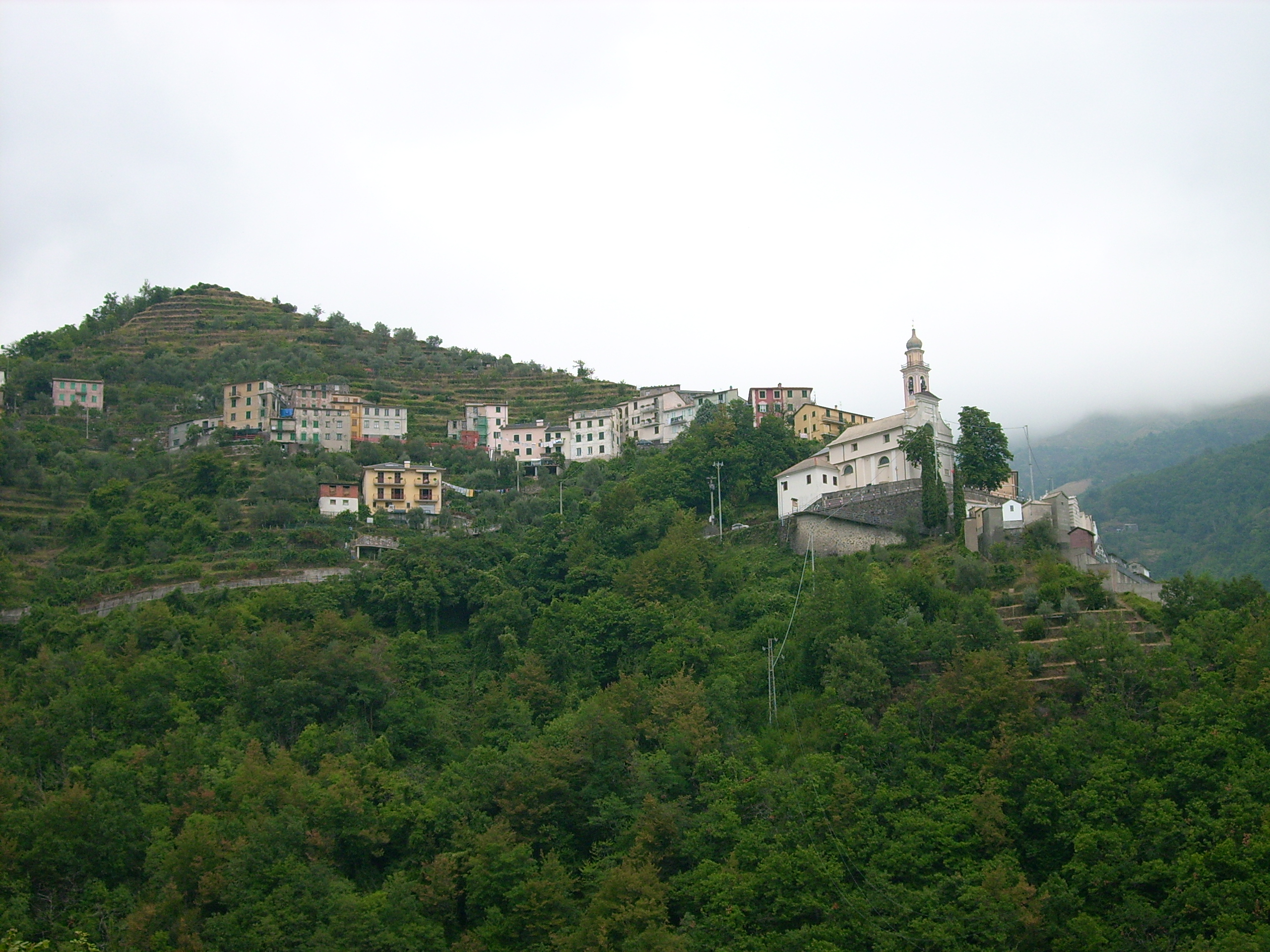
- Lorsica

- Coat of arms

- Location within Italy Location within Liguria
- Coordinates: 44°26′N 9°17′E
- Country: Italy
- Region: Liguria
- Metropolitan city: Genoa (GE)
- Frazioni: Acqua di Sopra, Barbagelata, Castagneto, Figarolo (communal seat), Monteghirfo, Verzi

Government
  - Mayor: Aulo De Ferrari

Area
  - Total: 17.72 km^{2} (6.84 sq mi)
- Elevation: 383 m (1,257 ft)

Population (30 September 2017)
  - Total: 438
  - Density: 24.7/km^{2} (64.0/sq mi)
- Demonym: Lorsicesi
- Time zone: UTC+1 (CET)
  - Summer (DST): UTC+2 (CEST)
- Postal code: 16045
- Dialing code: 0185
- Website: Official website

Lorsica (Ligurian: Lorsega) is a comune (municipality) in the Metropolitan City of Genoa in the Italian region Liguria, located about 30 kilometres (19 mi) east of Genoa.

Lorsica borders the following municipalities: Cicagna, Favale di Malvaro, Mocònesi, Montebruno, Neirone, Orero, Rezzoaglio, Torriglia.
