= Avegno, Liguria =

Avegno
- Comune
- Comune di Avegno
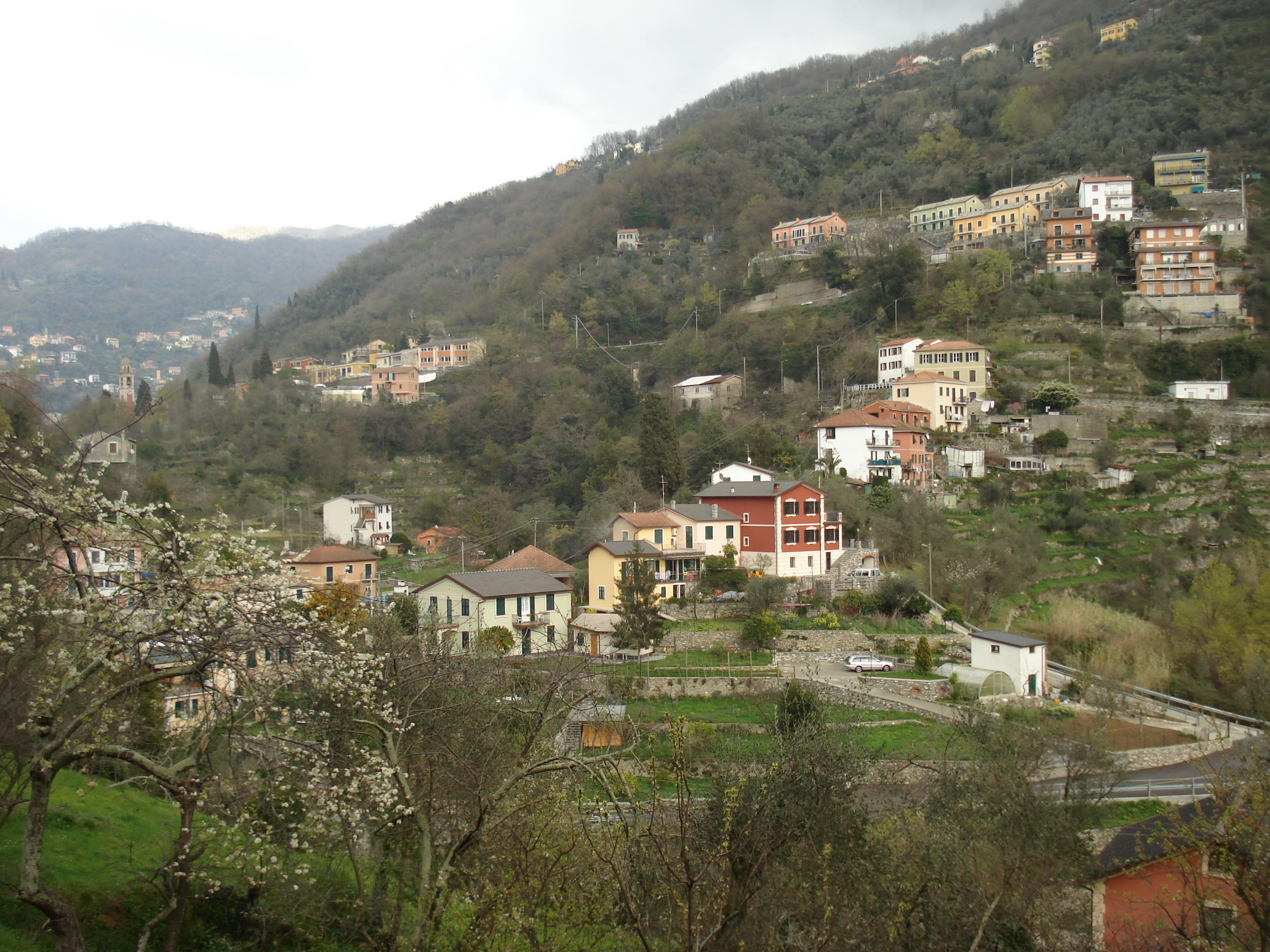
- Avegno

- Coat of arms

- Location within Italy Location within Liguria
- Coordinates: 44°23′N 9°10′E
- Country: Italy
- Region: Liguria
- Metropolitan city: Genoa (GE)
- Frazioni: Avegno Chiesa, Molino Nuovo, Salto, Testana, Vexina

Government
  - Mayor: Franco Canevello

Area
  - Total: 10.93 km^{2} (4.22 sq mi)
- Elevation: 34 m (112 ft)

Population (31 May 2022)
  - Total: 2,520
  - Density: 231/km^{2} (597/sq mi)
- Demonym: Avegnesi
- Time zone: UTC+1 (CET)
  - Summer (DST): UTC+2 (CEST)
- Postal code: 16030
- Dialing code: 0185
- Website: Official website

Avegno (Ligurian: Aegno) is a comune (municipality) in the Metropolitan City of Genoa in the Italian region of Liguria, located about 20 kilometres (12 mi) east of Genoa.

Avegno borders the following municipalities: Rapallo, Recco, Sori, Tribogna, and Uscio.

== Twin towns ==
Avegno is twinned with:

- Avegno Gordevio, Switzerland
