= Lumarzo =

Lumarzo Lumarso
- Comune
- Comune di Lumarzo
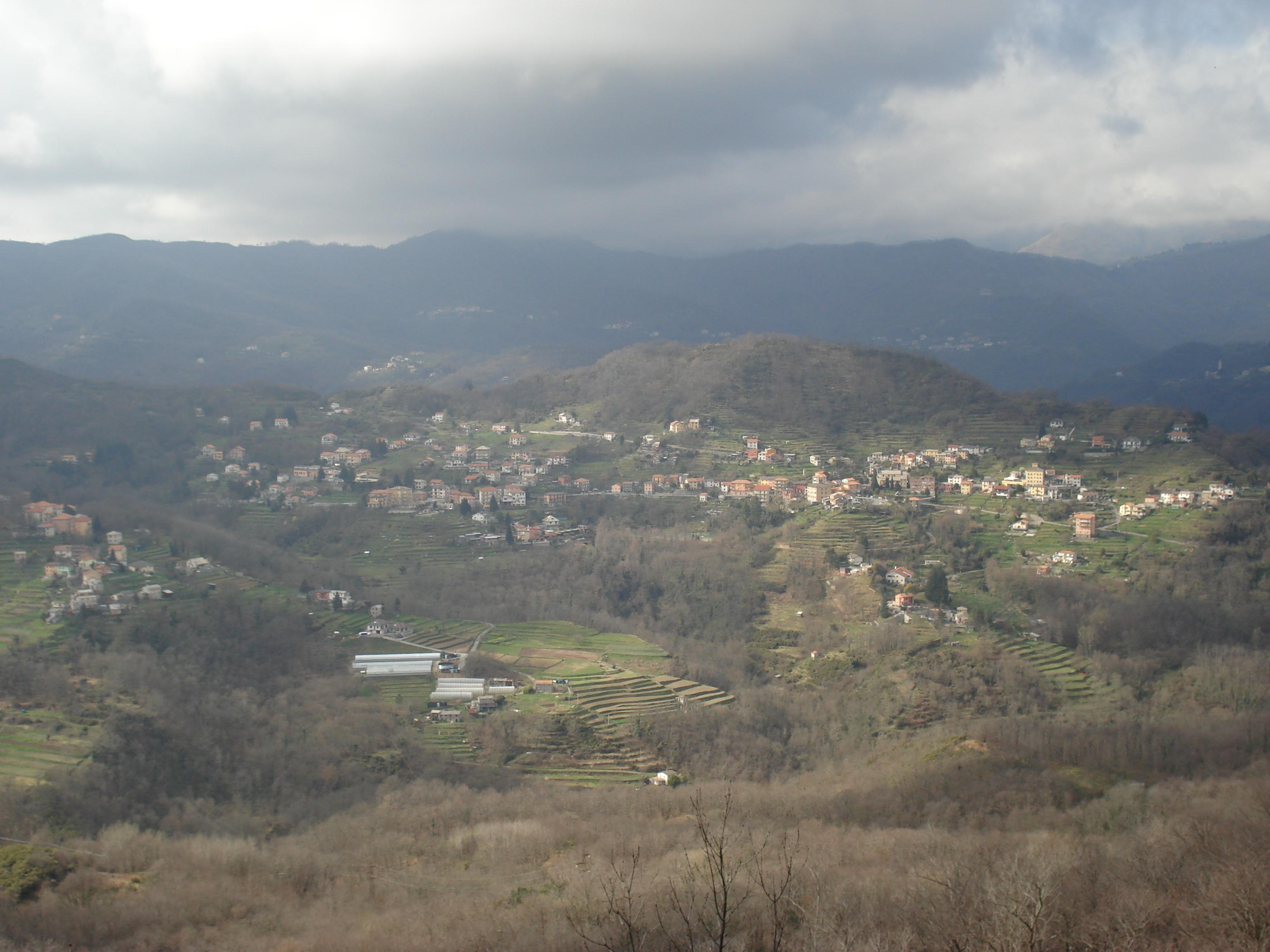

- Coat of arms

- Location within Italy Location within Liguria
- Coordinates: 44°25′N 9°8′E
- Country: Italy
- Region: Liguria
- Metropolitan city: Genoa (GE)
- Frazioni: Boasi, Campi, Cerese, Craviasco, Ferriere, Forca, Lagomarsino, Lainà, Lumarzo, Pannesi, Piancerese, Piane, Recroso, Rossi, Sanguinara, Nostra Signora del Bosco, Scagliola, Scagnelli, Tasso, Tassorello, Tolara, and Vallebuona

Government
  - Mayor: Guido Guelfo

Area
  - Total: 25.5 km^{2} (9.8 sq mi)
- Elevation: 325 m (1,066 ft)

Population (30 September 2017)
  - Total: 1,520
  - Density: 59.6/km^{2} (154/sq mi)
- Demonym: Lumarzesi
- Time zone: UTC+1 (CET)
  - Summer (DST): UTC+2 (CEST)
- Postal code: 16024
- Dialing code: 0185
- Patron saint: St. Peter
- Saint day: June 29
- Website: www.comune.lumarzo.genova.it

Lumarzo (Ligurian: Lumarso) is a comune (municipality) in the Metropolitan City of Genoa in the Italian region Liguria, located about 15 kilometres (9 mi) east of Genoa.

Lumarzo borders the following municipalities: Bargagli, Davagna, Neirone, Sori, Torriglia, Uscio.

The comune (municipality) of Lumarzo includes a number of frazioni (villages), namely, Boasi, Campi, Cerese, Craviasco, Ferriere, Forca, Lagomarsino, Lainà, Lumarzo, Pannesi, Piancerese, Piane, Recroso, Rossi, Sanguinara, Nostra Signora del Bosco, Scagliola, Scagnelli, Tasso, Tassorello, Tolara, and Vallebuona.

The economy is mostly based on agriculture and cattle raising.

== History ==
The name derives from the Latin Lucus martius, meaning "Wood of Mars", which has suggested the existence of a temple, with annexed grove, devoted to the god.

In the Middle Ages it was under the Malaspina and later the Fieschi families. The latter sold the fief to the Republic of Genoa in 1198. After a brief French and Austrian domination in the 18th-19th centuries, it became part of the Kingdom of Sardinia in 1814. Lumarzo was annexed to the newly unified Kingdom of Italy in 1861.

During World War II in the area took place several fighting between German occupation troops and partisans.

Natalina "Dolly" Garaventa, mother of Frank Sinatra, was born in the frazione (village) of Rossi of Lumarzo in 1894.

== Main sights ==
- Sanctuary of Madonna del Bosco ("Madonna of the Wood"), in the frazione of Pannesi, dating from the 16th century.
- Church of San Martino al Vento (15th century).

== Transport ==
Lumarzo can be reached through the Strada Provinciale (Provincial Road) 225 Orero-Bargagli. The nearest railroad station is that of Chiavari on the Rome-Genoa line, from where a regular bus service connects to Lumarzo.

== Notable people ==
- Dolly Sinatra – mother of Frank Sinatra

== Sources ==
- Sena, Francesco (2000). L'alta Fontanabuona. Chiavari.
