= Fontanigorda =

Fontanigorda Fontanegorda
- Comune
- Comune di Fontanigorda
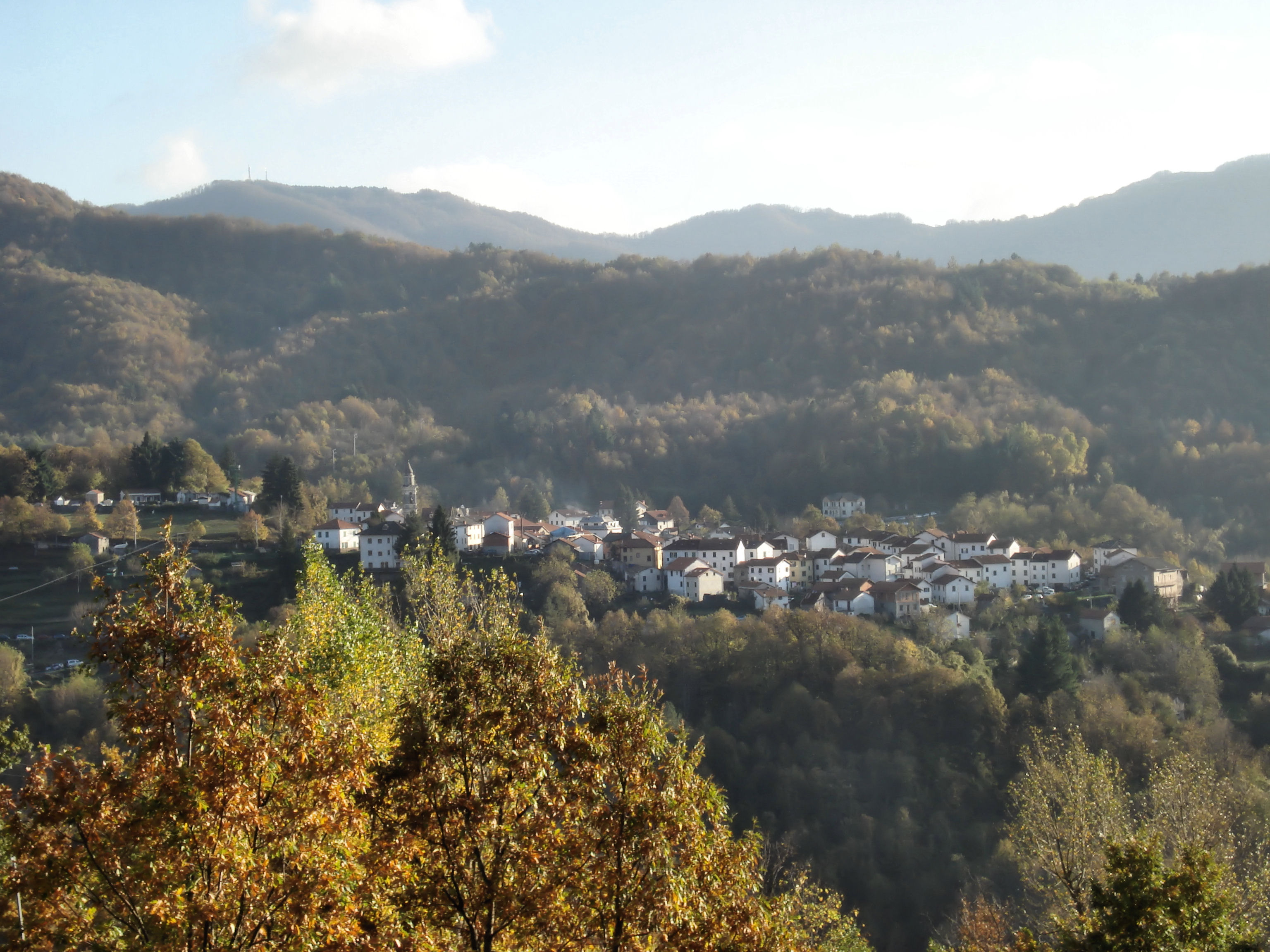

- Coat of arms

- Location within Italy Location within Liguria
- Coordinates: 44°33′N 9°18′E
- Country: Italy
- Region: Liguria
- Metropolitan city: Genoa (GE)
- Frazioni: Canale, Cerreta, Casoni, Barcaggio, Villanova, Vallescura

Government
  - Mayor: Bruno Franceschi

Area
  - Total: 16.16 km^{2} (6.24 sq mi)
- Elevation: 800 m (2,600 ft)

Population (31 May 2022)
  - Total: 240
  - Density: 15/km^{2} (38/sq mi)
- Demonym: Fontanigordesi
- Time zone: UTC+1 (CET)
  - Summer (DST): UTC+2 (CEST)
- Postal code: 16023
- Dialing code: 010
- Website: Official website

Fontanigorda (Ligurian: Fontanegorda) is a comune (municipality) in the Metropolitan City of Genoa in the Italian region Liguria, located about 35 kilometres (22 mi) northeast of Genoa.

Fontanigorda borders the following municipalities: Fascia, Montebruno, Rezzoaglio, Rovegno.

== Twin towns ==
Fontanigorda is twinned with:

- Saint-Maime, France (1997)
