= Uscio =

Uscio Aosci
- Comune
- Comune di Uscio
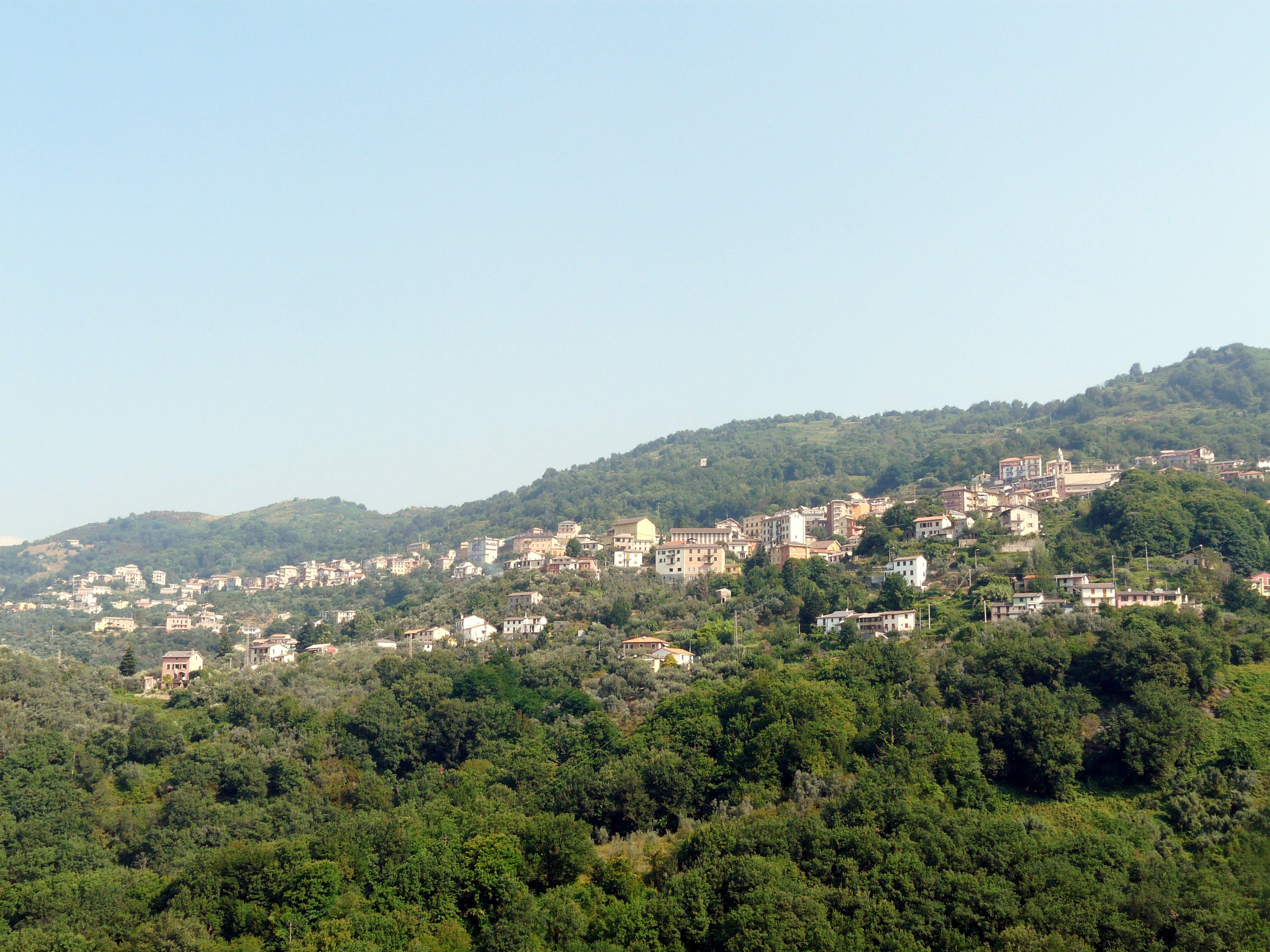
- Uscio

- Coat of arms

- Location within Italy Location within Liguria
- Coordinates: 44°25′N 9°10′E
- Country: Italy
- Region: Liguria
- Metropolitan city: Genoa (GE)
- Frazioni: Calcinara, Terrile

Government
  - Mayor: Giuseppe Garbarino

Area
  - Total: 9.63 km^{2} (3.72 sq mi)
- Elevation: 361 m (1,184 ft)

Population (31 December 2015)
  - Total: 2,284
  - Density: 237/km^{2} (614/sq mi)
- Demonym: Usciesi
- Time zone: UTC+1 (CET)
  - Summer (DST): UTC+2 (CEST)
- Postal code: 16030
- Dialing code: 0185
- Website: Official website

Uscio (Ligurian: Aosci) is a comune (municipality) in the Metropolitan City of Genoa, in the Italian region of Liguria, located about 20 kilometres (12 mi) east of Genoa.

Uscio borders the following municipalities: Avegno, Lumarzo, Neirone, Sori, Tribogna.
