= Ferrada =

Ferrada is a surname. Notable people with the surname include:

- María José Ferrada (born 1977), Chilean journalist and writer
- Paula Ferrada (born 1977), Colombian surgeon and physician
- Soraya Martínez Ferrada (born 1972), Chilean-Canadian politician
- Rodrigo Ferrada (born 1969), Chilean social worker
