= Massilia (disambiguation) =

Massilia is the Latin name of the ancient Greek city Massalia, now Marseille.

Massilia may also refer to:

- Massilia (bacterium), a genus of bacteria
- Massilia, a 2014 album by Massilia Sound System
- Massilians, Gaulish followers of Pelagius
  - Massilianism, an earlier name of Semi-Pelagianism
- SS Massilia, ship of the Compagnie de Navigation Sud-Atlantique

== See also ==
- Marseille (disambiguation)
- Marsiglia (disambiguation)
