= O todos en la cama =

- Created by: Bernardo Romero Pereiro
- Written by: Juan Carlos Pérez
- Directed by: Toni Navia
- Starring: Martha Restrepo; Andrea López; Carlos Humberto Camacho; Oscar Salazar; Freddy Flórez; Álvaro Castillo; Edwin Eissner
- Country of origin: Colombia
- No. of seasons: 4
- No. of episodes: 156

Production
- Running time: 23 minutes (per episode)
- Production company: RCN Televisión

Original release
- Network: Canal A
- Release: 1994 – 1997

O todos en la cama is a Colombian sitcom produced by RCN TV and broadcast on Canal A from June 1994 until his cancellation in June 1997. The sitcom is about seven university students (five men and two women) from different regions sharing an apartment in Bogotá.

== Story ==
Seven students from different regions of Colombia are reunited in a tiny apartment (Then a house). Despite their differences, they start a very strong friendship and start caring for each other. Even a relationship starts between Rebeca and Juan Manuel.

At the middle of their second year on the air (1996), Carlos Humberto Camacho and Andrea López left the series after being hired to star in the soap opera "Prisioneros del Amor". This forced changes in the story: "La Rana" and Juan Manuel fell in love and ran away. Rebeca discovered that she was pregnant and fell in love with Pablo Caminos. At the end of the year, they married and their characters left the series. Actresses Sandra Muñoz ("Cristina"), Fabiana Medina ("Ana") and actor Guido Molina ("Cacho") were introduced to the series, but lost steam and declining ratings led to their cancellation in June 1997.

== Cast ==
- Martha Restrepo as Rebeca Vega, veterinary student from Pereira, Juan Manuel's girlfriend
- Andrea López as Inés Mercedes Videla, a.k.a. La rana, social communication student
- Carlos Humberto Camacho as Juan Manuel Ríos, architecture student from Antioquia, Rebeca's boyfriend
- Oscar Salazar as Pablo Caminos, music student from Pasto
- Freddy Flórez as Guillermo Leyes, law student from the Caribbean coast
- Álvaro Castillo as Julián Bam Bam Corredor, student from Cali
- Edwin Eissner as Eduardo Blanco, management student from Bogotá
- Hernando el Chato Latorre as Armando Mesoneros
- Paola Fernández as Selene
- Bárbara Perea as Rafaela Mercado
- María Margarita Giraldo as Eduardo's mother
- Paula Ferrada as Chavela, Bam Bam's cousin
- Fabiana Medina as Ana (last season)
- Sandra Muñoz as Cristina (last season)
- Guido Molina as Cacho (last season)
