= Eastern Association for the Surgery of Trauma =

Nonprofit organization based in Chicago, the United States

- Abbreviation: EAST
- Formation: 1987
- Founders: Howard R. Champion, Burton H. Harris, Lenworth M. Jacobs, Kimball I. Maull
- Location: Chicago, Illinois
- Members: >2,000 (2017)
- President: A. Britton Christmas
- President-elect: Andrew C. Bernard
- Website: east.org

The Eastern Association for the Surgery of Trauma is a 501(c)(3) medical association of American trauma surgeons. It has over 2,000 members who meet at an annual four-day conference. Its official journal is the Journal of Trauma and Acute Care Surgery.
