= Raymond of Marseilles =

French astronomer and astrologer

Raymond of Marseilles (fl. 1140) was a French astronomer and astrologer who is known only from his manuscripts on the use of astrolabes and translations of Arab astronomical texts of the period. His manuscript on astrolabes Traite de l'astrolabe or Vite presentis indutias silentio, a copy of which is in Paris served as a source for European astronomers in the Medieval period. The texts, originally of unknown authorship, were noted by Pierre Duhem in 1915 and in the 1920s by Lynn Thorndike and Charles Homer Haskins. The Paris manuscript which is the most complete version was found by Emmanuel Poulle in 1954. Another work was the first volume of Opera omnia which included Liber cursuum planetarum. Raymond's work included translations of the astronomical tables (Toledan Tables) of al-Zarqālī. In 1972 another text, Liber judiciorum, on astrology was discovered by Marie-Thérèse d’Alverny.
