= Inova Fairfax Hospital =

- Inova Health System
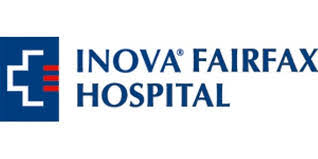

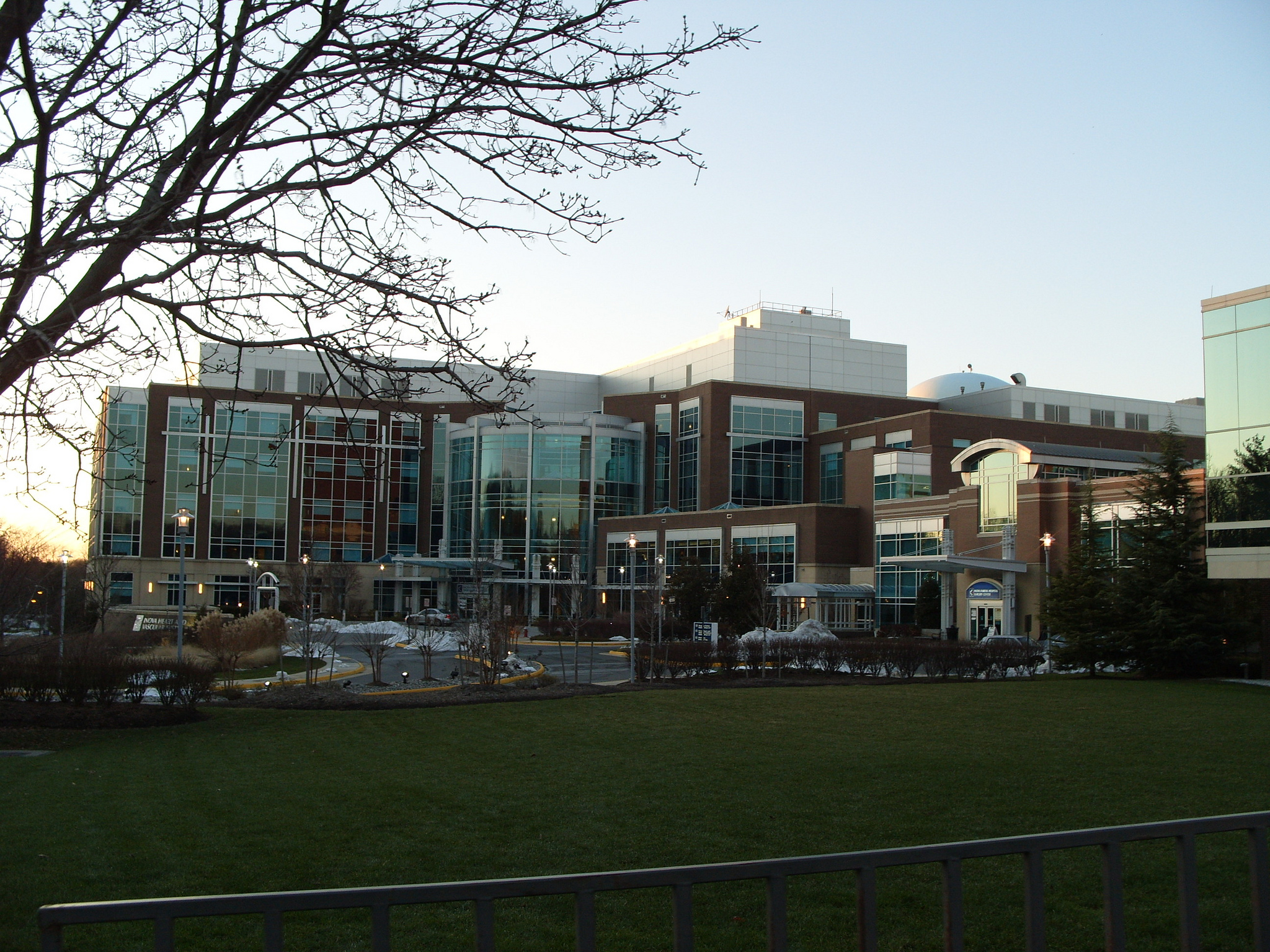
- Inova Hospital in December 2009

Geography
- Location: 3300 Gallows Road, Falls Church 22042, Washington metropolitan area, U.S.
- Coordinates: 38.8575°N 77.2278°W

Organisation
- Affiliated university: University of Virginia School of Medicine; Virginia Commonwealth University School of Pharmacy

Services
- Emergency department: Level I trauma center
- Beds: 923

Helipads
- Helipad: FAA LID: 72VA

History
- Founded: December 5, 1961; 64 years ago

Links
- Website: https://www.inova.org/locations/inova-fairfax-hospital
- Lists: Hospitals in U.S.

Inova Fairfax Hospital is a hospital in Fairfax County, Virginia and the flagship facility of the Inova Health System. Located just outside the limits of Falls Church, Virginia, it is the largest hospital campus in Northern Virginia as well as one of the largest employers in the county. Inova Fairfax Hospital contains Northern Virginia's only adult Level I Trauma Center, as well as a neonatal intensive care unit, pediatric intensive care unit, oncology unit, adolescent medicine unit, and centers for cardiac surgery and pediatric surgery.

The Inova Fairfax Hospital can be more accurately described as a campus encompassing three hospitals: the Inova Fairfax Hospital proper, which includes the original building; the Inova Children's Hospital; and the Inova Heart and Vascular Institute.

== History ==
Fairfax Hospital first opened on February 6th, 1961 as a 282-bed hospital. Over the next 10 years, it expanded its capacity and built a medical library and outpatient facility. By 1973, the hospital contained up to 614 beds and possessed an orthopedics unit, a stroke unit, a pediatric intensive care unit, a neonatology program, a pulmonary function lab, and an infectious diseases program. The Fairfax Hospital Women and Children's Center opened in 1992. In 1997, Fairfax Hospital was renamed Inova Fairfax Hospital. In 2004, the hospital opened the Inova Heart and Vascular Institute.

== Capabilities ==
Inova Fairfax Hospital is a 923-bed tertiary care hospital campus providing most medical and surgical specialties and houses Northern Virginia's only Level I Trauma Center and the nation's fifth-busiest obstetrics program (with nearly 12,000 live births in 2006). It is one of only six community hospitals in the nation offering the full spectrum of organ transplantation. It has been named among the top 50 hospitals for gastrointestinal disorders, gynecology, and heart surgery by U.S. News & World Report.

In 2016, Inova Fairfax and University of Virginia Health System announced a partnership involving a $112 million research institute and a University of Virginia School of Medicine regional campus at Inova. The plan involves developing a Global Genomics and Bioinformatics Research Institute at the Inova Center for Personalized Health, which will be funded by UVA, Inova, and the Virginia General Assembly. They also intend to collaborate on research between the Inova Schar Cancer Institute and the University of Virginia Cancer Research Center.

Inova Fairfax Hospital is also a satellite clinical campus for students from the University of Virginia School of Medicine and hosts residents from other universities in the area. The hospital also houses the Virginia Commonwealth University School of Pharmacy’s Inova Campus in which students can complete their third and fourth years of training.

== Size ==
The following were statistics at the end of the year ending June 30, 2009:

- Admissions: 54,361
- Inpatient surgeries: 19,349
- Outpatient visits: 392,405
- Emergency room visits: 98,317
- Births: 11,182
- Number of beds: 833

Inova Fairfax's emergency room had nearly 175,000 patients in 2023, which made it the nation’s fourth busiest.

== Awards ==
- Best Hospitals, U.S. News & World Report: 2021, 2012, 2011, 2010, 2009, 2008, 2007, 2006, 2005, 2004, 2003, 2002, 2001, 2000
- Best Hospitals, U.S. News & World Report: 2014 Gynecology Nationally Ranked #19
- Best Hospitals, Heart and Heart Surgery, U.S. News & World Report: #21 (2007)
- Magnet Nursing Status: American Nurses Association
- America's 50 Best Hospitals: 2007-2012 by HealthGrades
- 50 Best Hospitals in America: February 23, 2011, by Becker's Hospital Review

The hospital has received numerous other awards as well.

== Hospital rating data ==
The HealthGrades website contains the clinical quality data for Inova Fairfax Hospital, as of 2017. For this rating section three different types of data from HealthGrades are presented: clinical quality ratings for thirty-eight inpatient conditions and procedures, thirteen patient safety indicators and the percentage of patients giving the hospital as a 9 or 10 (the two highest possible ratings).

For inpatient conditions and procedures, there are three possible ratings: worse than expected, as expected, better than expected. For this hospital the data for this category is:

- Worse than expected - 5
- As expected - 24
- Better than expected - 9

For patient safety indicators, there are the same three possible ratings. For this hospital safety indicators were rated as:

- Worse than expected - 1
- As expected - 10
- Better than expected - 2

Percentage of patients rating this hospital as a 9 or 10 - 76% Percentage of patients who on average rank hospitals as a 9 or 10 - 69%
