= The Journal of Trauma and Acute Care Surgery =

Peer-reviewed medical journal

- Discipline: trauma surgery
- Language: English
- Edited by: Raul Coimbra

Publication details
- Former name(s): Journal of Trauma
- History: 1961–present
- Publisher: Lippincott Williams & Wilkins
- Frequency: Monthly
- Impact factor: 3.403 (2016)

Standard abbreviations
- ISO 4: J. Trauma Acute Care Surg.

Indexing
- ISSN: 2163-0755 (print); 2163-0763 (web)
- OCLC no.: 747553570

Links
- Journal homepage; Online access; Online archive

The Journal of Trauma and Acute Care Surgery is a monthly peer-reviewed medical journal covering the study of traumatic injuries. It was established in 1961 as the Journal of Trauma by Williams & Wilkins, obtaining its current name in 2012. The journal is currently published by Lippincott Williams & Wilkins and is the official journal of the American Association for the Surgery of Trauma, the Eastern Association for the Surgery of Trauma, the Trauma Association of Canada, and the Western Trauma Association. The editor-in-chief is Raul Coimbra (Riverside University Health System).

== Abstracting and indexing ==
According to the Journal Citation Reports, the journal has a 2016 impact factor of 3.403, ranking it 11th out of 33 journals in the category "Critical Care Medicine".

== See also ==
- List of medical journals
