= Inova Health System =

American nonprofit health organization

INOVA Health Care Services
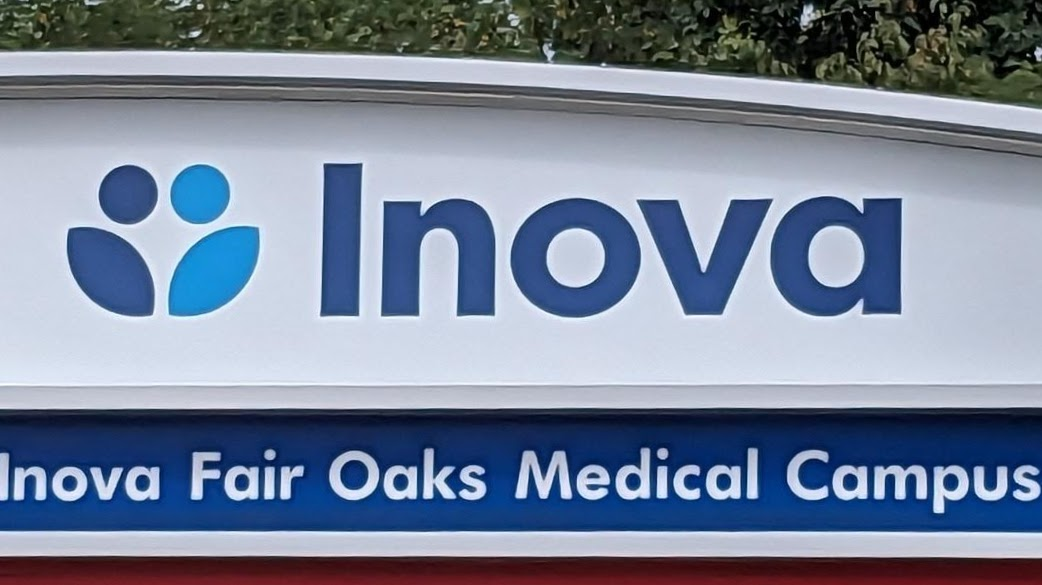
- Trade name: INOVA Health System
- Formerly: Fairfax Hospital Association
- Type: Not-for-profit organization
- Industry: Hospitals and health care services
- Founded: Fairfax County, Virginia, U.S. April 20, 1956; 70 years ago
- Key people: J. Stephen Jones (president and CEO); Steve Motew, MD, MHA (chief physician executive)
- Revenue: $2.699 billion (2014)
- Number of employees: 17,396 (2014)
- Website: inova.org

Inova Health System is a not-for-profit health organization based in Falls Church, Virginia, United States, near Washington, D.C. The system is a network of hospitals, outpatient services, assisted living and long-term care facilities, and healthcare centers in the Northern Virginia market.

The system's hospitals provide much of the healthcare needs for citizens in Northern Virginia, including the cities of Alexandria, Fairfax and Falls Church and Fairfax County and Loudoun County. The flagship hospital, Inova Fairfax Hospital, has been recognized as one of the best hospitals in the nation by HealthGrades and U.S. News & World Report.

== History ==
In the early 1950s, residents of Fairfax County, Virginia, perceived a need for a community hospital, as they were forced to travel to Arlington, Alexandria, or Washington, D.C., to obtain hospital services and care. The Fairfax County Hospital Commission incorporated the Fairfax Hospital Association (FHA) in February 1956.

Five months after Franklin P. Iams took on the role of administrator in July 1958, construction of the $6 million Fairfax Hospital began in November, and the hospital opened in February 1961. In 1976, the association took over the lease of Commonwealth Doctors Hospital in the City of Fairfax and opened Mount Vernon Hospital in the southeastern portion of the county. The following year, the association opened an emergency care center, ACCESS (Ambulatory Care Center- Emergency Services System) in Reston.

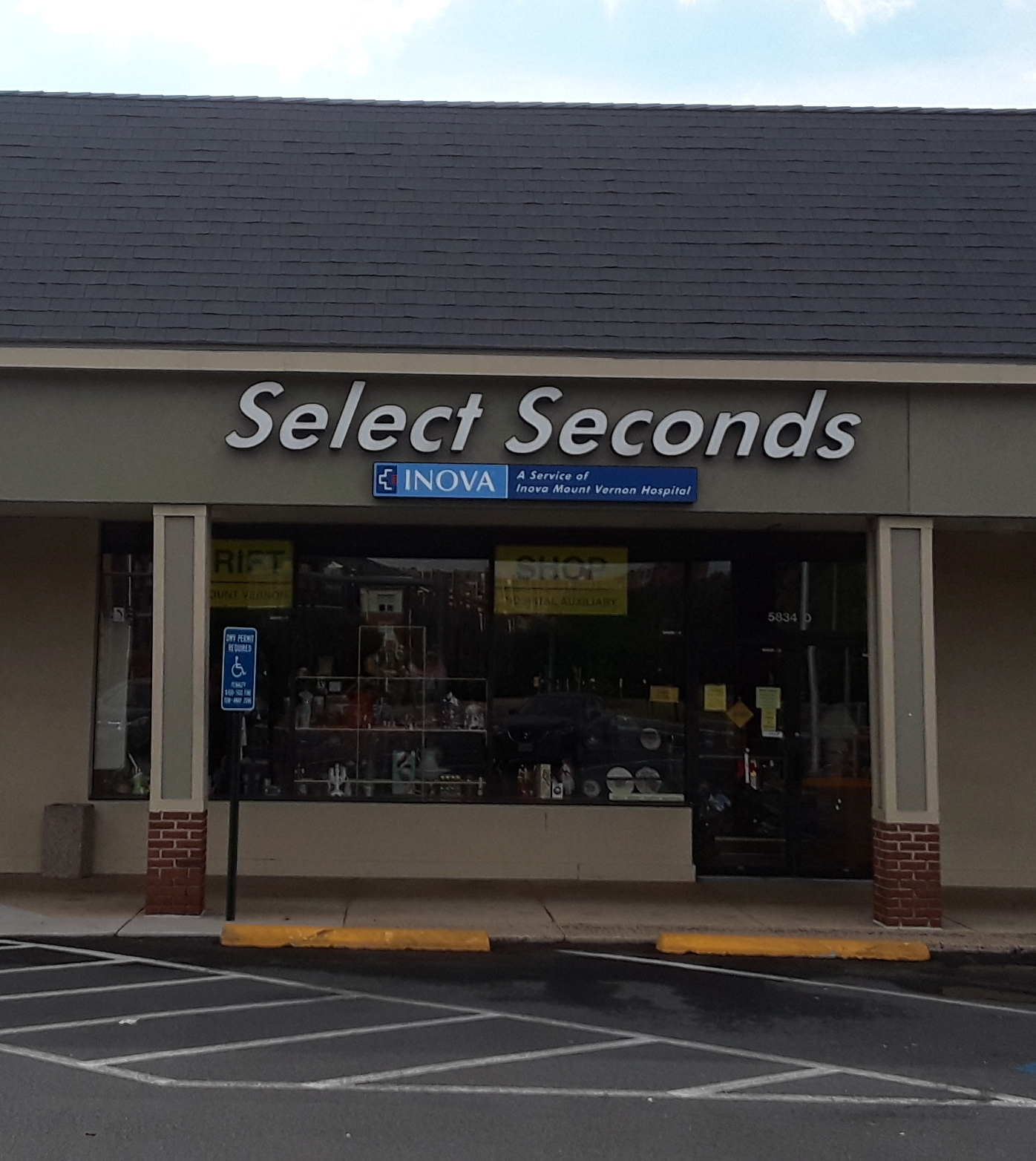
Storefront of Inova Select Seconds, a thrift store in Huntington, Virginia, run by the Inova Auxiliary

Following the retirement of Franklin P. Iams, J. Knox Singleton became president of the Fairfax Hospital Association in 1984. The association took the Jefferson Memorial Hospital in Alexandria in August 1985, and opened the $27 million Fair Oaks Hospital in June 1987, replacing Commonwealth Doctors Hospital, which was converted into a long-term care center.

The Fairfax Hospital Association began operating under the Inova name in 1987, but did not formally take on the Inova name until 1991, when its successor corporation Fairfax Hospital System became Inova Hospitals.

In March 1988, Inova opened the Cameron Glen Care Center nursing home in Reston; and merged with the nearly 125-year-old Alexandria Hospital in July 1996. Inova opened the Inova HealthPlex, an ambulatory care center, in the Franconia/Springfield area in April 2001.

In 2003, Inova laid off 113 of its 14,000 employees and considered moving Inova Mount Vernon Hospital in an attempt to cut costs.

In October 2004, the system merged with Loudoun Healthcare, adding the Loudoun Hospital Center to its portfolio.

Mark S. Stauder became the chief operating officer of Inova Health Systems in September 2006.

In June 2008, Inova dropped its plans to merge with Prince William Health System, which ran the Prince William Hospital, following a legal challenge by the Federal Trade Commission. Prince William Health System instead merged with North Carolina–based Novant Health the following year.

In 2010, Inova sold its Cameron Glen Care Center and Commonwealth Care Center nursing homes to Northern Virginia Health Investors, a joint venture of Commonwealth Care of Roanoke and Smith/Packett Med-Com, which operated the facilities for a few years before building new ones in Sterling and Oakton.

Inova opened its second HealthPlex in the Lorton area in March 2013.

For a few years previous, health care provider Kaiser Permanente had been moving away from referring its subscribers to Inova facilities, instead fostering relationships with Reston Hospital Center in western Fairfax County and Virginia Hospital Center in Arlington. Inova joined with Aetna to form a jointly owned health insurance company, Innovation Health Plans, in 2012. In 2013, Inova and Kaiser completely broke ties.

After several years of planning to expand into the field of genomic medicine, Inova announced in February 2015 that it had signed a 99-year lease with an option to buy for ExxonMobil's 117-acre campus in Merrifield, intending to use the property as the site for the Inova Center for Personalized Health, a facility to provide research, education and patient treatment through therapies tailored to the individual patient based on their genetics.

In 2016, Inova and the University of Virginia Health System announced an agreement to form a partnership between the two systems. This includes a regional campus of UVA at Inova Fairfax, the development of a Global Genomics and Bioinformatics Research Institute at the Inova Center for Personalized Health, and a research partnership between the cancer centers of the two facilities.

On April 9, 2018, J. Knox Singleton retired as CEO of Inova Health System, naming J. Stephen Jones, MD as his successor.

On June 30, 2020, Inova purchased ExxonMobil's 117-acre campus in Merrifield for $182.5 million.

On October 2, 2023, Inova launched a "comprehensive rebranding initiative with a fresh new logo, look and tone."

Starting in 2015, Inova hired private military contractor Allied Universal to provide security guards with de-escalation training, to help prevent violent incidents.

== Precision medicine ==
Through the Inova Center for Personalized Health, Inova has made notable investments in precision medicine.

In 2019, Inova stopped pharmacogenomic testing after receiving a warning letter from the FDA.
