= Bargagli =

- Comune
- Comune di Bargagli
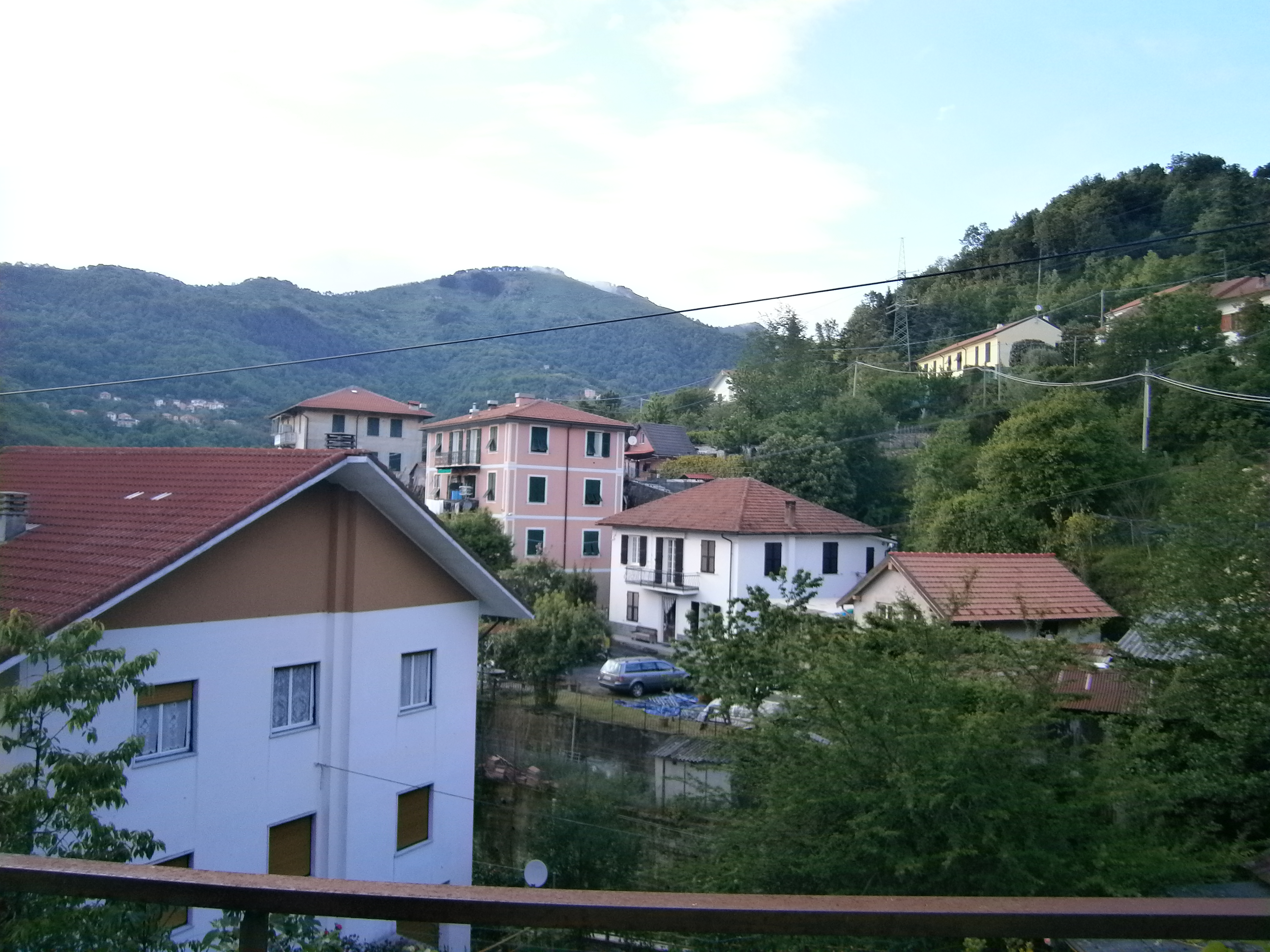

- Coat of arms

- Location within Italy Location within Liguria
- Coordinates: 44°27′N 9°6′E
- Country: Italy
- Region: Liguria
- Metropolitan city: Genoa (GE)
- Frazioni: Cisiano, Maxena, Terrusso, Traso, Viganego

Government
  - Mayor: Sergio Casalini

Area
  - Total: 16.28 km^{2} (6.29 sq mi)
- Elevation: 341 m (1,119 ft)

Population (30 April 2017)
  - Total: 27,697
  - Density: 1,701/km^{2} (4,406/sq mi)
- Demonym: Bargaglini
- Time zone: UTC+1 (CET)
  - Summer (DST): UTC+2 (CEST)
- Postal code: 16021
- Dialing code: 010
- Patron saint: Assumption of the Virgin Mary
- Saint day: August 15
- Website: Official website

Bargagli (Ligurian: Bargaggi) is a comune (municipality) in the Metropolitan City of Genoa in the Italian region Liguria, located about 14 kilometres (9 mi) northeast of Genoa in the Val di Lentro.

Bargagli borders the following municipalities: Davagna, Genoa, Lumarzo, and Sori.

== Main sights ==
- The pieve of Santa Maria Assunta, dating to 935, one of the most ancient in Liguria.
