= Dauphin, Alpes-de-Haute-Provence =

Dauphin
- Commune
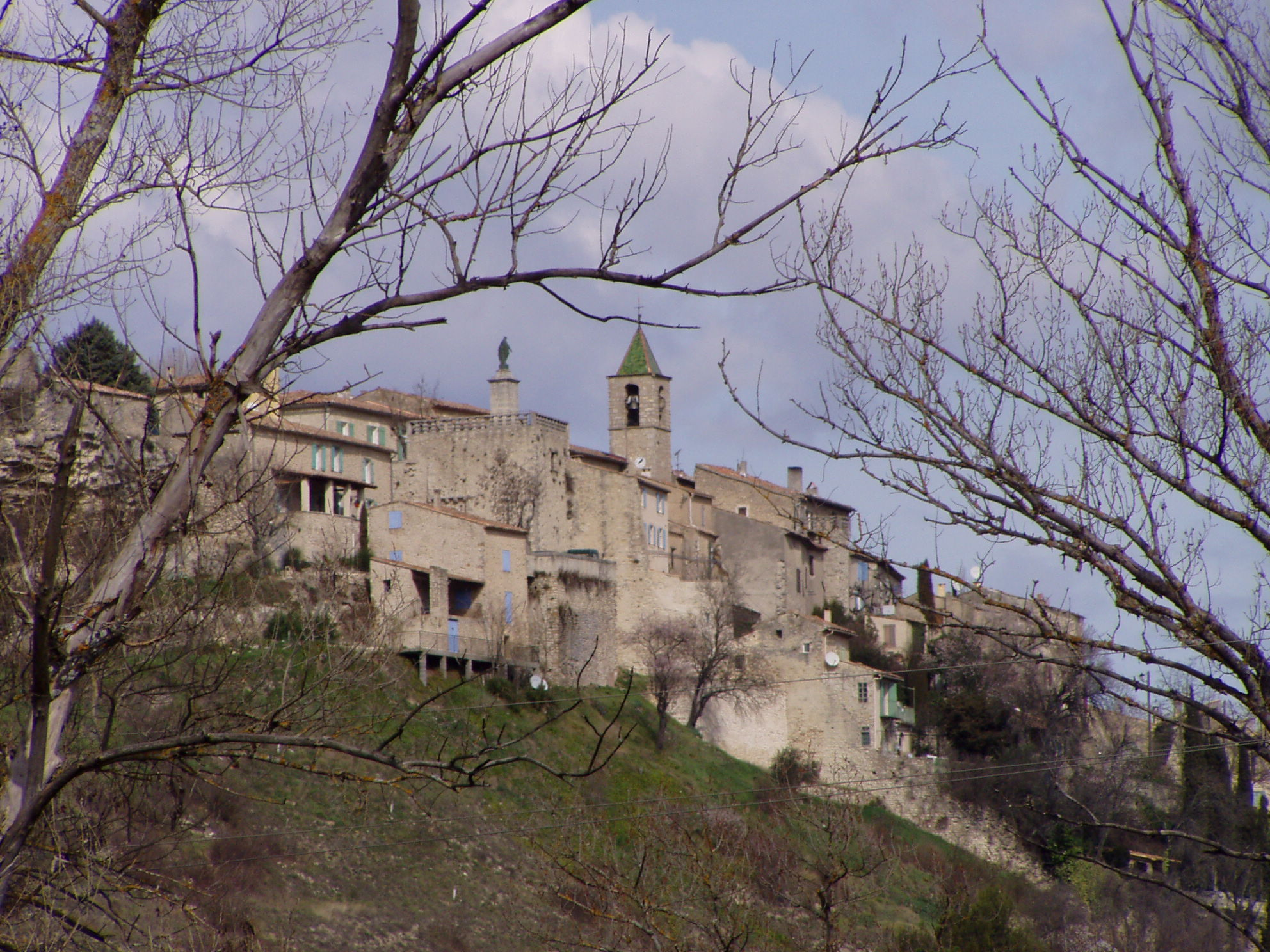
- A view of the village of Dauphin

- Coat of arms
- Location of Dauphin
- Location within France Location within Provence-Alpes-Côte d'Azur
- Coordinates: 43°53′57″N 5°47′01″E
- Country: France
- Region: Provence-Alpes-Côte d'Azur
- Department: Alpes-de-Haute-Provence
- Arrondissement: Forcalquier
- Canton: Reillanne
- Intercommunality: Haute-Provence Pays de Banon

Government
  - Mayor (2026–32): Jean-Marc Ferry
- Area^{1}: 9.71 km^{2} (3.75 sq mi)
- Elevation: 445 m (1,460 ft)
- Highest elevation: 656 m (2,152 ft)
- Lowest elevation: 364 m (1,194 ft)
- Population (2023): 838
  - Density: 86.3/km^{2} (224/sq mi)
- Time zone: UTC+01:00 (CET)
  - Summer (DST): UTC+02:00 (CEST)
- INSEE/Postal code: 04068 /04300
- ^{1} French Land Register data, which excludes lakes, ponds, glaciers > 1 km^{2} (0.386 sq mi or 247 acres) and river estuaries.

Dauphin (French pronunciation: [dofɛ̃]; Occitan: Daufin) is a commune in the Alpes-de-Haute-Provence department in southeastern France. Michèle Bertin was reelected mayor of Dauphin in 2020.

== Population ==
Historical population
Year	Pop.	±% p.a.
1968	357	—
1975	328	−1.20%
1982	469	+5.24%
1990	684	+4.83%
1999	796	+1.70%
2007	784	−0.19%
2012	806	+0.56%
2017	831	+0.61%
2023	838	+0.14%
Source: INSEE

== See also ==
- Luberon
- Communes of the Alpes-de-Haute-Provence department
