= Eclecticism in architecture =

Architectural style

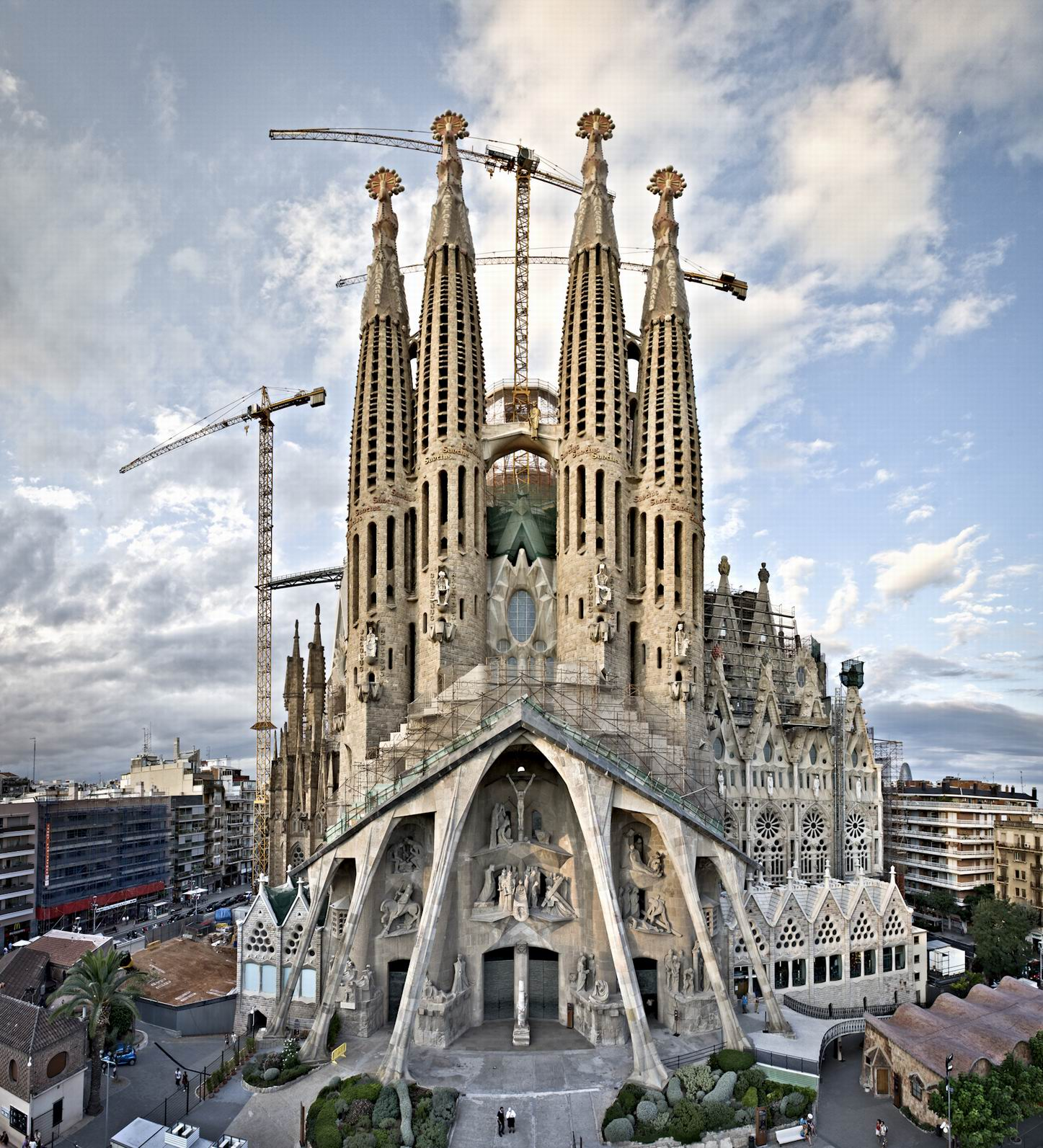
The Basilica of the Sagrada Família in Barcelona designed by Antoni Gaudí is a notable example of eclecticism in architecture. Elements of the Gothic style were merged with Art Nouveau motifs and forms found in the natural world, resulting in a structure that was distinctive and original. Although it was designed during the peak of the eclectic period (1883–1926), it remains under construction today.

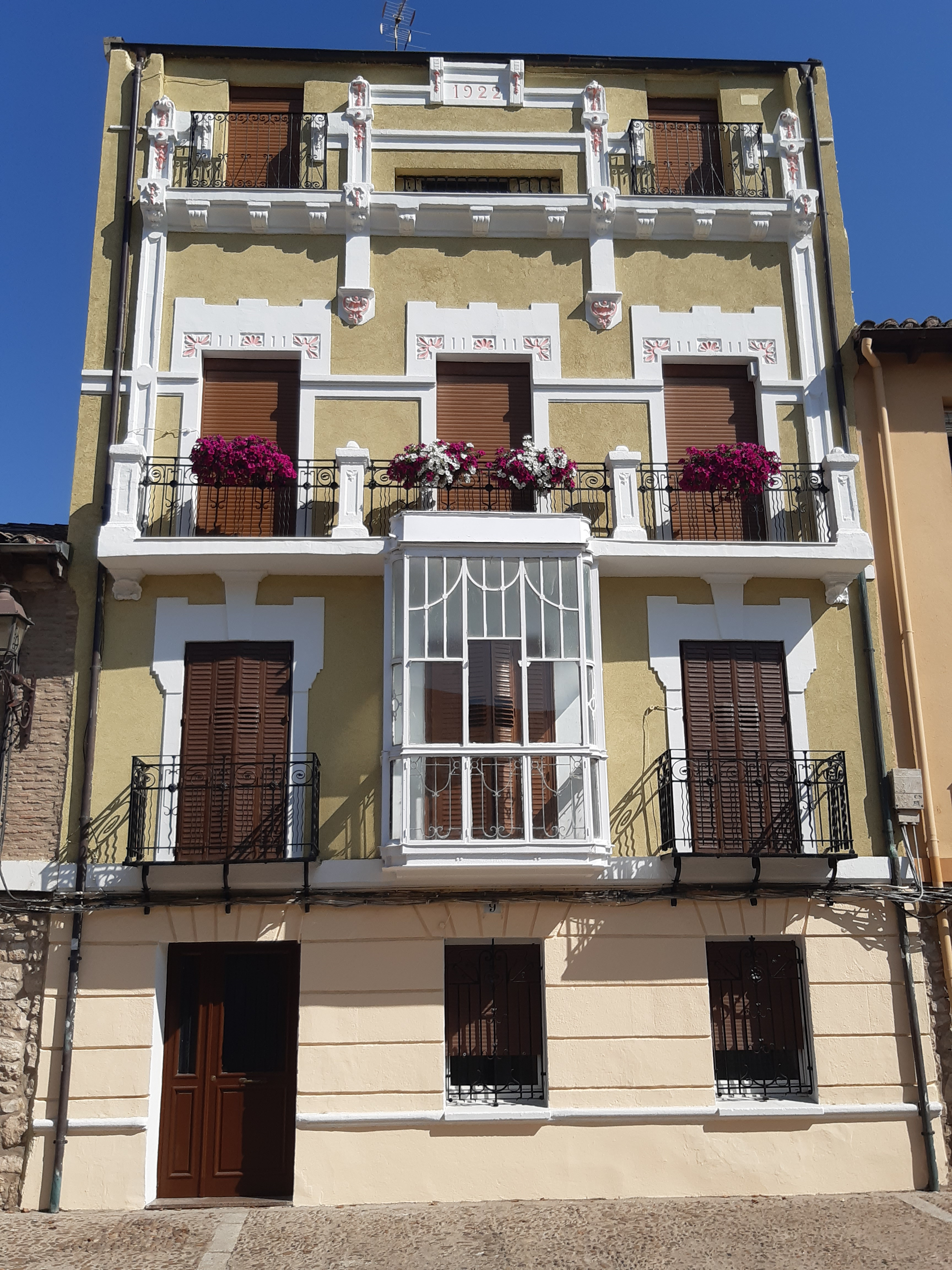
Eclectic building. Street Alfonso VIII. Burgos, Spain (1922). Note the mix of neogothic with art nouveau and neoclassical styles

Eclecticism is a 19th and 20th century architectural style in which a single piece of work incorporates eclecticism, a mixture of elements from previous historical styles to create something that is new and original. In architecture and interior design, these elements may include structural features, furniture, decorative motives, distinct historical ornament, traditional cultural motifs or styles from other countries, with the mixture usually chosen based on its suitability to the project and overall aesthetic value.

The term is also used of the many architects of the 19th and early 20th centuries who designed buildings in a variety of styles according to the wishes of their clients, or their own. The styles were typically revivalist, and each building might be mostly or entirely consistent within the style selected, or itself an eclectic mixture. Gothic Revival architecture, especially in churches, was most likely to strive for a relatively "pure" revival style from a particular medieval period and region, while other revived styles such as Neoclassical, Baroque, Palazzo style, Jacobethan, Romanesque and many others were likely to be treated more freely.

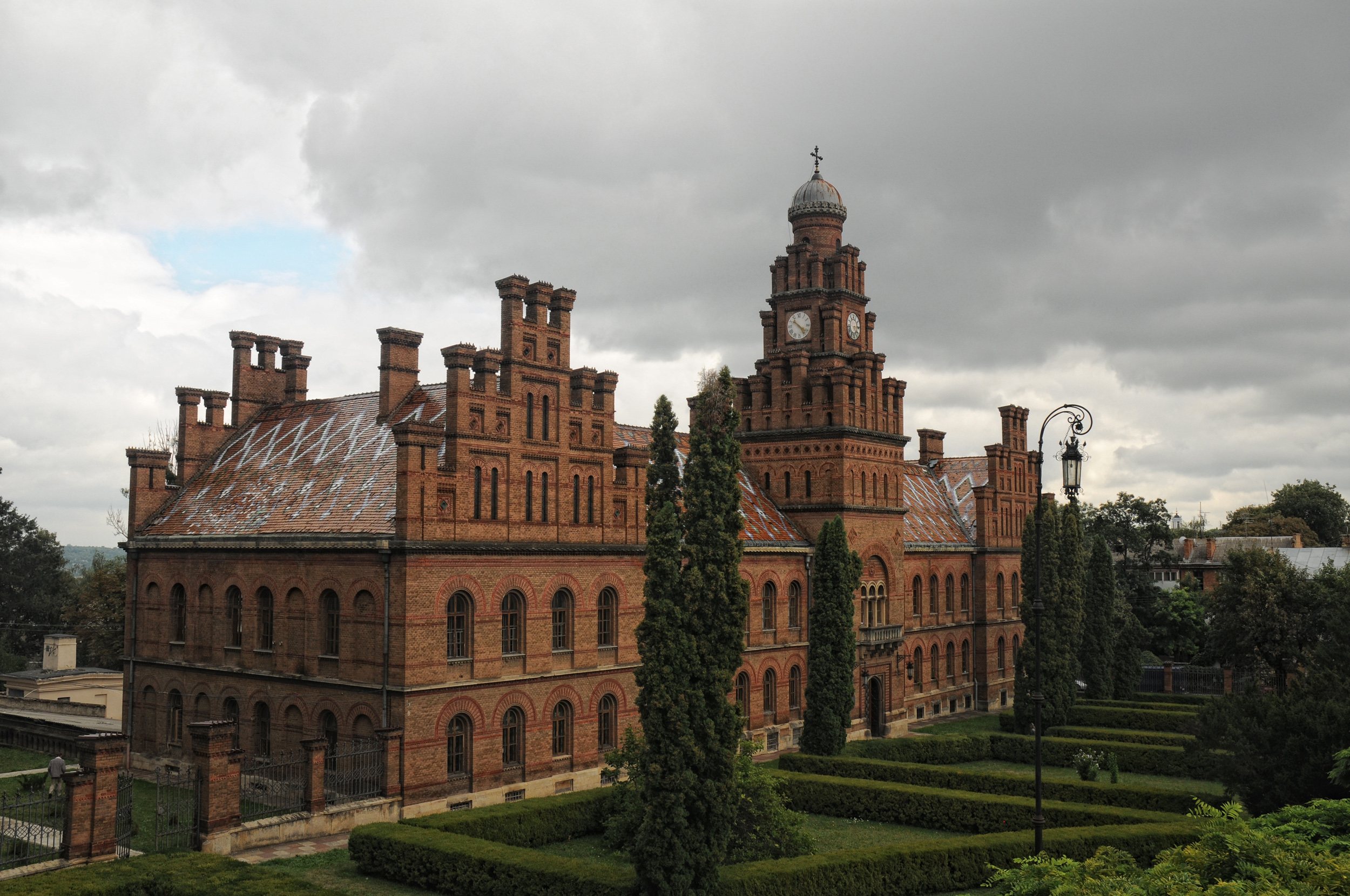
Residence of Bukovinian and Dalmatian Metropolitans, by Josef Hlávka, 1882, Chernivtsi, Ukraine, with a basis in Brick Gothic.

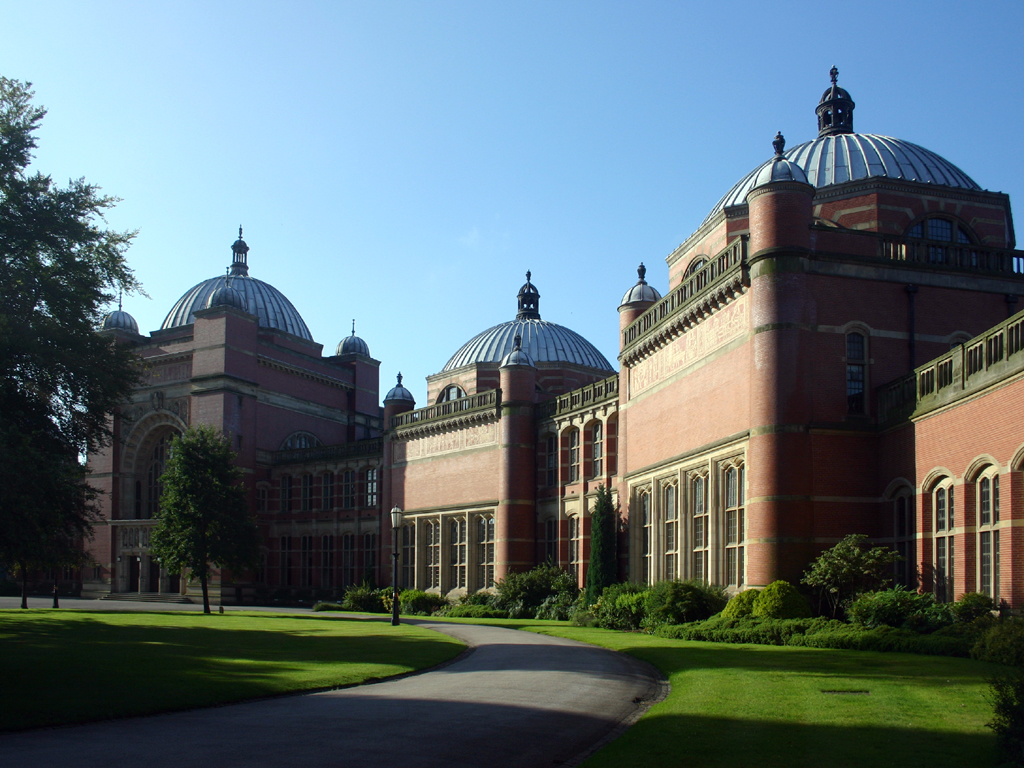
The Aston Webb building at the University of Birmingham (1900–12), UK, in a quasi-Byzantine style.

== History ==
Eclecticist architecture came into practice during the late 19th century, as architects sought a style that would allow them to retain previous historic precedent, but create unseen designs. From a complete catalogue of past styles, the ability to mix and combine styles allowed for more expressive freedom and provided an endless source of inspiration. Whilst other design professionals (referred to as 'revivalists') aimed to meticulously imitate past styles, Eclecticism differed, as the main driving force was creation, not nostalgia and there was a desire for the designs to be original.

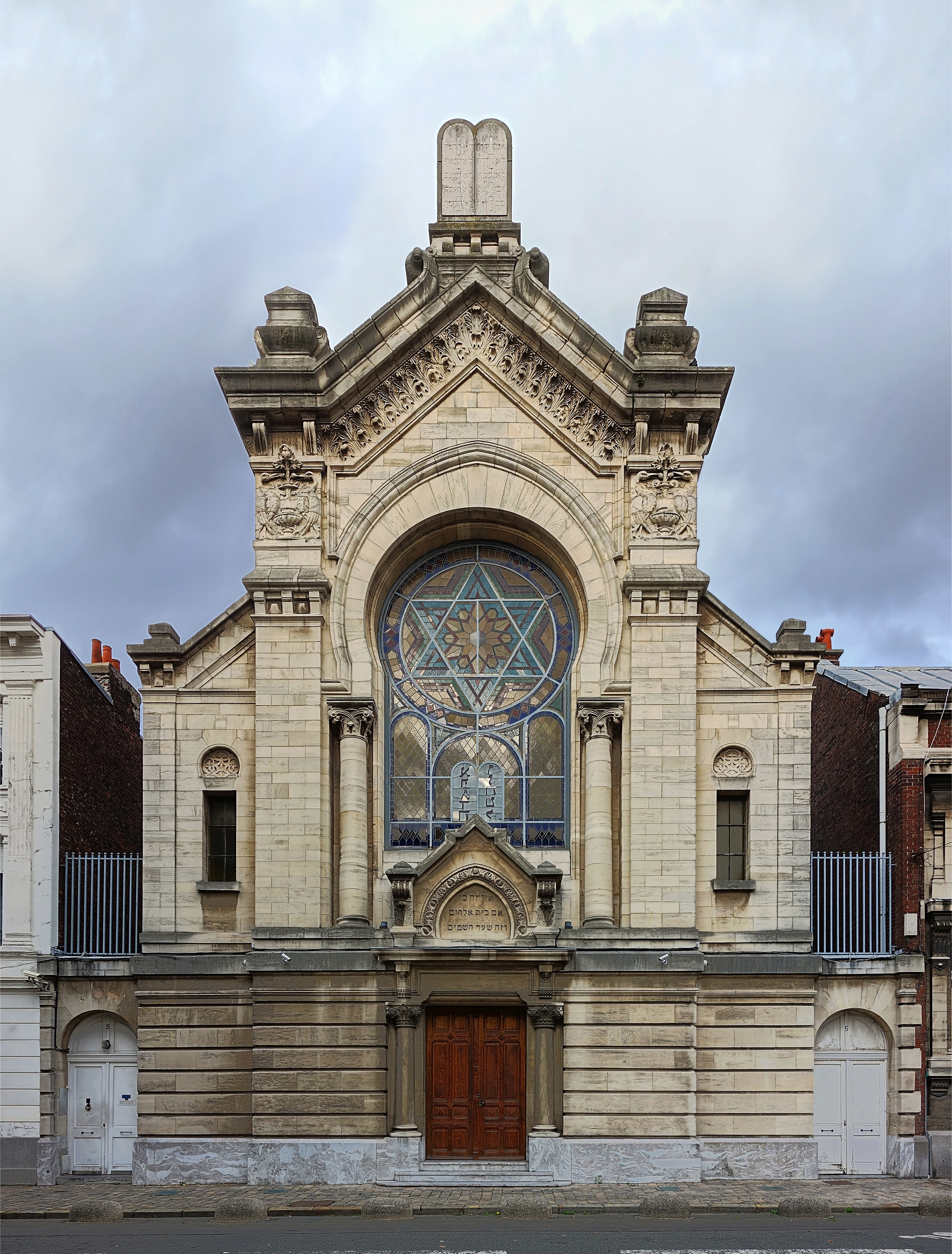
Lille Synagogue, France, 1891, elements of Romanesque, classical (guttae), "Moorish" and other styles

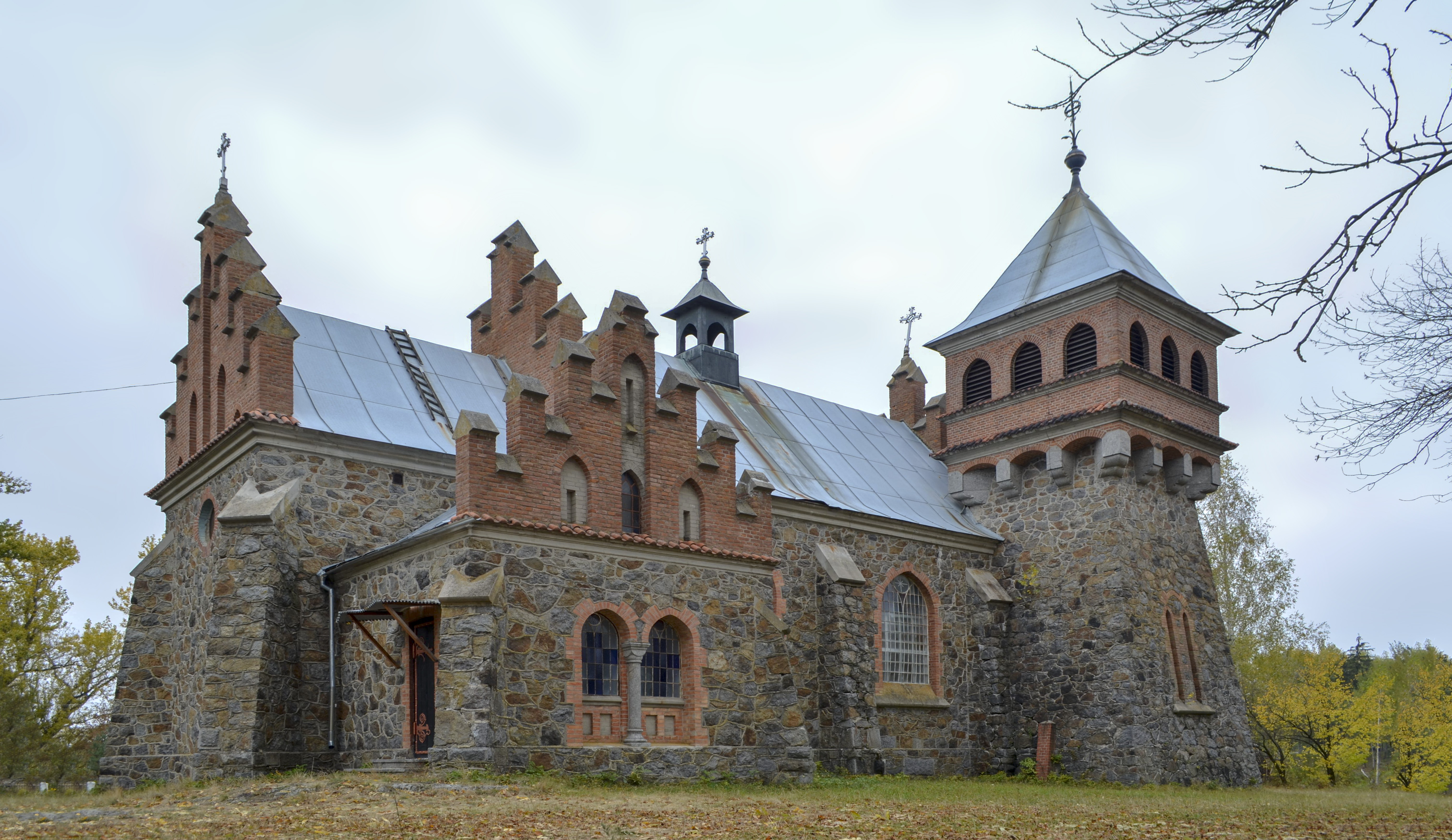
Church of St. Clare, Horodkivka, Ukraine, built 1910–1913, blending elements of neo-Gothic and modern twentieth century architecture

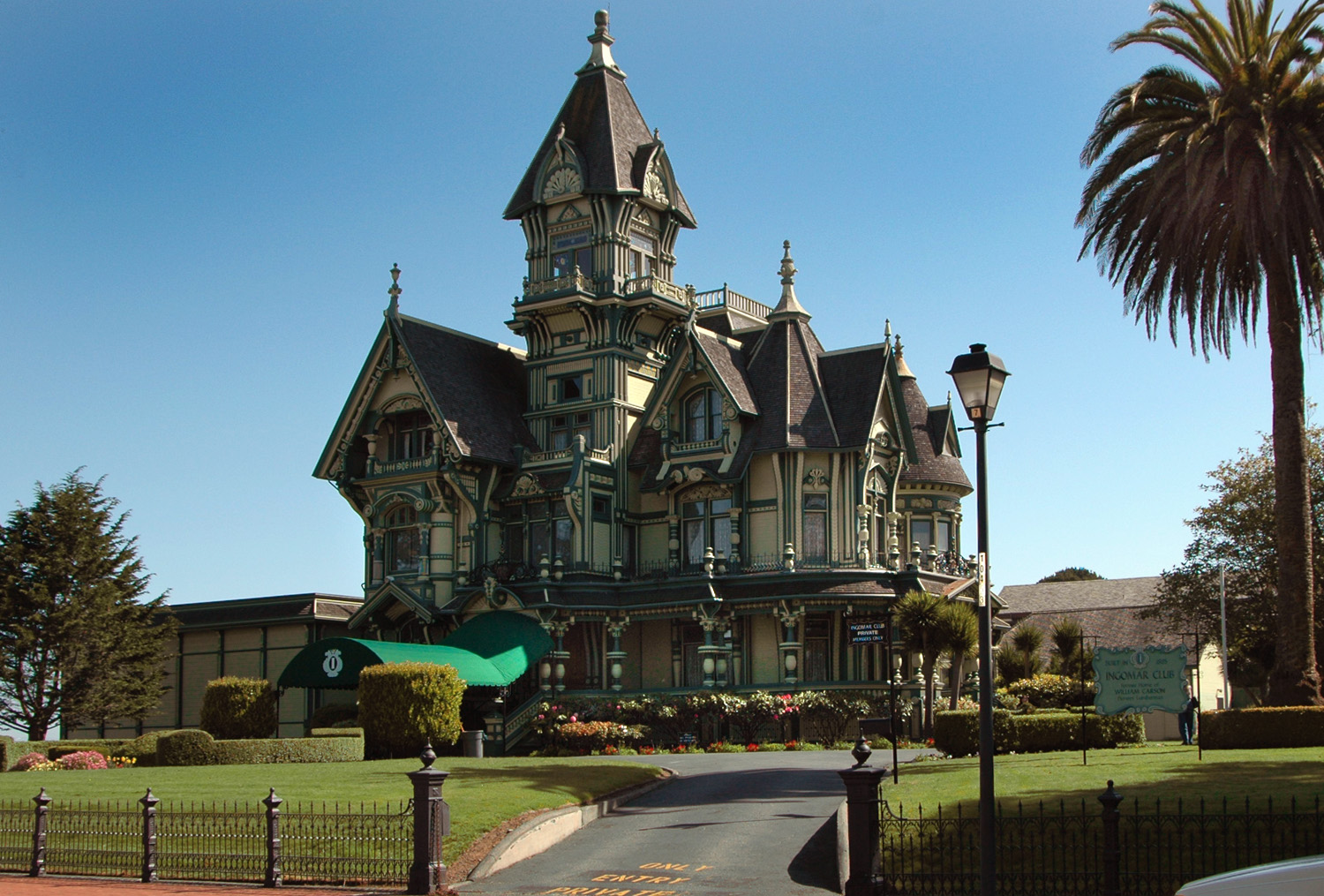
The Carson Mansion, Eureka, California in a style called Queen Anne Revival architecture.

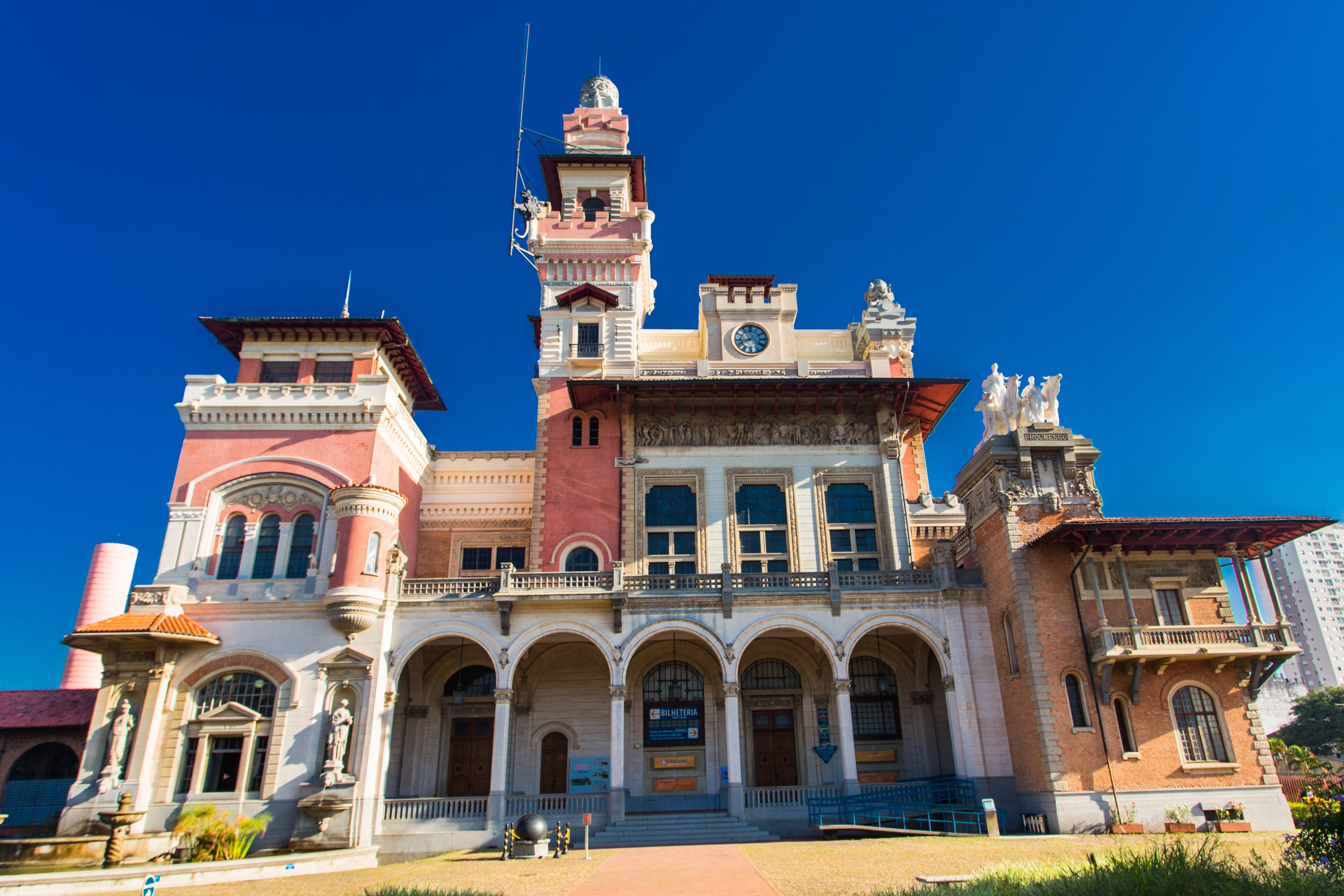
Palácio das Indústrias, São Paulo, Brazil

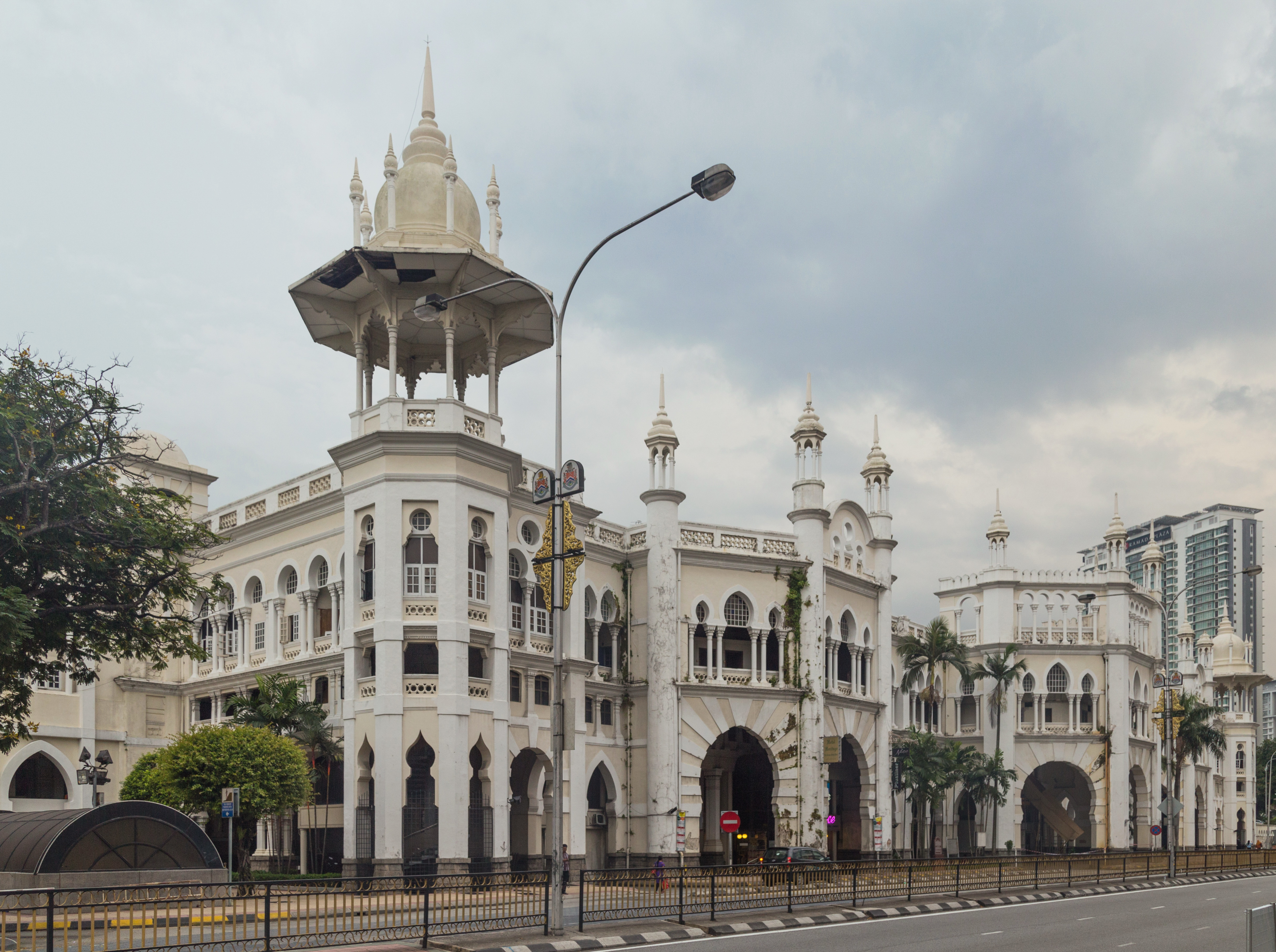
Indo-Saracenic Revival architecture: Kuala Lumpur Railway Station, Malaysia, by Arthur Benison Hubback, 1910

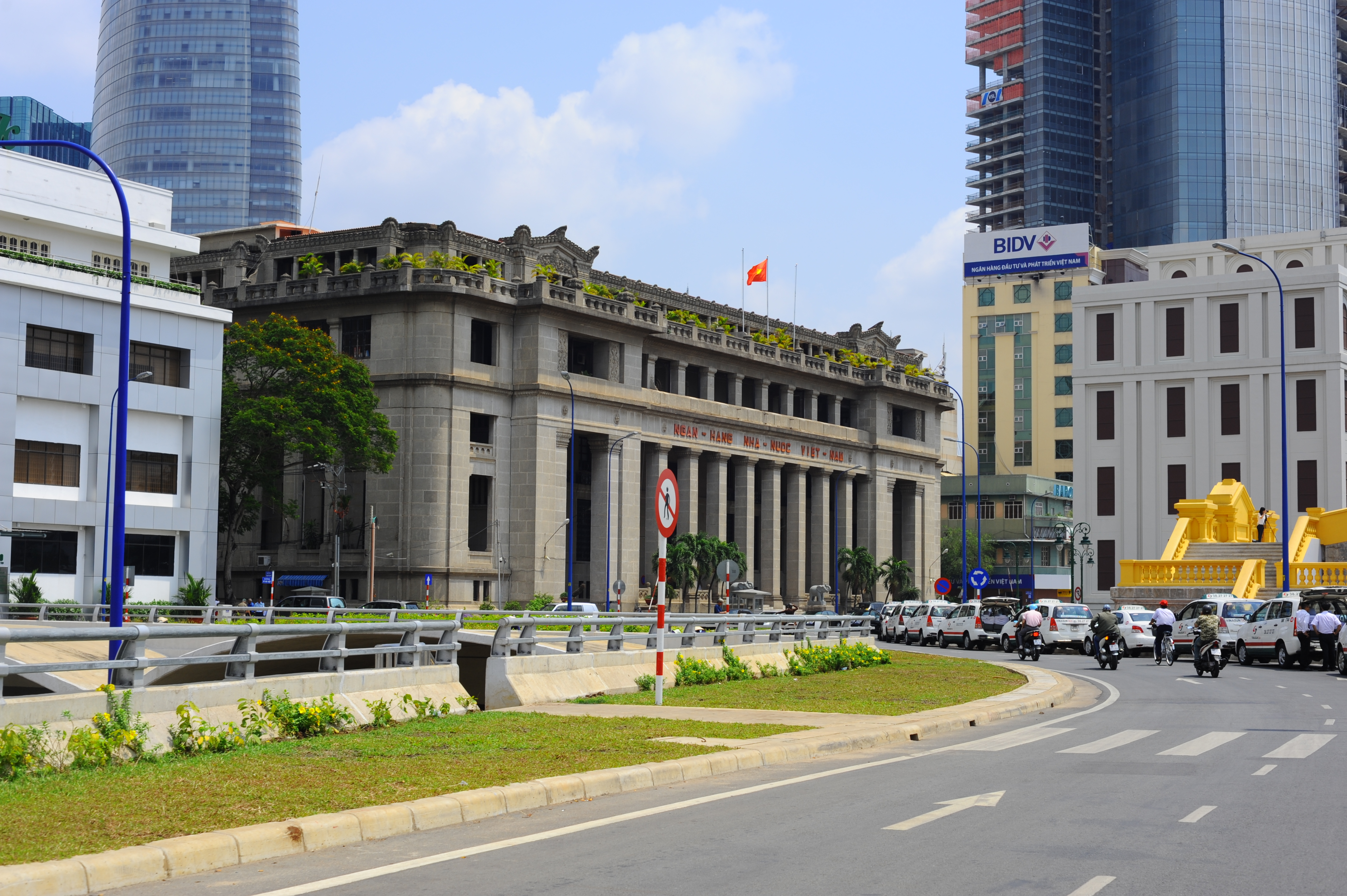
French colonial style with Angkorian elements: Banque de l'Indochine (now State Bank of Vietnam) building, Ho Chi Minh City, Vietnam, by Felix Dumail, 1929.

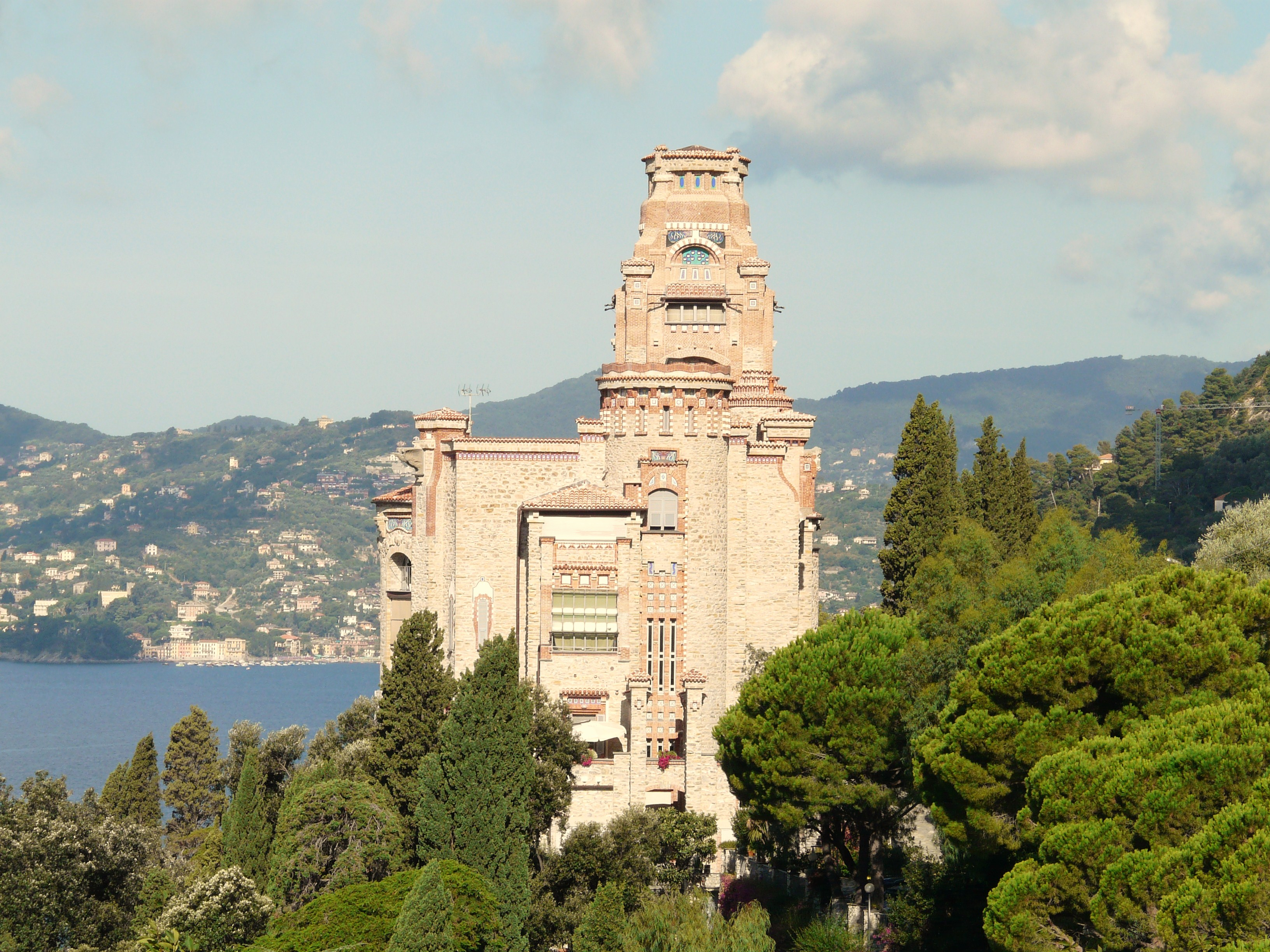
Sem Benelli Castle, Zoagli, Italy

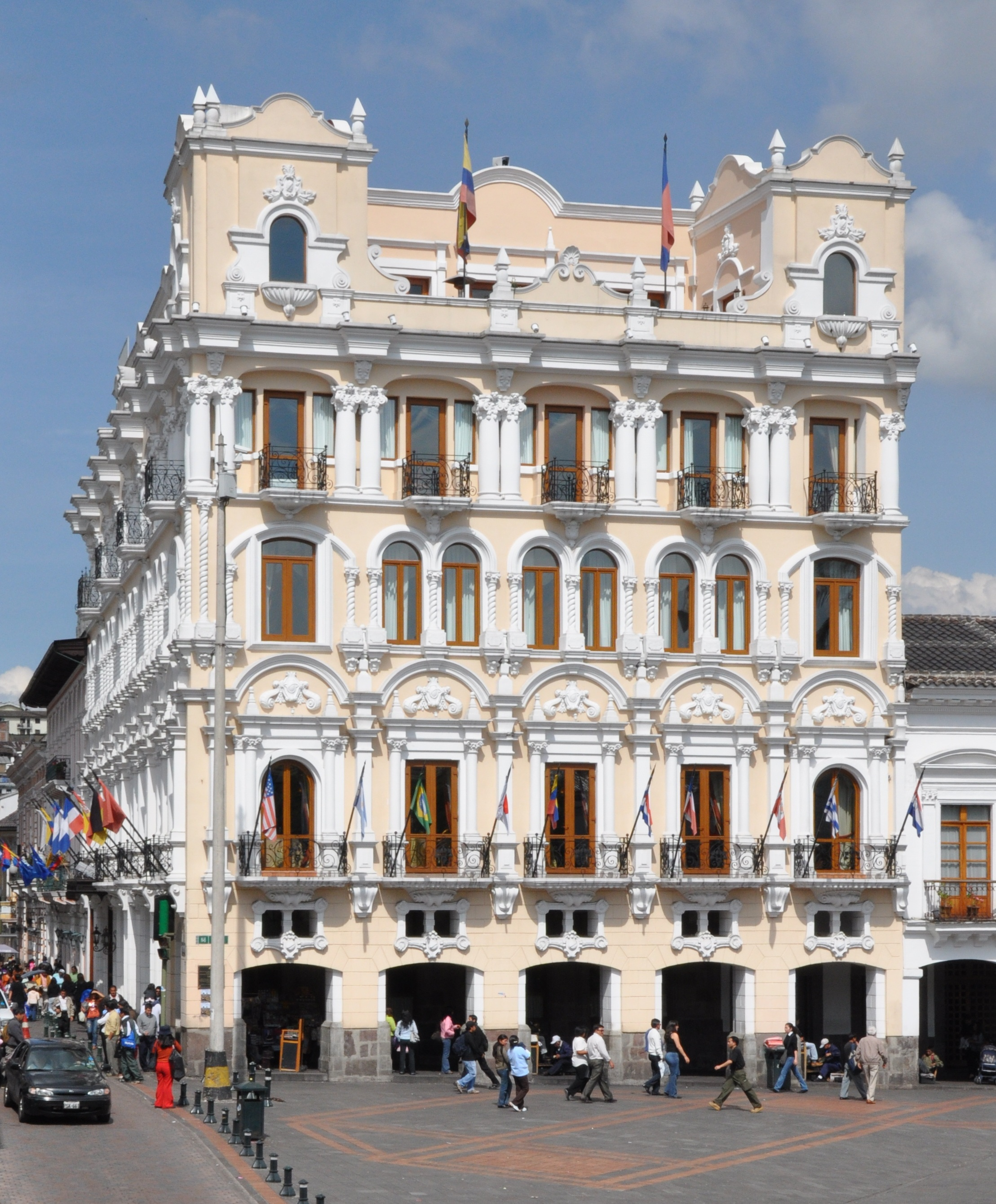
Palace of Pizarro, Quito, Ecuador, by Antonio Russo, 1930

=== Europe ===
Eclectic architecture first appeared across continental Europe in various countries such as France (Beaux-Arts architecture), England (Victorian architecture) and Germany (Gründerzeit), in response to the growing push amongst architects to have more expressive freedom over their work.

The École des Beaux-Arts in Paris, considered to be one of the first professional architectural schools, trained students in a rigorous and academic manner, equipping them with skills and professional prestige. Teachers at the École were some of the leading architects in France, and this new method of teaching was so successful, that it attracted students from across the globe. Many of the graduates went on to become pioneers of the movement, and used their Beaux-Arts training as a foundation for new eclectic designs.

Whilst the practise of this style of architecture was widespread (and could be seen in many town halls constructed at the time), eclecticism in Europe did not achieve the same level of enthusiasm that was seen in America – as it was assumed that the presence of old, authentic architecture, reduced the appeal of historical imitation in new buildings.

=== North America ===
The end of the 19th century saw a profound shift in North American Architecture. Architects educated at the École des Beaux-Arts in Paris, such as Richard Morris Hunt and Charles Follen McKim were responsible for bringing the beaux-arts approach back from Europe, which was said to be the cornerstone of eclectic architecture in North America. At a time of increasing prosperity and commercial pride, many eclectic buildings were commissioned in large cities around the US. The style thrived, as it introduced historical features, previously only seen in the aristocratic architecture of European countries such as Britain and France, contributing to a richer sense of culture and history within the US. In the case of Hunt and many other eclectic architects, his 'typically eclectic viewpoint' enabled him to make stylistic choices based on whatever suited the particular project or the client. This flexibility to adapt, and to blend freely between styles gave eclectic designers more appeal to clients.

The creation of skyscrapers and other large public spaces such as churches, courthouses, city halls, public libraries and movie theatres, meant that eclectic design was no longer only for members of high-society, but was also accessible to the general public. While some of these buildings have since been demolished (including the original Pennsylvania station and the first Madison Square garden—both in New York City), projects that remain from this era are still valued as some of the most important structures in the US.

=== Spread ===
Some of the most extreme examples of eclectic design could be seen onboard ocean liners (which at the time were the primary form of overseas transport). The lavish interiors were crafted with a mix of traditional styles—in an attempt to ease the discomfort of months abroad and to create the illusion of established grandeur.

At a similar time, such vessels were being used to transport colonists to undeveloped areas of the world. The colonisation of such areas, further spread the Eclectic architecture of the western world, as newly settled colonists built structures commonly featuring Roman classicism and Gothic motifs.

To a lesser extent, Eclecticism appeared across Asia, as Japanese and Chinese architects who had trained at American Beaux-Arts influenced schools, returned to produce eclectic designs across Asia such as the Bank of Japan (1895) by Tatsuno Kingo. The so-called Indo-Saracenic Revival architecture, which added details from traditional Indian architecture, mostly Mughal architecture, to essentially Western forms of public buildings and palaces, was an inherently eclectic style. Most of the architects were British.

=== Critical reception ===
As a style that offered so much creative freedom, and no guiding rules, the risk of creating an unsuccessful design was apparent to all. Projects that failed to harmoniously blend the different styles were subject to criticism from professionals (particularly those who opposed the movement).

=== Decline ===
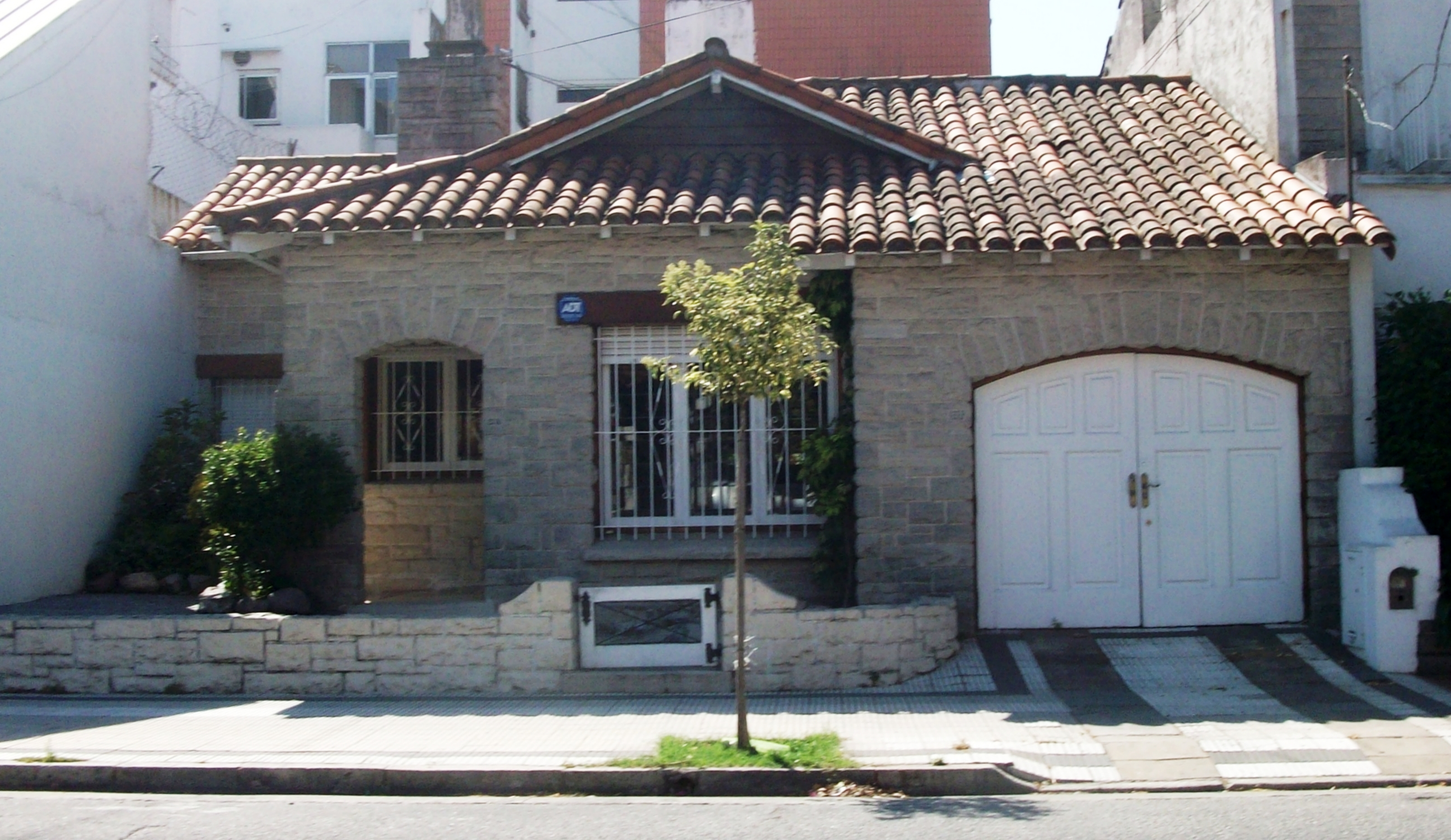
A Mar del Plata style house in Mar del Plata, Argentina, featuring some characteristics of the cottage, Norman architecture, and Spanish colonial architecture

Enthusiasm for historical imitation began to decline in the 1930s and eclecticism was phased out in the curriculums of design schools, in favour of a new style. The shift towards Late Modernism, Postmodernism, Brutalism, Art Deco and Streamline Moderne was significant as it was seen by many as avant-garde and the new technology and materials being produced at the time allowed for greater innovation. Despite the move away from eclecticism, the era still remains historically significant as it "re-opened the doors to innovation and new forms" for architecture in the following years.

== Interior design ==
The rise in eclectic architecture created a need for interior specialists who had the skill, understanding and knowledge of past historical styles, to produce suitable accompanying interiors. This resulted in the emergence of interior designer as a regarded profession. Prominent interior designers in this era (between the late 19th and early 20th century) include Elsie De Wolfe, Rose Cumming, Nancy McClelland, Elsie Cobb Wilson, Francis Elkins, Surie Maugham and Dorothy Draper. Whilst the clientele of these early designers consisted exclusively of wealthy families and businesses, the works of such decorators were regularly featured in popular publications such as House and Garden, House Beautiful, and the Ladies Home Journal. Publishing the lavish interiors of these magnificent homes helped to spread the eclectic style to the middle classes, and less extravagant imitations or the incorporation of similar decorative elements became a desirable feature in domestic decoration. Aesthetic preferences varied from region to region across America, with Spanish styles being favoured in California, and elements of American Colonial architecture being popular in New England.

== Contemporary context ==
In contemporary society, styles that draw from many different cultural and historical styles are loosely described as "eclectic" though references to eclectic architecture within literature and media are usually about buildings constructed within the eclectic movement of the late 19th-early 20th century period.

== Eclectic architects ==
- Daniel Burnham
- Alexander Jackson Davis
- William Rutherford Mead
- Richard Norman Shaw
- Stanford White

== See also ==
- Eclecticism in art
- Historicism (art)
- Neo-eclectic architecture
- Ottoman architecture in the 19th–20th centuries
