= Domenico Canale =

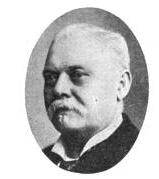
- Canale in 1911
- Born: Domenico Canale; January 16, 1843; San Pietro di Rovereto, Italy
- Died: 1919; Memphis, Tennessee
- Other names: Dominic, D. Canale
- Occupations: business owner, entrepreneur, produce wholesaler, beer and liquor distributor

Domenico 'Dominic' Canale (born in 1843), also known as D. Canale, was an Italian-American immigrant who founded the D. Canale & Co. distributorship in Memphis, Tennessee that became the largest distributor of produce throughout the Southern United States and the primary beer distributor for the Mid-South region.

== Italian Heritage ==
Domenico was from San Pietro di Rovereto, a community within the municipality of Zoagli along the Italian Riviera, approximately 40 km southeast of Genoa. The son of Giovanni Canale and A. Vaccaro, Domenico sailed to America in February 1859 at sixteen years old. He landed in New Orleans after a 65-day voyage, and boarded the steamboat John Simon up the Mississippi River and settled in Memphis, Tennessee.

== "Self-Made Man" ==
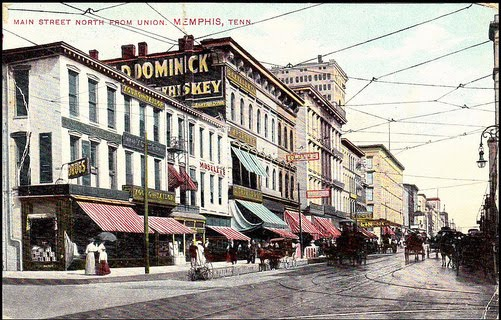
D. Canale Storefront on Main Street in Memphis, TN.

Soon after arriving in Memphis in May 1859, Domenico began working for his uncle, who ran a thriving wholesale liquor business. In 1866, Domenico saved up enough money to start up his own produce distribution business, "D. Canale & Co.," which grew considerably throughout the Southern United States as he imported fruits from around the world. The company also packaged and distributed a fine bourbon whiskey called “Old Dominick,” and a number of beers including Pabst Blue Ribbon and Champagne Velvet. It was a natural extension for a produce house to distribute beer, since beer at that time was not pasteurized, and produce houses had refrigeration.

Liquor and beer sales ended during Prohibition, but once the law was repealed, the company shifted its interest to the distribution of beer and produce only. Through the next several years, D. Canale & Co. became the largest produce distributor in the South.

The Southern Historical Association's 1905 book, Notable Men of Tennessee, which profiled prominent Tennesseans at the turn of the 20th century, observed that "Mr. Canale is what is rightly termed a self-made man, and has won his position in the social and commercial life of Memphis by his industry, his native ability and the exercise of correct business principles." In 1869, D. Canale married Catherine Solari (1850–1923), the sister of Mary Solari, the famous Italian-American painter and first woman admitted to the Accademia di Belle Arti in Florence, Italy. Catherine and Domenico had eight children (5 sons and 3 daughters): John D., Andrew, Anthony, James, Annie (Welsh), Ester (Hoffman), Catherine, and George. Notable Men of Tennessee also remarked that "[Domenico] is prouder of having rightly reared eight children than he is of his splendid success in business."

== D. Canale & Co. in the Modern Era ==
D. Canale & Co. Modern Storefront

Following Domenico's death in 1919, the D. Canale & Co. passed down to Domenico's eldest son, John D., and then to John D. Canale Jr. In 1956, D. Canale & Co. sold the produce division, and the company entered the institutional food business. In 1965, a restaurant material business was added, and another food broker was acquired, making D. Canale a force in the institutional food business with distribution in a five-state area.

In 1982, the food and beer business was spun off from the parent company and D. Canale Food Services and D. Canale Beverages were formed. John D. Canale III became president of Food Services and Chris W. Canale became Chairman of D. Canale Beverages. In 1999, D. Canale Food Services was sold to Sara Lee.

D. Canale Beverages, with a payroll of over 200 employees, sold over 5 million cases of Anheuser-Busch products annually and had a gross revenue of $80 million in 2009. Over many decades, it was the primary beer distributor for the Mid-South.

In September 2010, D. Canale & Co. sold its beer-distributing business to the Hand Family Beverage Company of Clarksville, TN. D. Canale, a staple of the Mid-South economy for 144 years as one of the oldest businesses in Memphis, is now known as Hand Family Beverage dba Budweiser of Memphis.

== Gallery ==
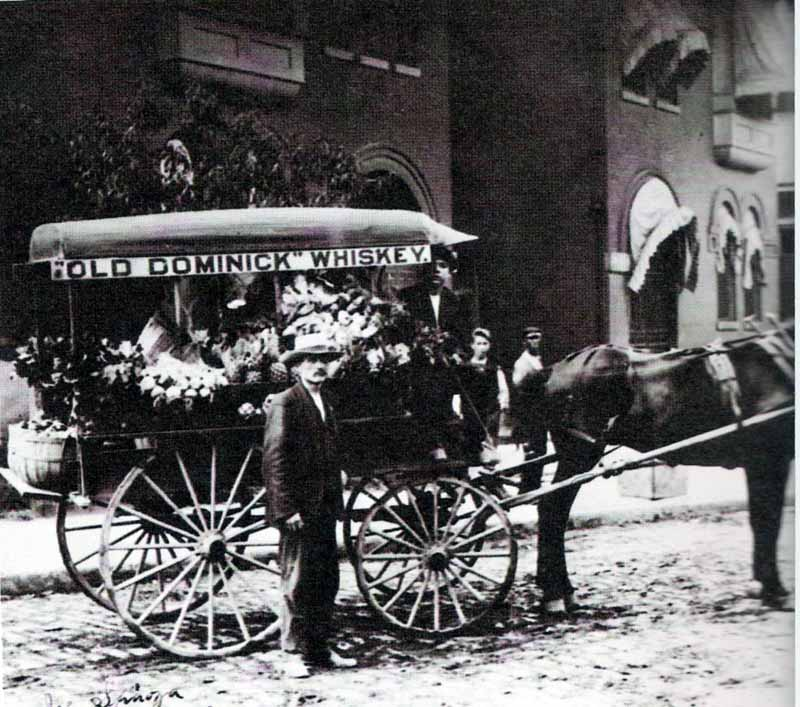
D. Canale and Co. Produce Wagon - 1907

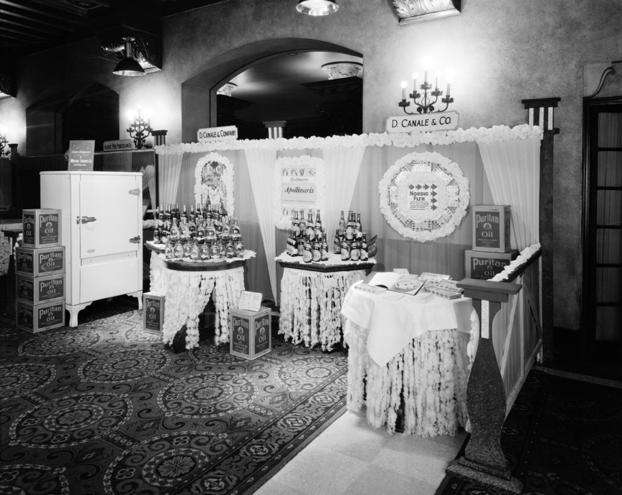
D. Canale Exhibit

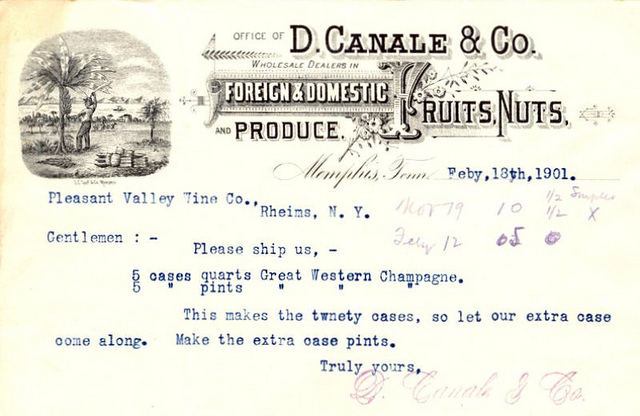
Shipment order from D. Canale & Co.

== Canale's Markets ==
George Canale, a well-known fruit dealer in his own right, opened a chain of 10 Canale's Park & Shop Markets selling produce, vegetables and fruit inside 10 Sunset Meat Market locations across Memphis: Monroe and Third (the first, opening May 8, 1924), Front and Washington, Curb Market, 1089 Union Av., 1645 Union Av., 183 S. Cooper, 1797 Walker Av,. 295 E. McLemore, 1140 Mississippi, and 400 N. Waldran.

== Additional Information ==
- History of Memphis, Tennessee
- List of Italian-American business people
- Mary Solari
- Canale Arena
