= Church of St. Clare, Horodkivka =

Coordinates: 49°53′57.05″N 28°59′2.3″E

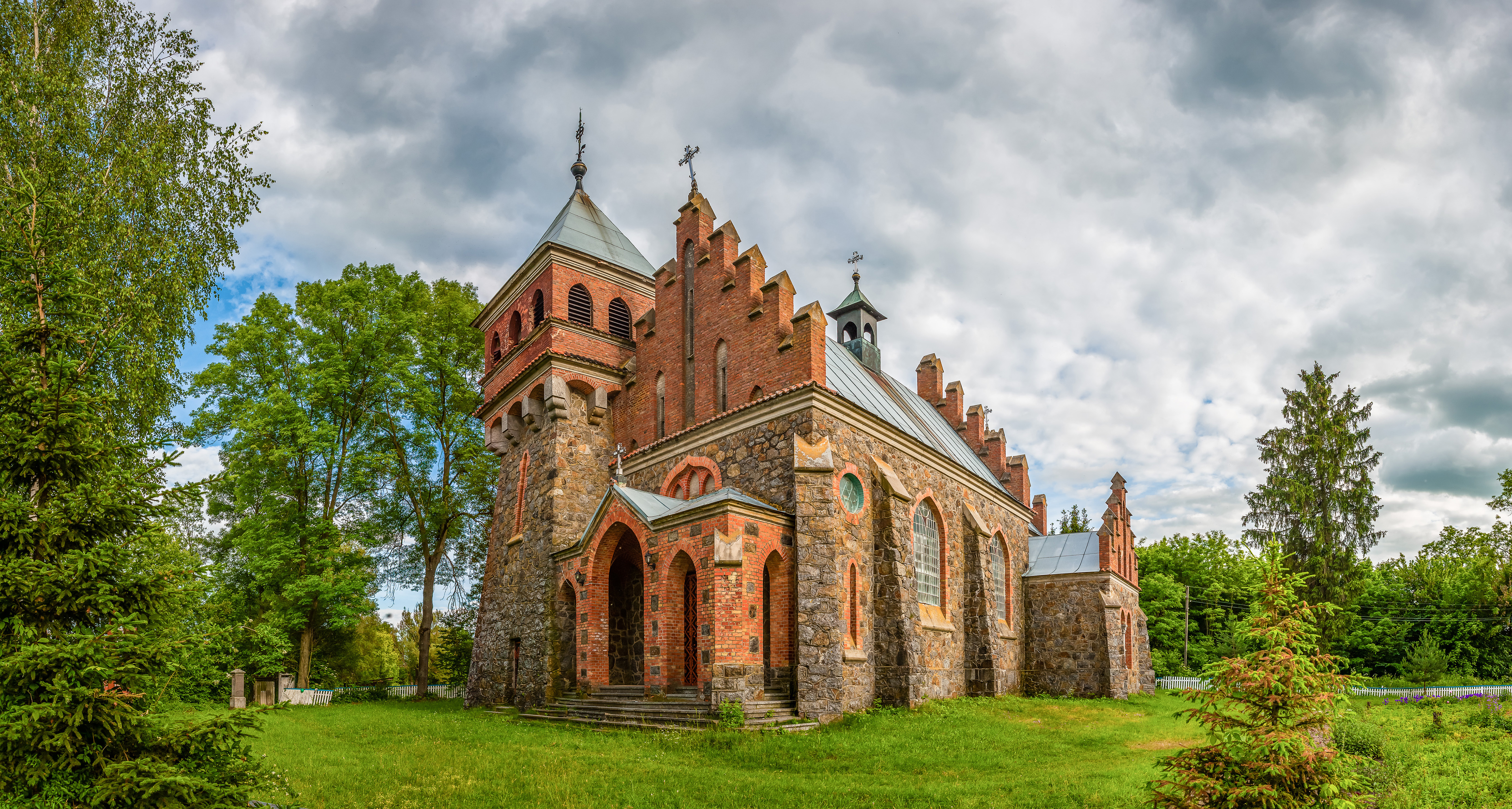

- Location within Ukraine Zhytomyr Oblast (country map)
- Location: Horodkivka, Berdychiv Raion, Zhytomyr Oblast
- Country: Ukraine
- Denomination: Roman Catholic

Architecture
- Style: Eclectic
- Groundbreaking: 1910
- Completed: 1913

The Church of St. Clare, Horodkivka (Ukrainian: Костел Святої Клари) is a Roman Catholic religious building and an architectural monument of local significance in the village of Horodkivka (alternative spelling Gorodkivka), Berdychiv Raion, Zhytomyr Oblast, Ukraine. Horodkivka was called Khalaimgorodok before 1946.

The church overlooks a small lake in the southwestern part of Horodok, near the road leading to Berdichev, on the low bank of the river Lebedivka. It is constructed in an eclectic style with elements of neo-Gothic and modern twentieth century architecture.

== Origins ==
The Polish writer-memoirist Eustachy Antoni Iwanowski, who wrote under the name Hellenius, was born in the village on 17 January 1813; he lived in the village for almost all his life and was a devout Roman Catholic, making numerous pilgrimages. His mother Klara Iwanowska died in 1859, and he inherited estates in Halaimgorodok, as well as the desire to build a church to honour St. Clare, the patron saint of his mother. He was, however, unable to obtain the necessary permission from the Russian authorities, who brutally repressed the Polish nobility in response to the armed uprisings of 1831 and of 1863.

Iwanowski died on 7 July 1903, and it was left to his heirs, villagers 54-year-old Anna and 60-year-old Romuald Żmigrodzki, to fulfil Iwanowski's last wishes and build the church.

A stone chapel had already been built in the village in 1818 by Mr. Michalovsky (Міхаловським), with the permission of the diocesan authorities. On the site of this chapel, between 1910 and 1913, the Church of St. Clare was constructed by Polish builders, together with inhabitants of the village and of the neighbouring village of Zherdeli, under the direction of the builder E. Yablonsky and technologist A. Khodak.

The church was built in the style of a mediaeval castle or manor house using stone and brick and the roof was of Polish red tiles. The belfry had three bells, the largest of which weighed 150 kg. The doors were massive and forged and the windows were glazed with colored stained glass, there were wall paintings, and a crystal chandelier hung in the middle of the sanctuary. The acoustics were excellent.

== History ==
In 1935 under the communist government in Soviet Ukraine, the Khalaimgorod parish ceased to exist and the church was used as a village club. They removed the bells from the bell tower, and the statue of the Mother of God at the entrance was knocked down from the base and thrown into the lake. Amateur performances took place in the church.

During the Second World War, after the establishment of the German occupying power in the village, the religious life of the parish was restored under Father Joseph Kozinsky and worship was conducted from 1943 to 1959. However, in 1961, after the return of Soviet power, the building was returned to secular use as a collective farm barn by decision of the Zhytomyr Oblast Executive Committee, and the organ and wall paintings were destroyed.

In 1989, the church was transferred back to the Roman Catholic community of Carmelites. At the expense of the community, the building has been restored, including the belfry, and the surroundings have been planted with flowers. The church now has several local icons, an antique harpsichord and a relic of Pope John Paul II, and is an active church in the Ruzhin Deanery of the Roman Catholic Diocese of Kyiv-Zhytomyr.

The building is now well known as a local landmark and generates interest as a tourist attraction. A special celebration is held each year on August 11.

== Gallery ==
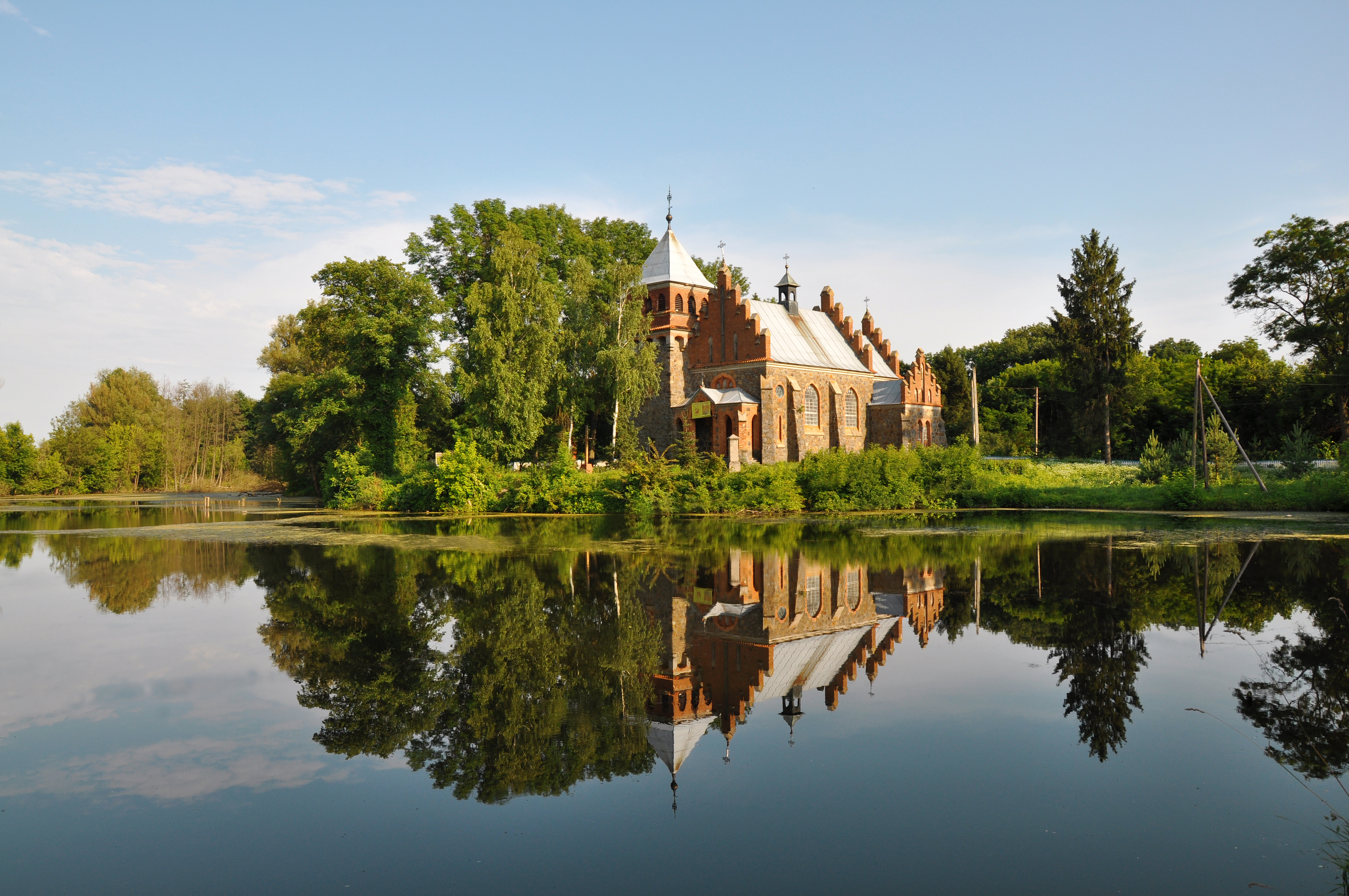

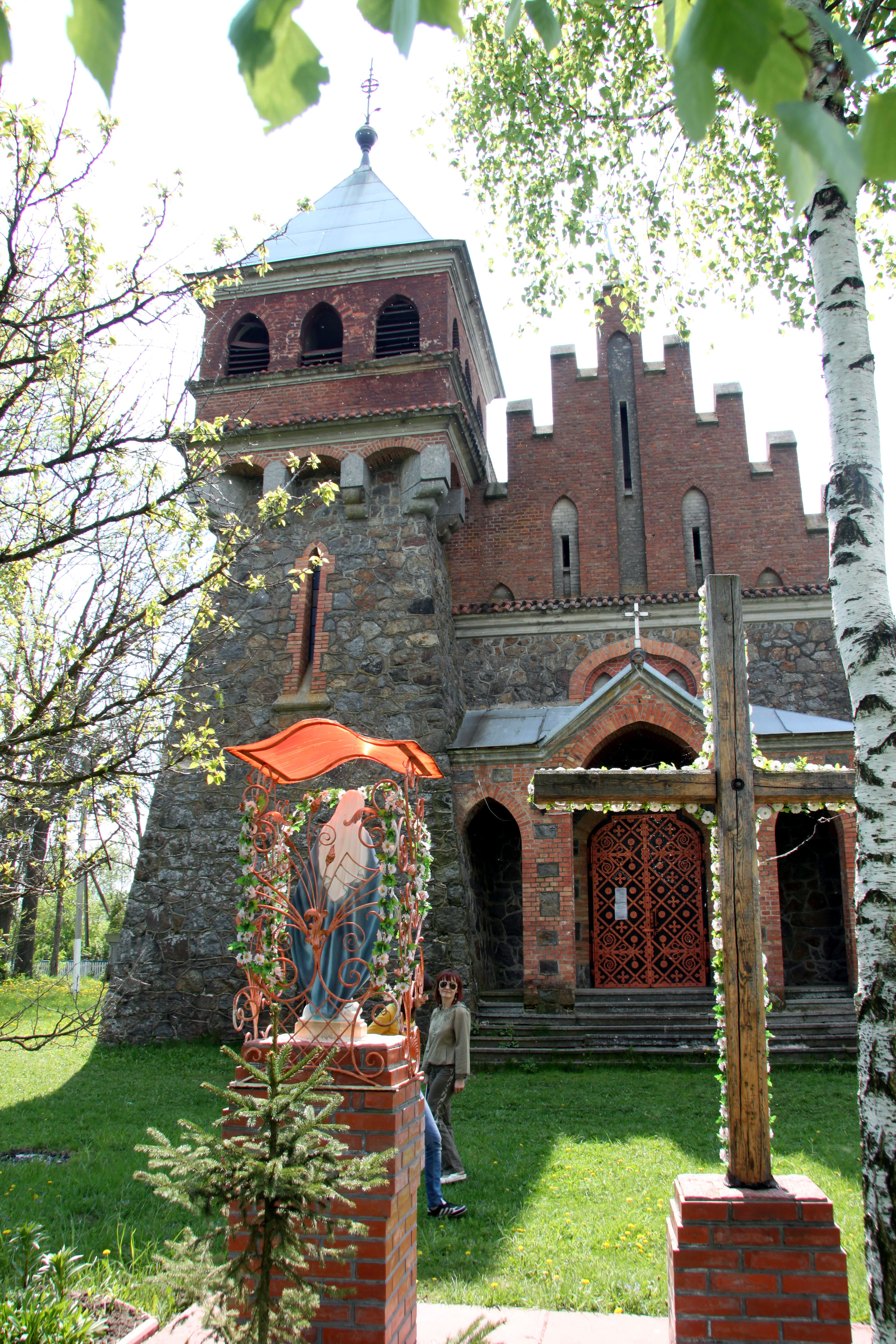

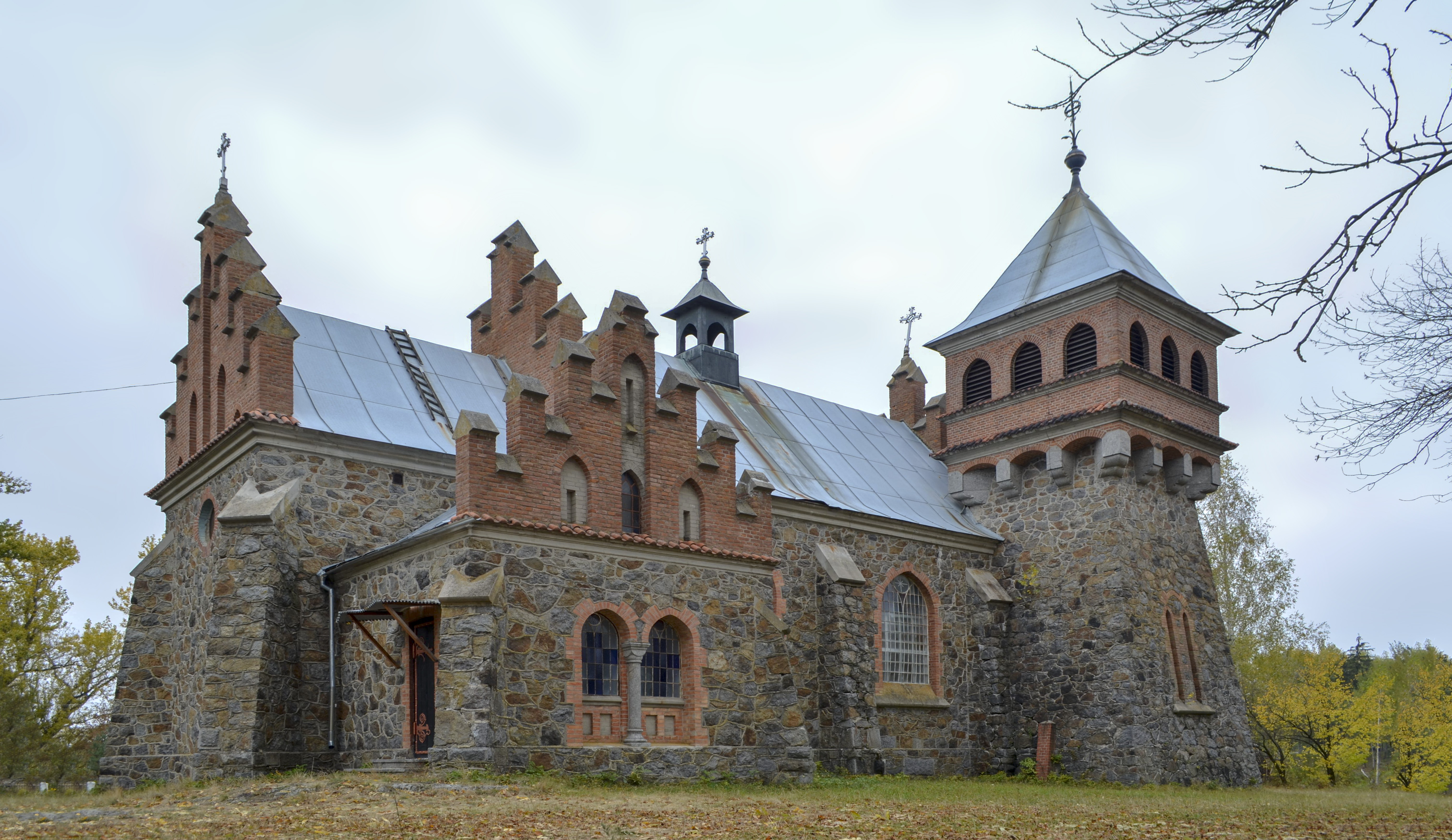

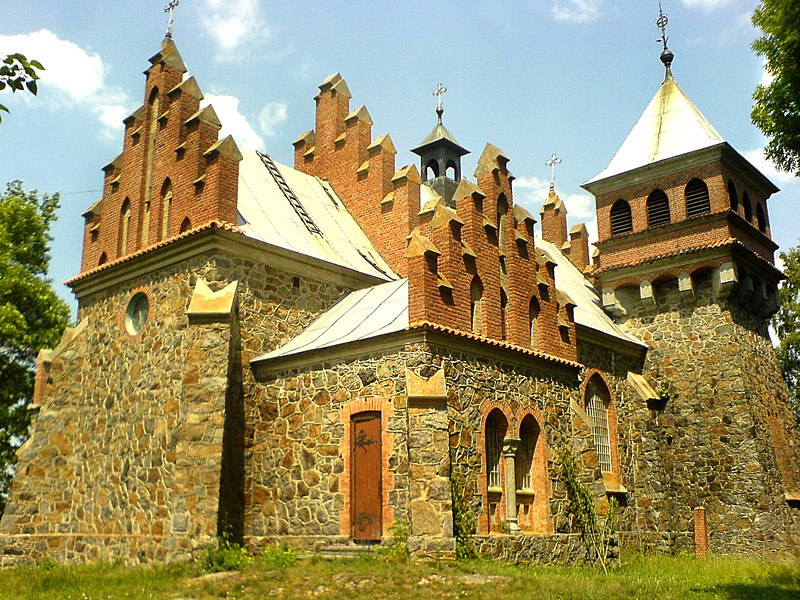
