= Sem Benelli Castle =

- Castello Sem Benelli (Italian)
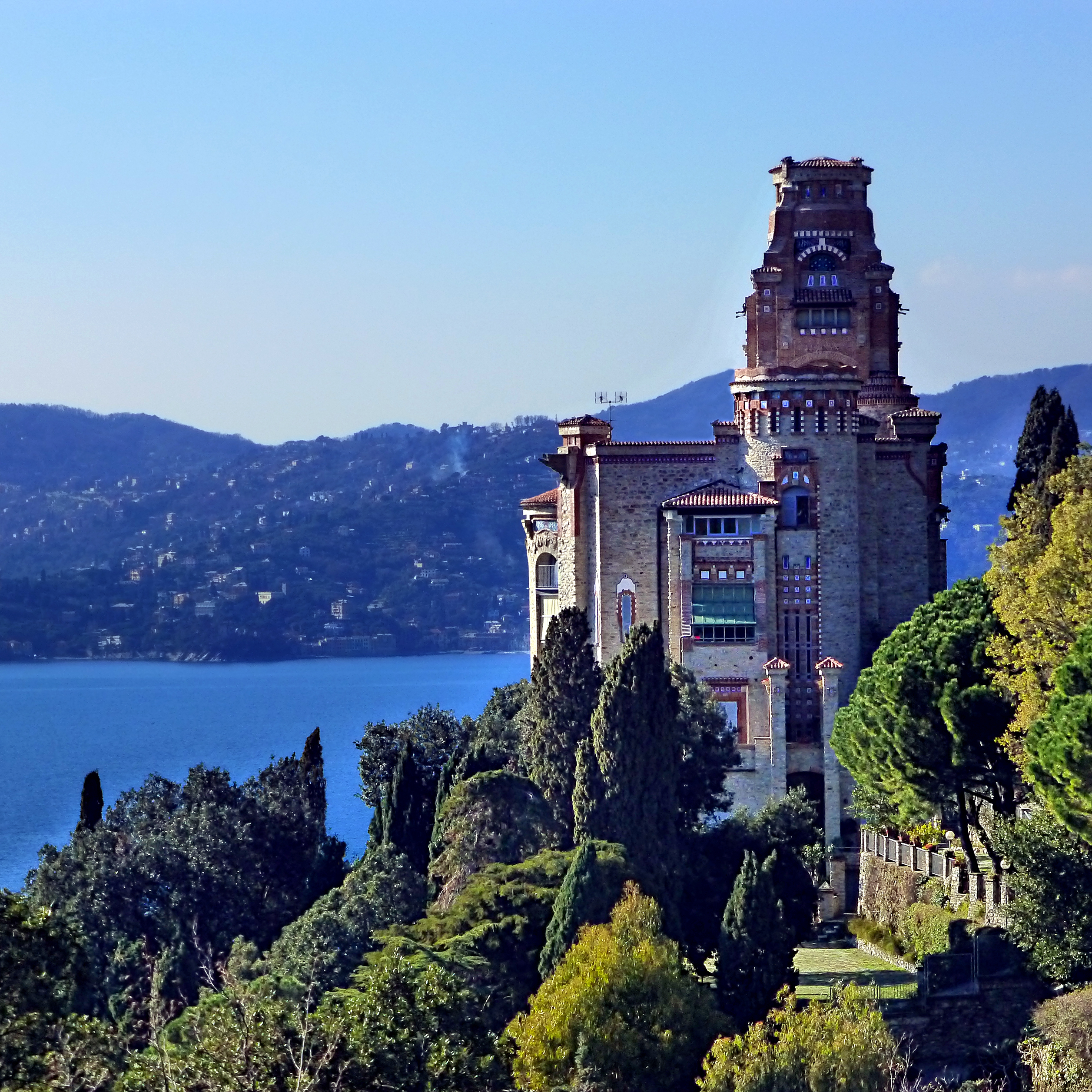
- Sem Benelli Castle in 2013
- Click on the map for a fullscreen view

General information
- Location: Zoagli, Italy
- Coordinates: 44°20′01.51″N 9°16′26.46″E

The Sem Benelli Castle (Italian: Castello Sem Benelli) is a historic villa located in Zoagli, Italy.

== History ==
The building was commissioned in 1914 by the playwright and poet Sem Benelli. The project was entrusted to the set designer and architect Gian Giuseppe Mancini, a friend of Benelli's. The poet purchased the land from a man named Giovannino delle Gallerie and financed the construction with the revenues from his theatrical works and from his own theatre company.

In 1943, due to financial difficulties, Benelli was forced to sell the property, which was purchased by the Milanese industrialist Costantino Lentati. Benelli nevertheless continued to live in the gardener's cottage until his death in 1949.

== Description ==
The villa stands on a rocky spur along the Via Aurelia and enjoys a panoramic view over the Gulf of Tigullio.

The building features an eclectic architectural style inspired by Neo-Medieval forms, with the use of exposed stone, bricks, and colored marble. The volumes are organized around a tall central tower.
