= San Pietro di Rovereto =

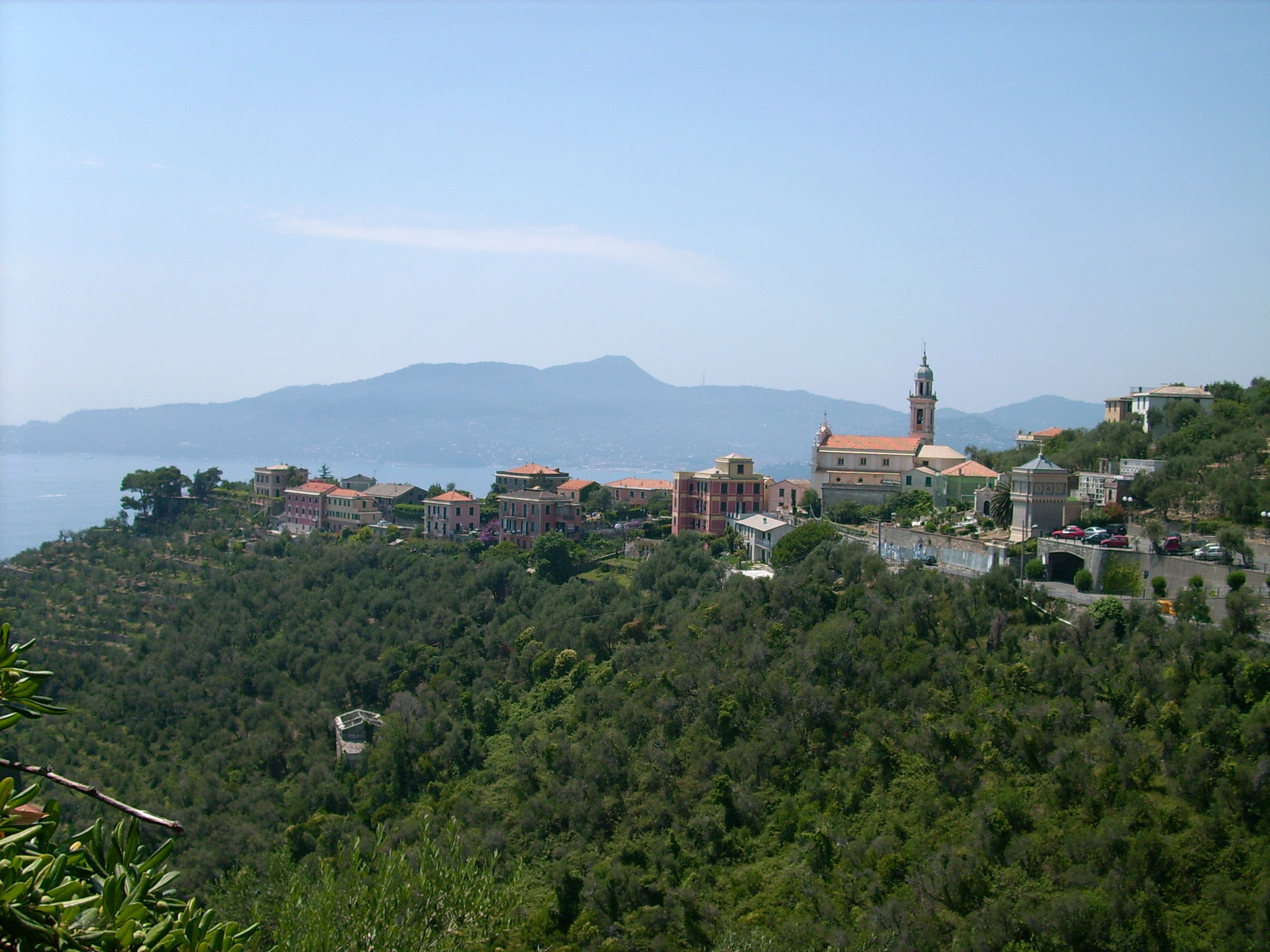

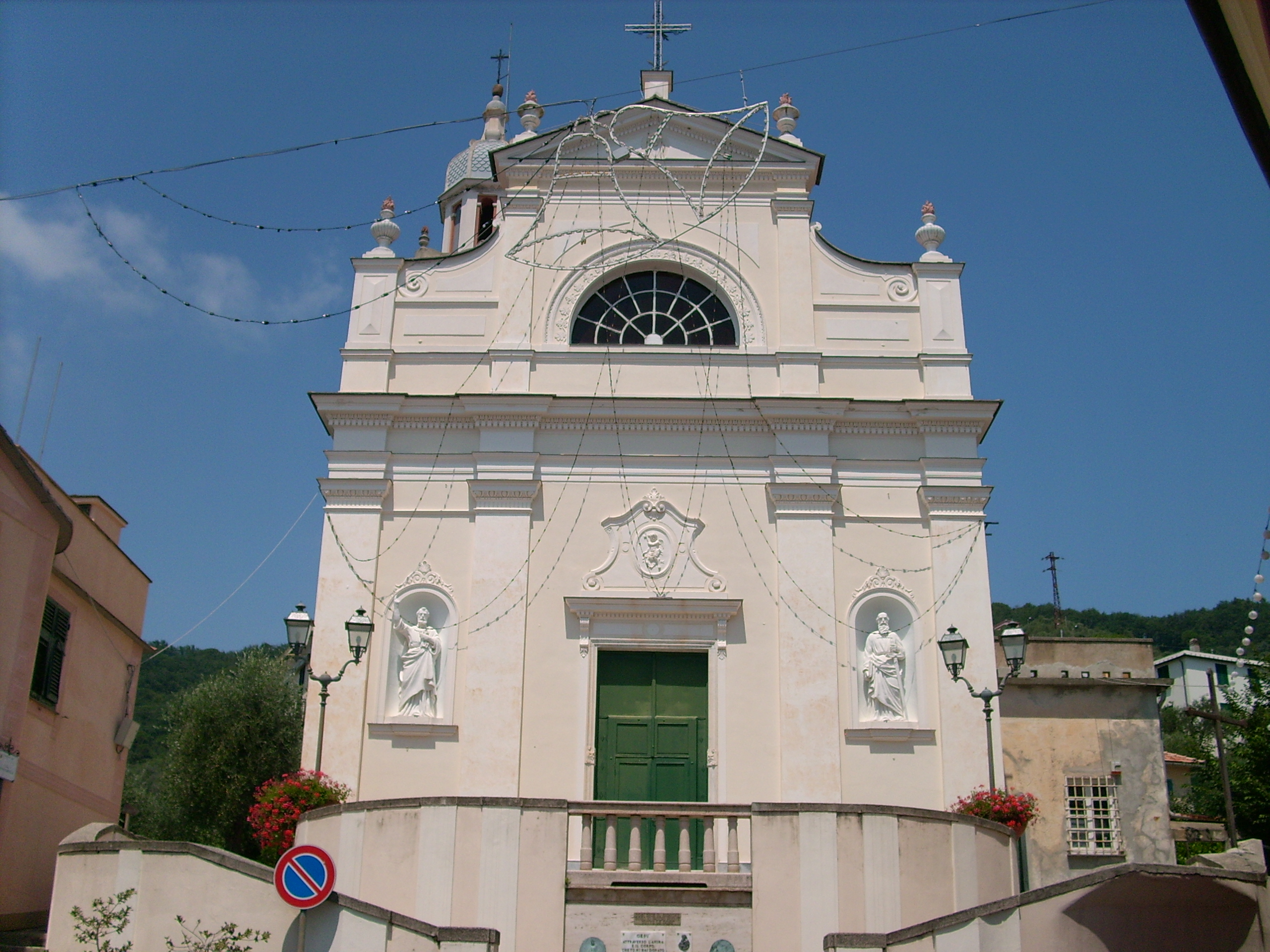
The church of St Peter

San Pietro di Rovereto is a village in Italy that lies on a ridge that descends to the Mediterranean Sea overlooking the Tigullio Gulf and the Promontory of Portofino, Liguria on the picturesque Italian Riviera. San Pietro is located in the municipality of Zoagli, within the province of Genova, Liguria region, and located approximately 40 kilometers Southeast of Genoa and situated between Rapallo and Portofino to the West and Chiavari to the East.

San Pietro di Rovereto comprises one of five villages of the Zoagli municipality, which are all connected by trail along the sea: San Pietro di Rovereto, San Pantaleo, Semorile, St. Ambrose and St. Martin.

== History ==
During the Roman Empire, San Pietro di Rovereto was a military district along the extended Via Aurelia (Aurelian Way) between Genoa and Rome. Remains of this period are on display in the village church of La Chiesa di San Pietro. Domenico Canale, an Italian-American immigrant who created a successful produce and beer distributorship throughout the Southeastern United States and headquartered in Memphis, Tennessee, was from San Pietro di Rovereto.

== Additional links ==
La Chiesa di San Pietro
