= Mary Solari =

American painter

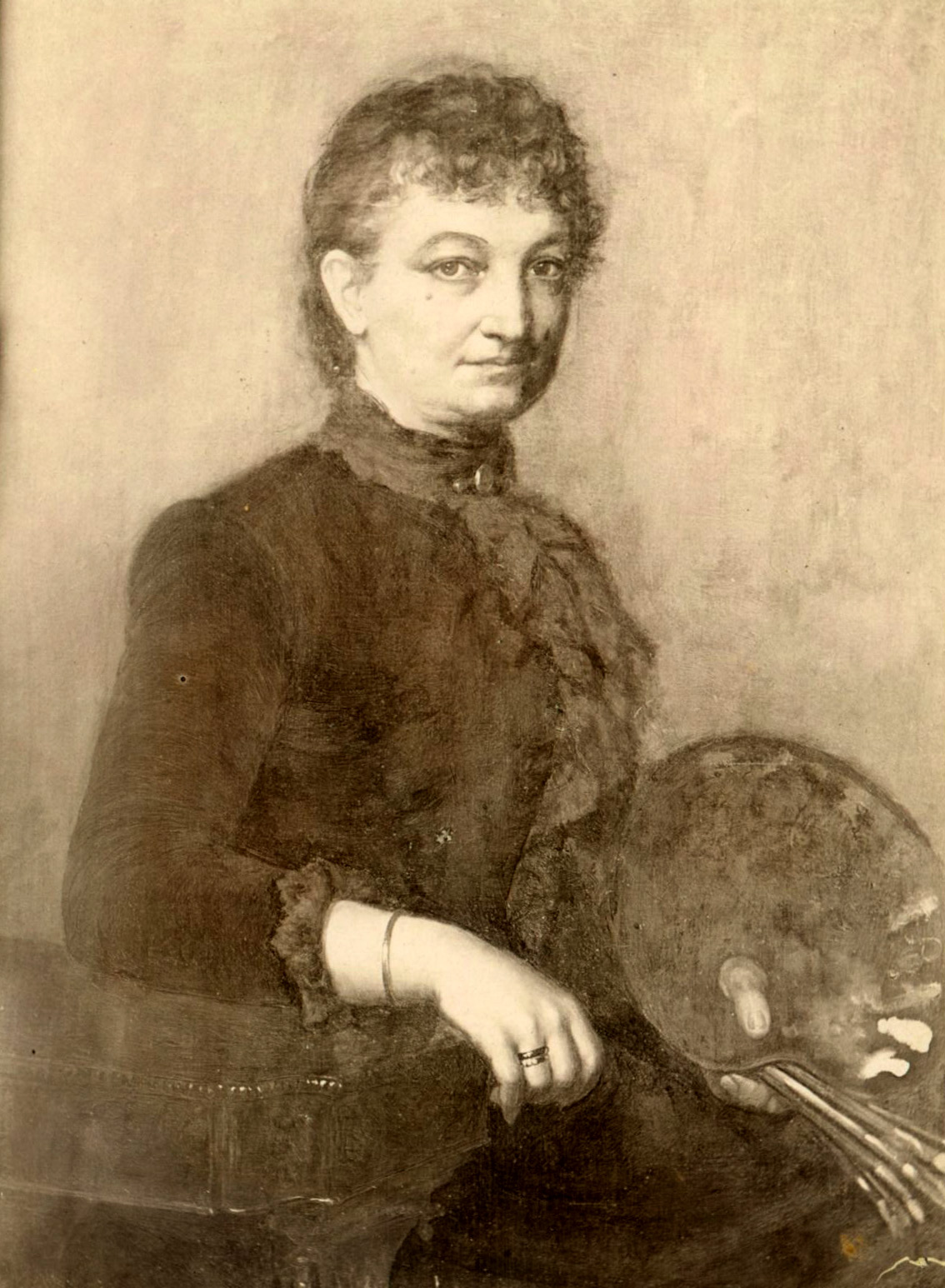
- Self-portrait of Mary Solari
- Born: Mary Magdalene Solari; January 11, 1849; Calvari, Italy
- Died: November 4, 1929 (aged 80); Memphis, Tennessee
- Education: Accademia di Belle Arti, Florence, Italy
- Occupation(s): artist, painter
- Style: figure, portrait, landscape

Mary Magdalene Solari (1849–1929) was an Italian-American artist well known for oil and watercolor paintings of figures and portraits.

== Italian influence ==
Mary Solari was born in Calvari, in the comune of San Colombano Certénoli, near Genoa, in Liguria, Italy. The Solari family moved to Memphis, Tennessee soon after her birth, and Mary began her education in the Memphis public schools. She returned to her native Italy in 1878 to escape the yellow fever epidemic and study art. In 1885, she became the first woman admitted to the Accademia di Belle Arti of Florence, where she earned nine medals and two master's degrees while learning to paint in the tradition of the old masters, such as Michelangelo Buonarroti, Francesco da Sangallo, Agnolo Bronzino, Benvenuto Cellini, Giorgio Vasari, Bartolomeo Ammannati, and Giambologna.

== Accolades ==
As a pioneer for women's art in Italy and America, she was the first woman admitted to the Accademia di Belle Arti, "Academy of Fine Arts", of Florence. Born in Italy and raised in Memphis, TN, Mary Solari participated as a contestant and judge at the 1893 World's Fair in Chicago (World's Columbian Exposition), where she was the only Southerner and woman on the panel of the international jury of award. Solari exhibited her work at the Woman's Building at the 1893 World's Fair. Her artwork was also displayed at the 1897 Tennessee Centennial, where she received first prize for oil painting, first and second prizes for watercolor, first prize for crayon, first prize for landscape, and first prize for overall collection. She also displayed her works at the 1904 St. Louis Exposition, where she was awarded multiple medals. She is renowned for her artwork, and considered one of the best artists from the State of Tennessee. In 1859, Mary's sister, Catherine Solari, married Domenico Canale, who later became a major alcohol and produce distributor throughout the Southern United States.

== Memphis years ==
After returning to Memphis in the early 1890s, she devoted her time to art instruction and art advocacy. Mary was an early proponent for an Art League, a city museum of art in Memphis, and a champion for art education in public schools. She was the author of influential articles on prison reform, criminal rehabilitation, and industrial training in the schools. Mary's ideas and influence were also responsible for major reform and renovation of the Memphis City Hospital. She wrote an opinion editorial to the Memphis Commercial Appeal titled, "If Christ should Come to Memphis, and Visit the Hospital, What Would He See?" This op-ed caused considerable uproar throughout the Memphis public, which led to the construction of a new City Hospital and a complete overhaul in practices.

In addition, Mary was a major benefactor to Christian Brothers University (CBU). As a new year's gift in 1927, she donated 176 acres of land as well as her entire art collection to the Christian Brothers, with the exception of some works passed to her family. Her paintings were on display at CBU's original location on Adams Street, and then moved to its current location on East Parkway.

== Gallery ==
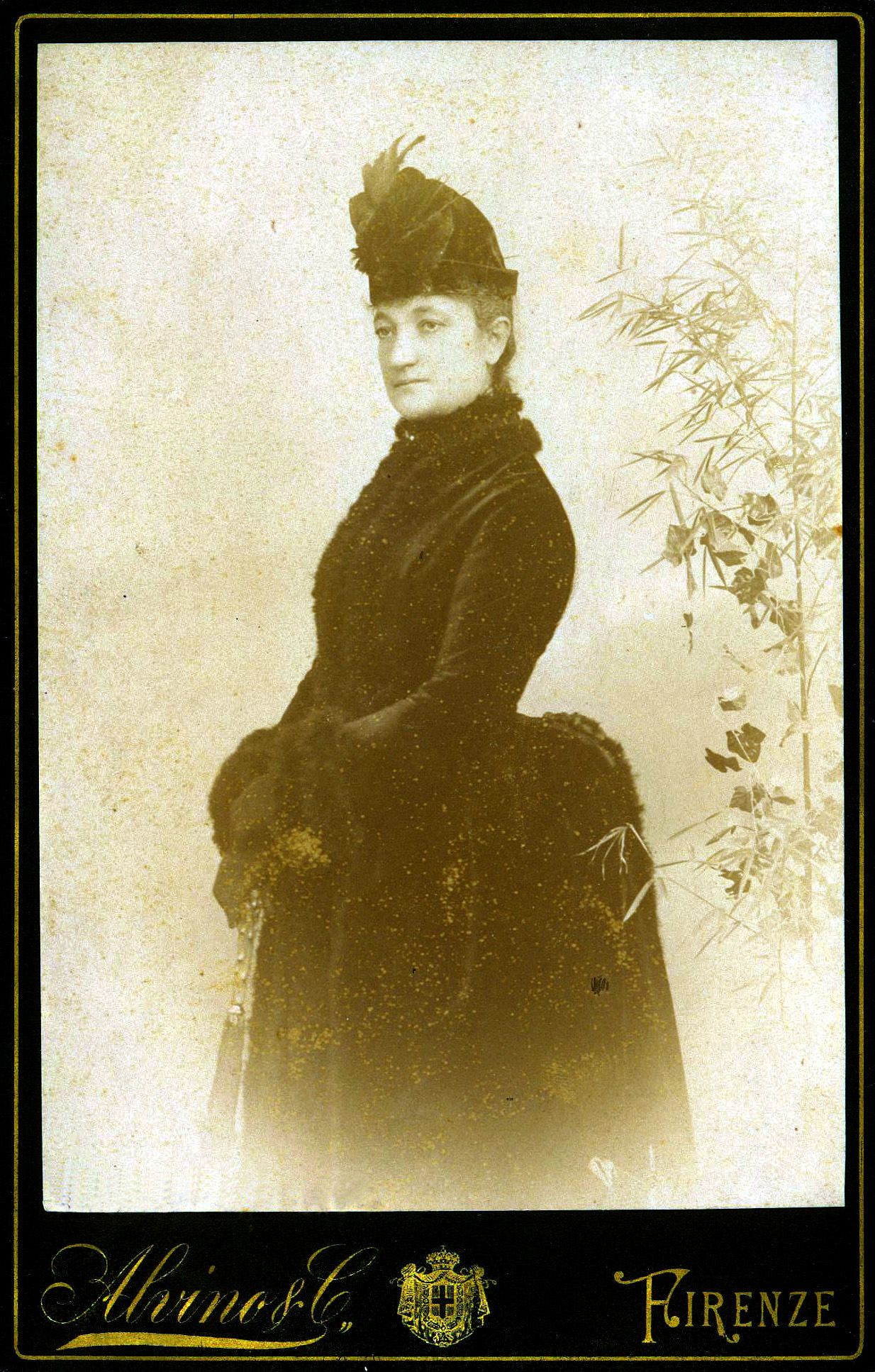
Photograph of Mary Solari in Florence

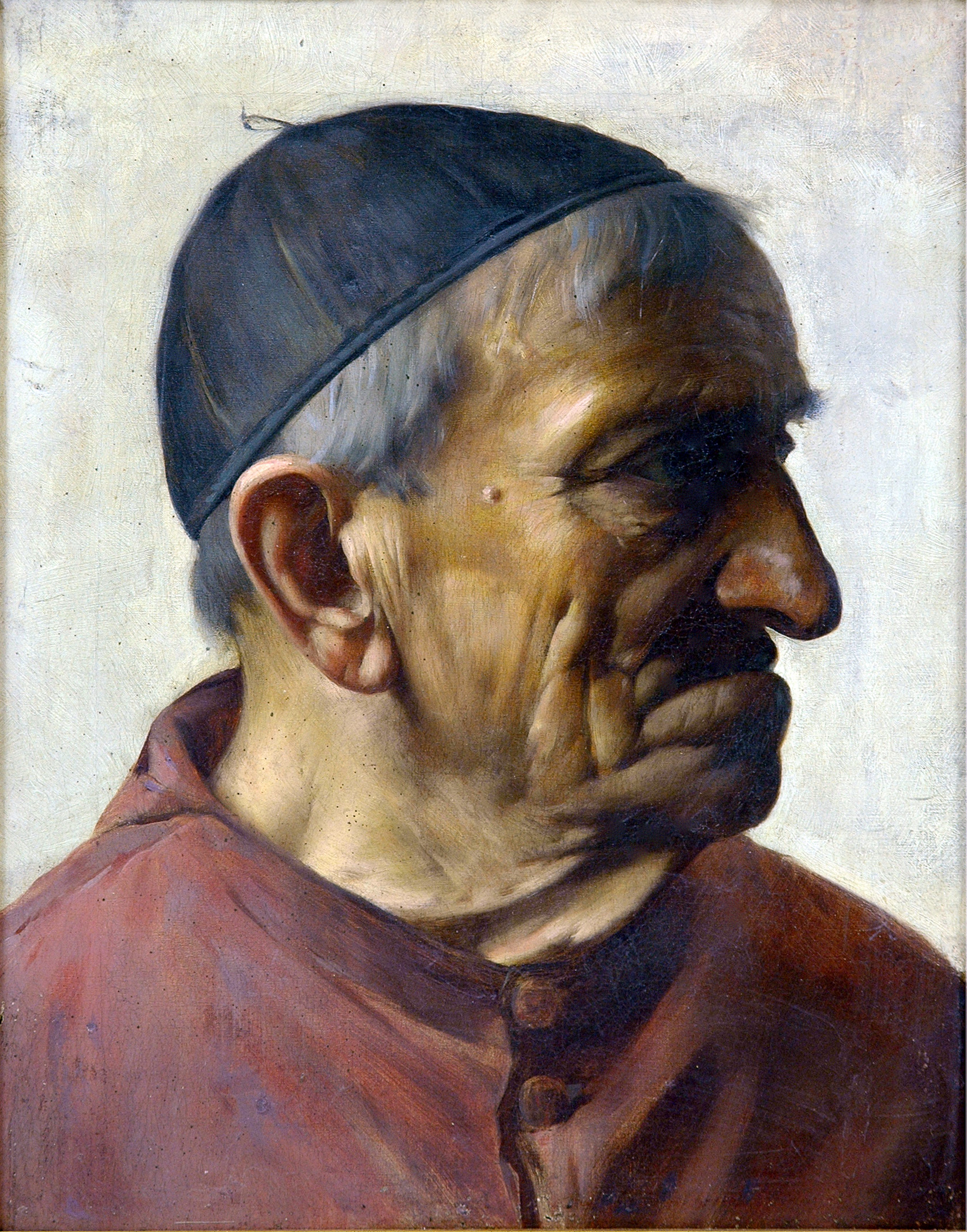
"The Cardinal" by Mary Solari

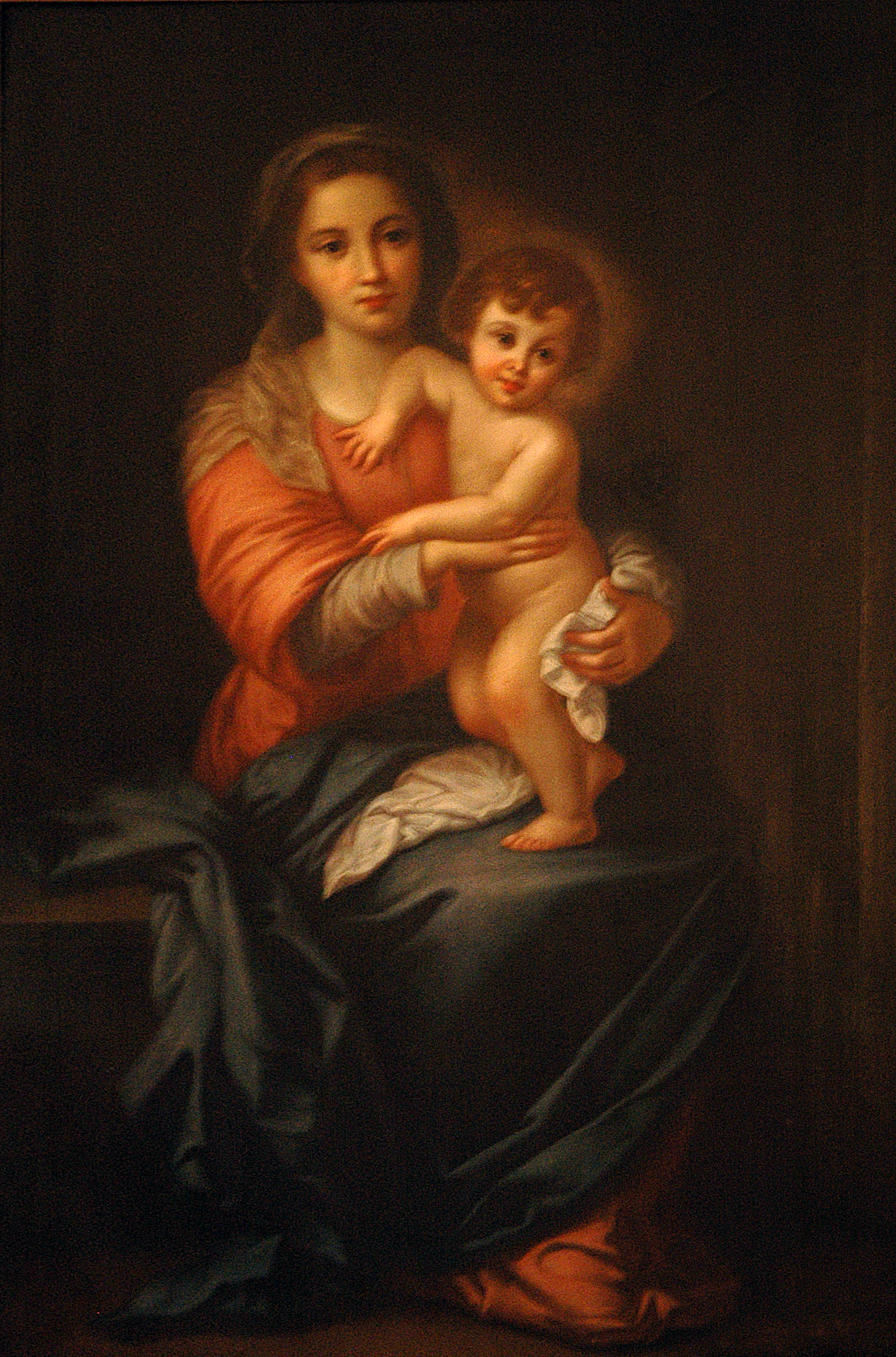
"Madonna and Child" by Mary Solari

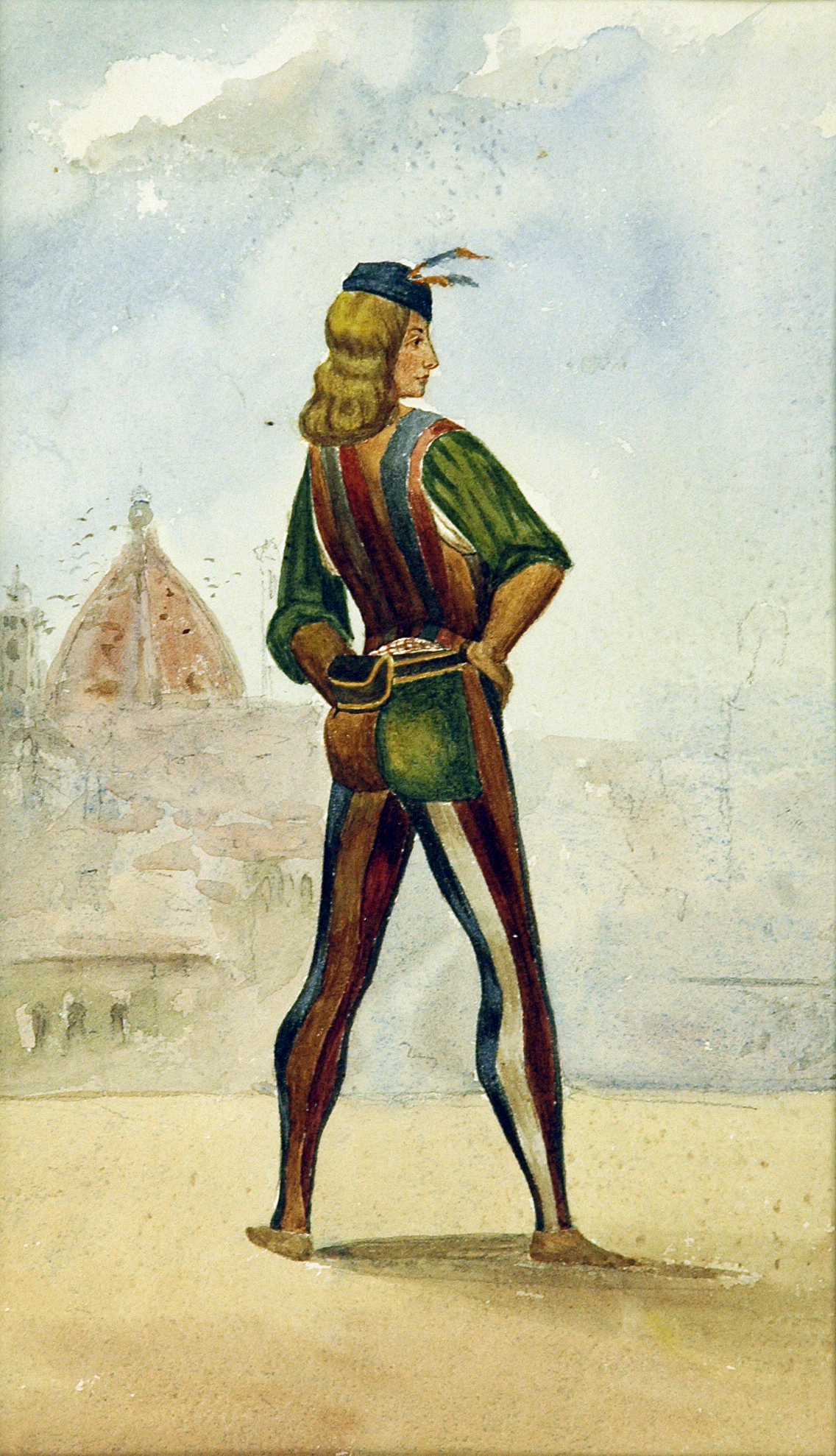
"Costume of the 13th Century" by Mary Solari

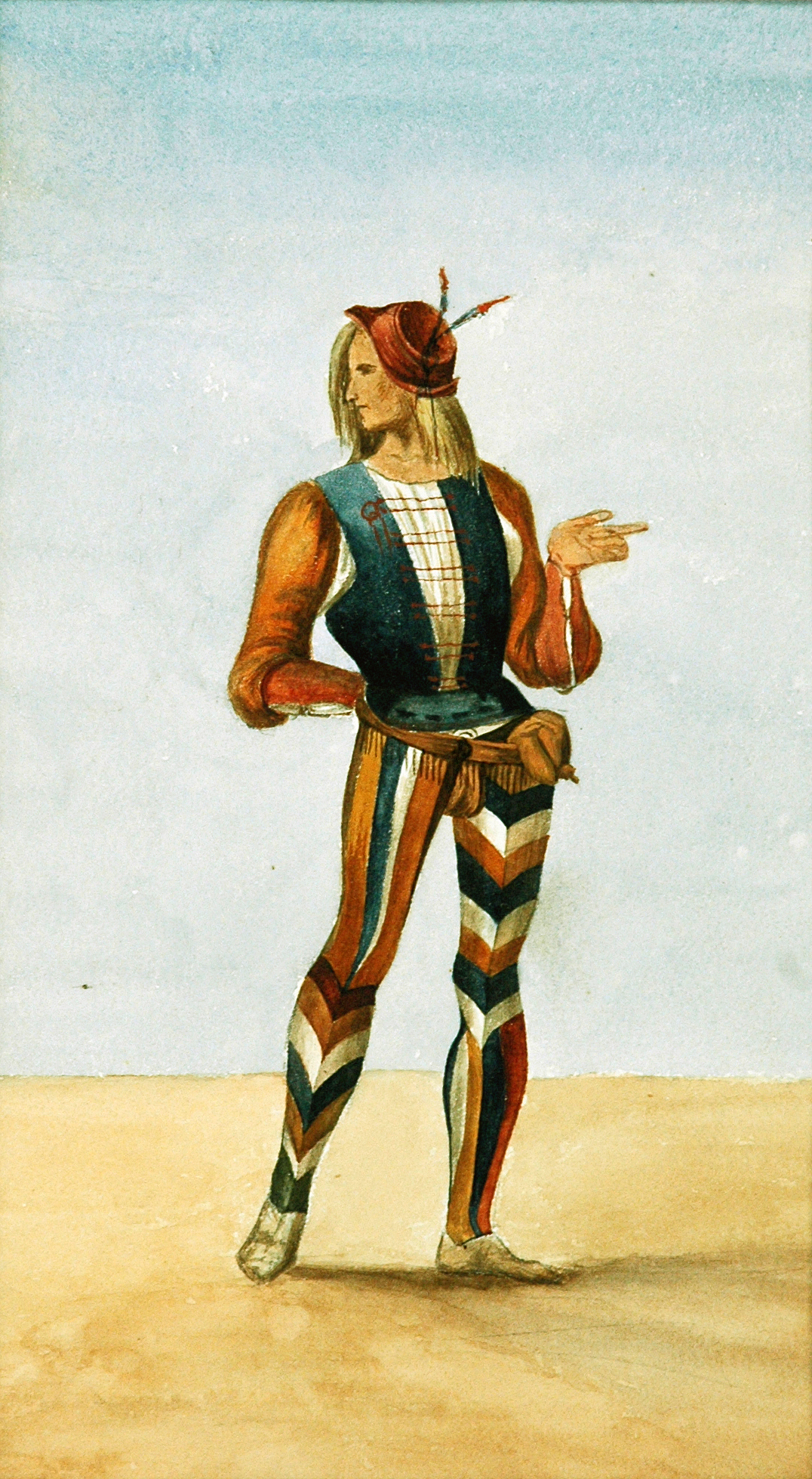
"Costume of the 13th Century (No. 2)" by Mary Solari

== See also ==
- History of Memphis, Tennessee
- Domenico Canale
