= Zoagli =

Zoagli Zoagi
- Comune
- Comune di Zoagli
- Aerial view of Zoagli (2026)

- Coat of arms

- Location within Italy Location within Liguria
- Coordinates: 44°20′N 9°16′E
- Country: Italy
- Region: Liguria
- Metropolitan city: Genoa (GE)
- Frazioni: Sant’Ambrogio, Semorile, San Pietro di Rovereto

Government
  - Mayor: Fabio De Ponti

Area
  - Total: 7.79 km^{2} (3.01 sq mi)
- Elevation: 17 m (56 ft)

Population (31 December 2015)
  - Total: 2,472
  - Density: 317/km^{2} (822/sq mi)
- Demonym: Zoagliesi
- Time zone: UTC+1 (CET)
  - Summer (DST): UTC+2 (CEST)
- Postal code: 16035
- Dialing code: 0185
- ISTAT code: 010067
- Patron saint: St. Martin of Tours
- Saint day: November 11
- Website: Official website

Zoagli (Ligurian: Zoagi) is a comune (municipality) in the Metropolitan City of Genoa in the Italian region Liguria, located about 30 kilometres (19 mi) southeast of Genoa. Zoagli is a popular destination during all seasons of the year by tourists from all over the world. It is located in the Gulf of Tigullio section of the Italian Riviera, between Chiavari and Rapallo.

The municipality is also known for its silk fabrics exported around the world and its cliff paths (creuze and mule tracks) that run along the Mediterranean Sea connecting Zoagli to its nearby villages: San Pietro di Rovereto, San Pantaleo, Semorile, St. Ambrose, and St. Martin. A bronze sculpture named the Madonna del Mare sits 2.7 metres (9 ft) underwater in front of the promenade in honor of a diving event held each year.

== History ==
Zoagli was probably founded by the Tigulli Ligurian tribe. In Roman times it appears as a center on the Via Aurelia in the Tabula Peutingeriana.

In the Middle Ages it was a fief of the Fieschi family from Lavagna, becoming a possession of the Republic of Genoa in the 13th century. In 1608 it was part of the capitaneato of Rapallo. In 1815, together with Genoa, it was annexed to the Kingdom of Sardinia, following its history.

On 27 December 1943 Zoagli was unexpectedly bombed, and nearly destroyed with many victims among the inhabitants, by the RAF. The target of bombing apparently was the railway bridge, but the railway was totally inactive because it was previously destroyed in several points elsewhere.

Several notable authors have been associated with this location. Among them the German philosopher Friedrich Nietzsche,the American poet Ezra Pound., and Italian playwright Sem Benelli who built Sem Benelli Castle there.
