= I Borghi più belli d'Italia =

Association of small Italian towns of historical and artistic interest

I borghi più belli d'Italia
- The most beautiful villages of Italy

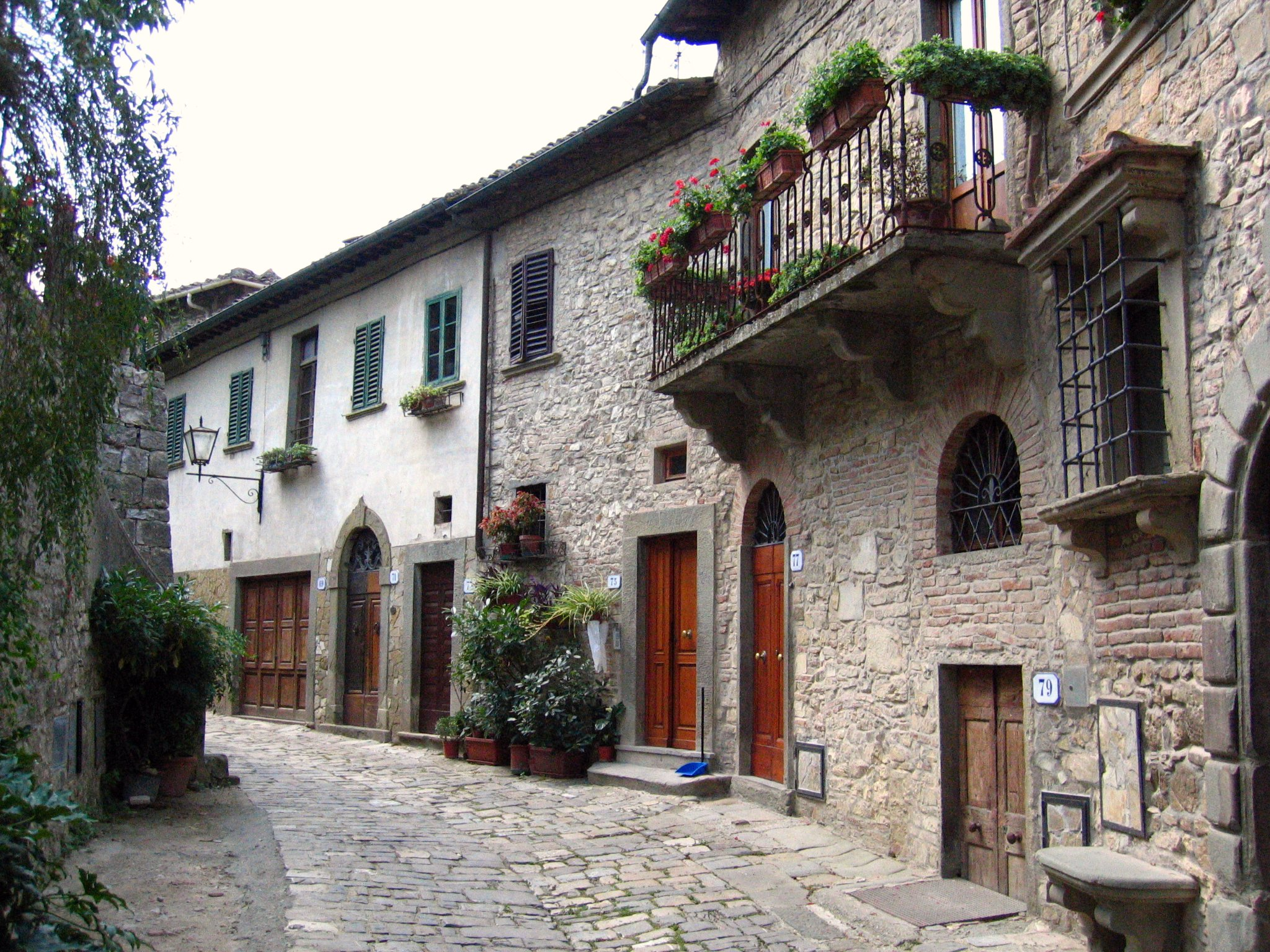
- Montefioralle, in Tuscany, is one of "The Most Beautiful Villages in Italy".
- Formation: 2001
- Type: Non-profit association
- Purpose: promotion and enhancement of history, landscape, culture and tourism
- Location: Rome, Italy
- Region served: Italy
- Members: 361 (2023)
- Official language: Italian
- President: Fiorello Primi
- Affiliations: The Most Beautiful Villages in the World
- Website: borghipiubelliditalia.it

I borghi più belli d'Italia (Note: Variously translated as "the most beautiful villages of Italy", "Italy's most beautiful villages", "Italy's most beautiful towns" and "Italy's prettiest villages".) (Italian: [i ˈborɡi pju bˈbɛlli diˈtaːlja]) is a non-profit private association of small Italian towns of strong historical and artistic interest. It was founded in March 2001 on the initiative of the Tourism Council of the National Association of Italian Municipalities, with the aim of preserving and maintaining villages of quality heritage. Its motto is Il fascino dell'Italia nascosta ("The charm of hidden Italy").

Participants in the group are small population centres which risk neglect and abandonment because they lie outside the main tourist circuits. Initially they comprised about a hundred villages, but had increased to 361 in 2023.

In 2012, the Italian association was one of the founding members of the international association The Most Beautiful Villages in the World, a private organization that brings together various territorial associations promoting small inhabited centres of particular historical and landscape interest.

== Description ==
=== Admission criteria ===
The criteria for admission to the association are: integrity of the urban fabric, architectural harmony, livability of the village, artistic-historical quality of the public and private building heritage, services to the citizen as well as the payment of an annual membership fee.

=== Initiatives ===
The association organizes initiatives within the villages, such as festivals, exhibitions, fetes, conferences and concerts that highlight the cultural, historical, gastronomic and linguistic heritage, involving residents, schools, and local artists. The club promotes numerous initiatives on the international market. In 2016, the association signed a global agreement with ENIT, to promote tourism in the most beautiful villages in the world. In 2017, the club signed an agreement with Costa Cruises for the enhancement of some villages, which are offered to cruise passengers arriving in Italian ports aboard the operator's ships.

=== Regional subdivision ===
The regional subdivision of the villages members of the association is as follows: 31 in Marche and Umbria, 29 in Tuscany, 27 in Liguria, 26 in Abruzzo and Lombardy, 25 in Lazio, 24 in Sicily, 20 in Piedmont, 16 in Emilia-Romagna and Trentino-Alto Adige, 15 in Calabria, 14 in Apulia, 13 in Friuli-Venezia Giulia, 11 in Veneto and Campania, 9 in Sardinia and Basilicata, 4 in Molise and 3 in Aosta Valley.

== Villages ==
=== Northern Italy ===
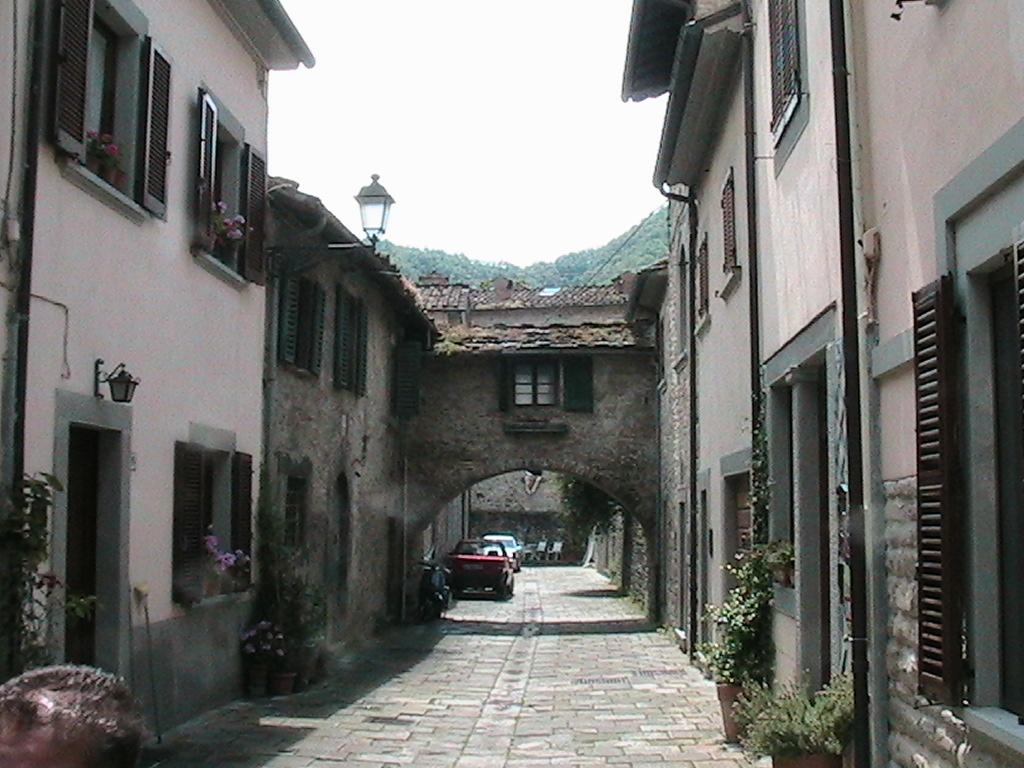
Bagno di Romagna

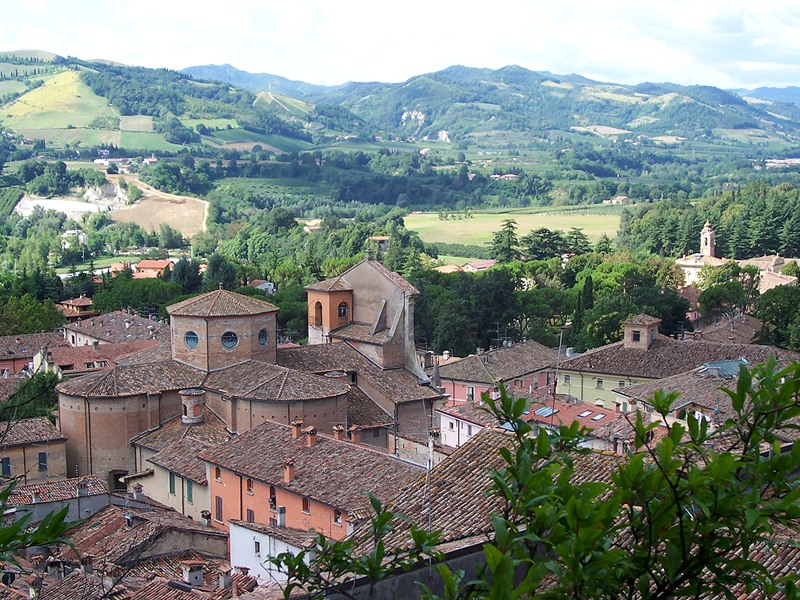
Brisighella

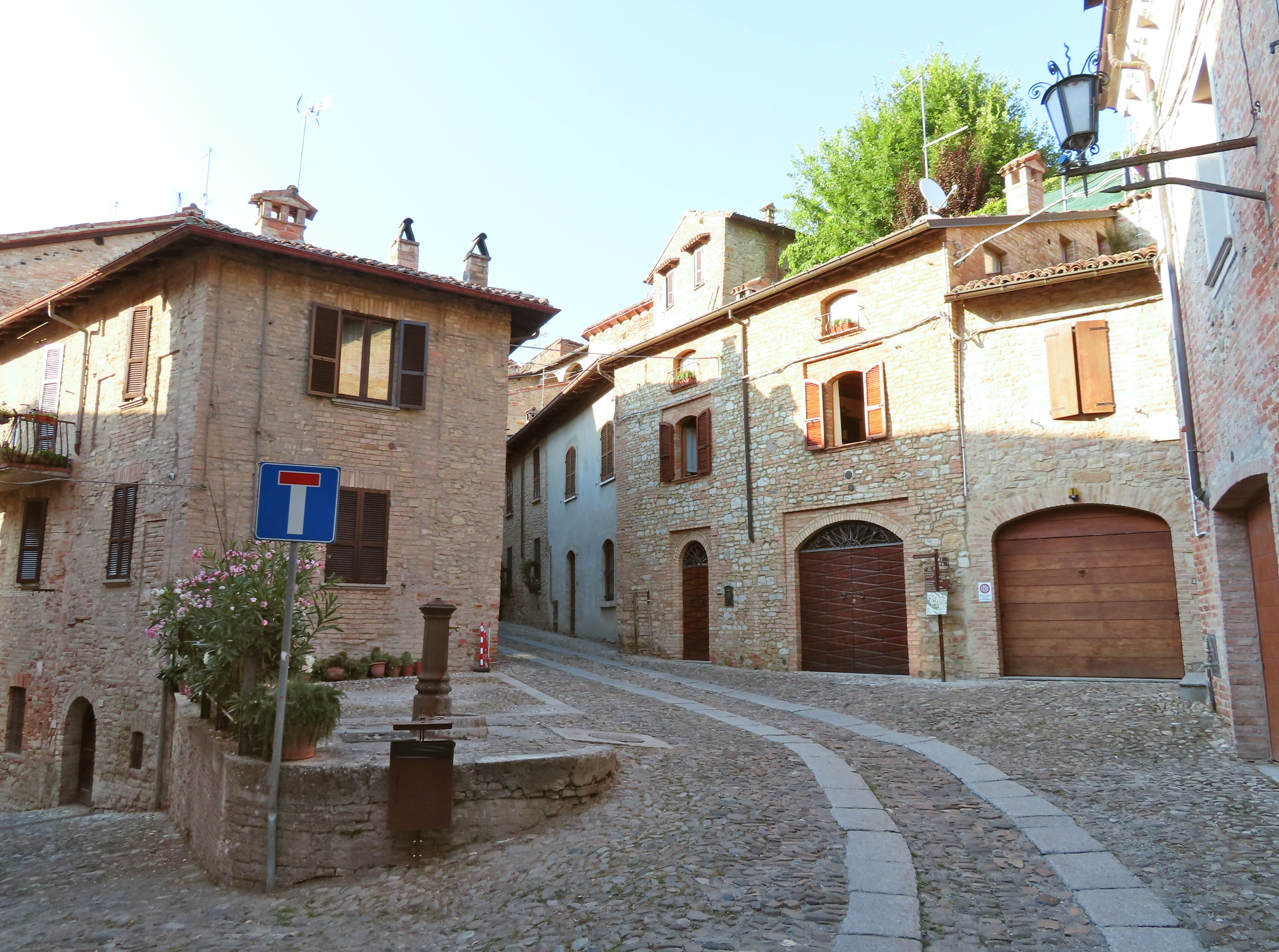
Castell'Arquato

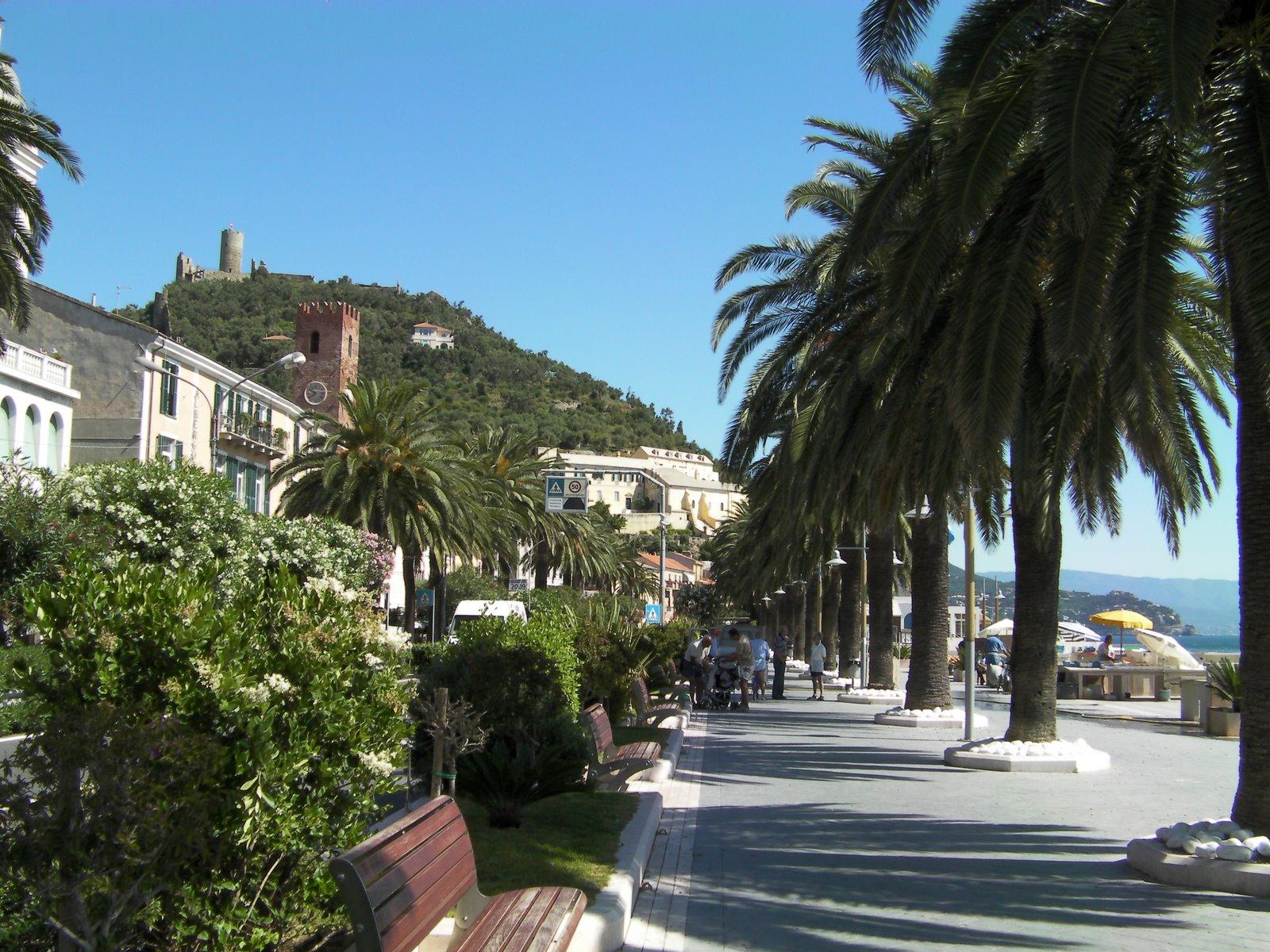
Noli

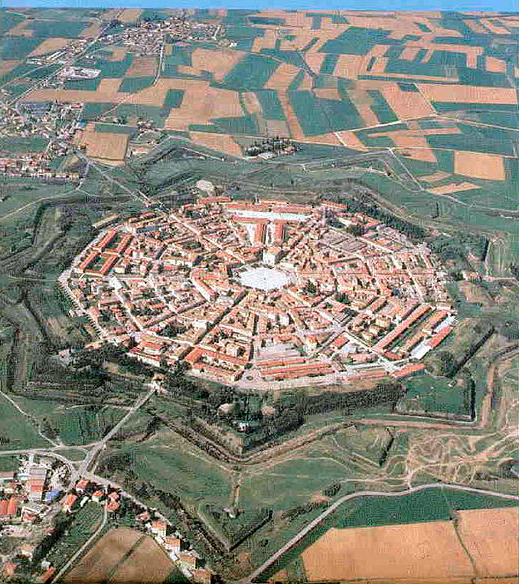
Palmanova

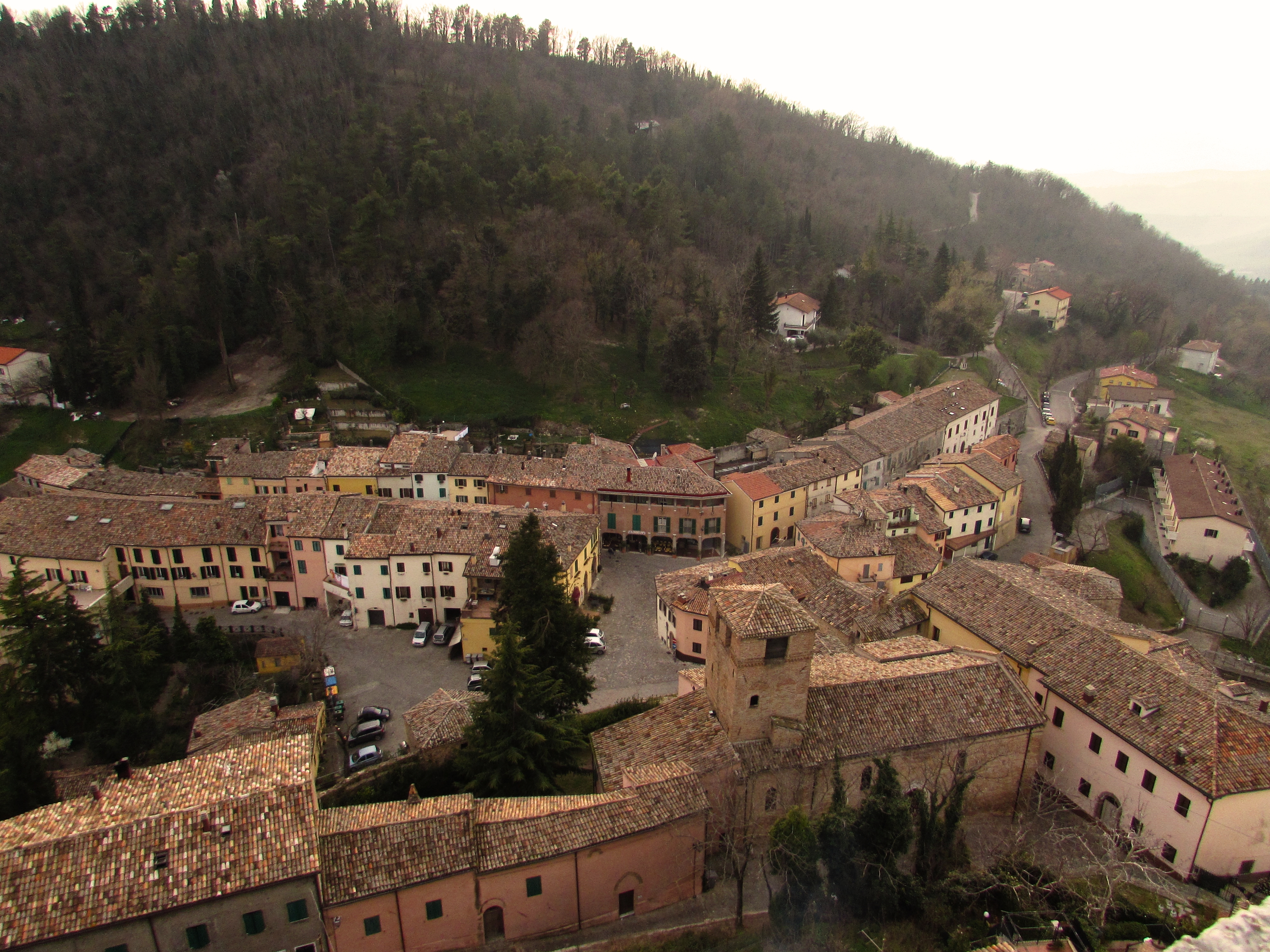
Montefiore Conca

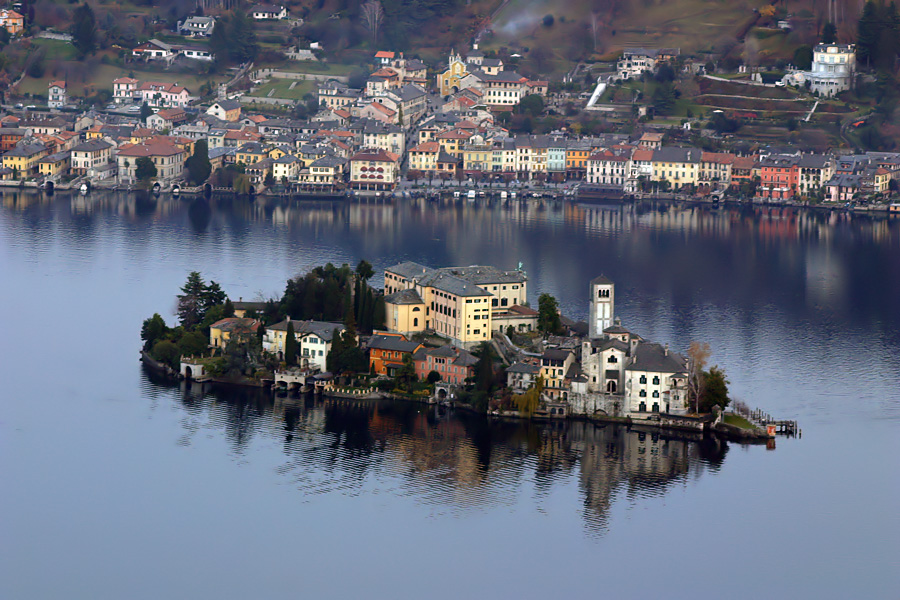
Orta San Giulio

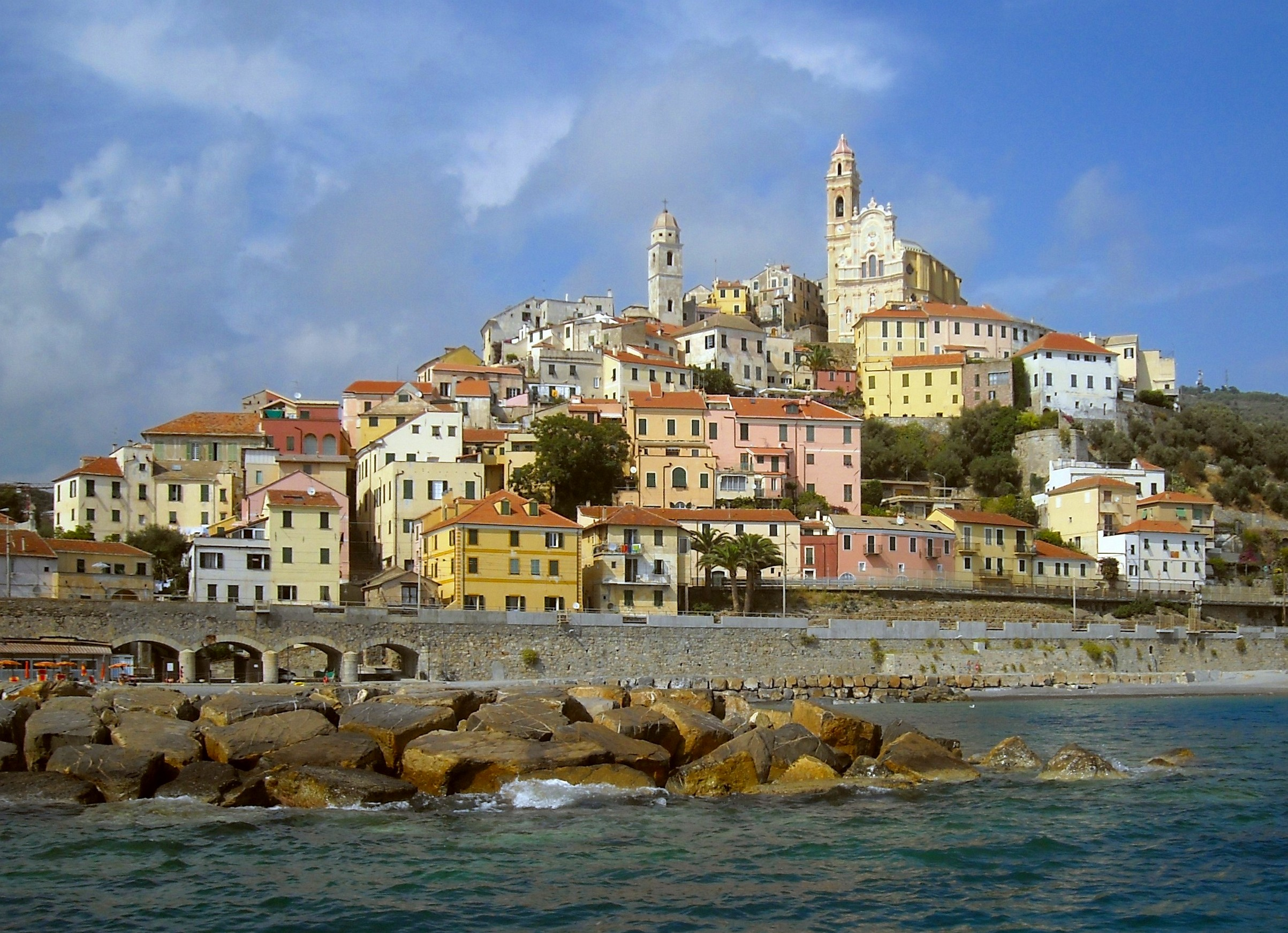
Cervo

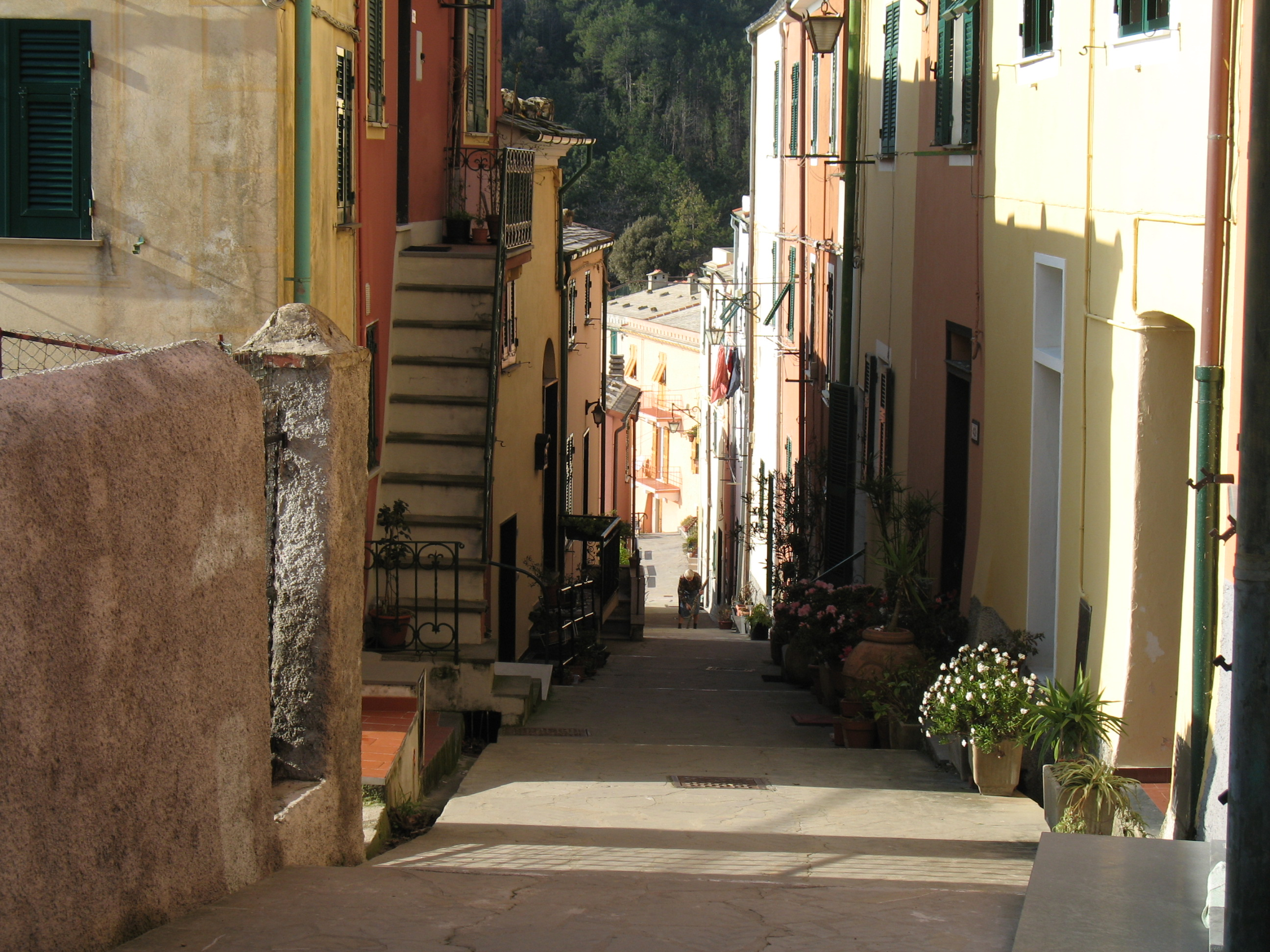
Framura

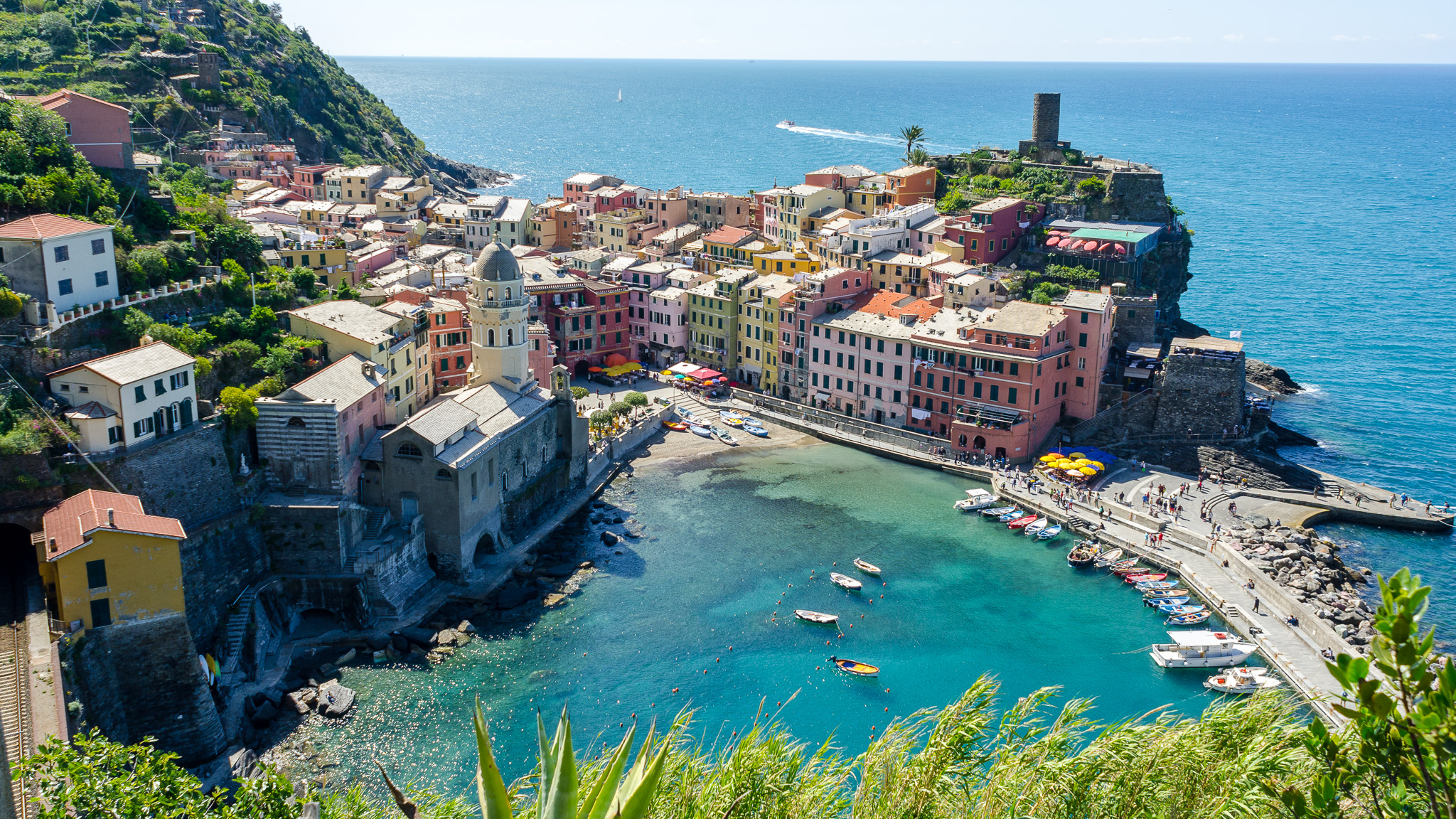
Vernazza

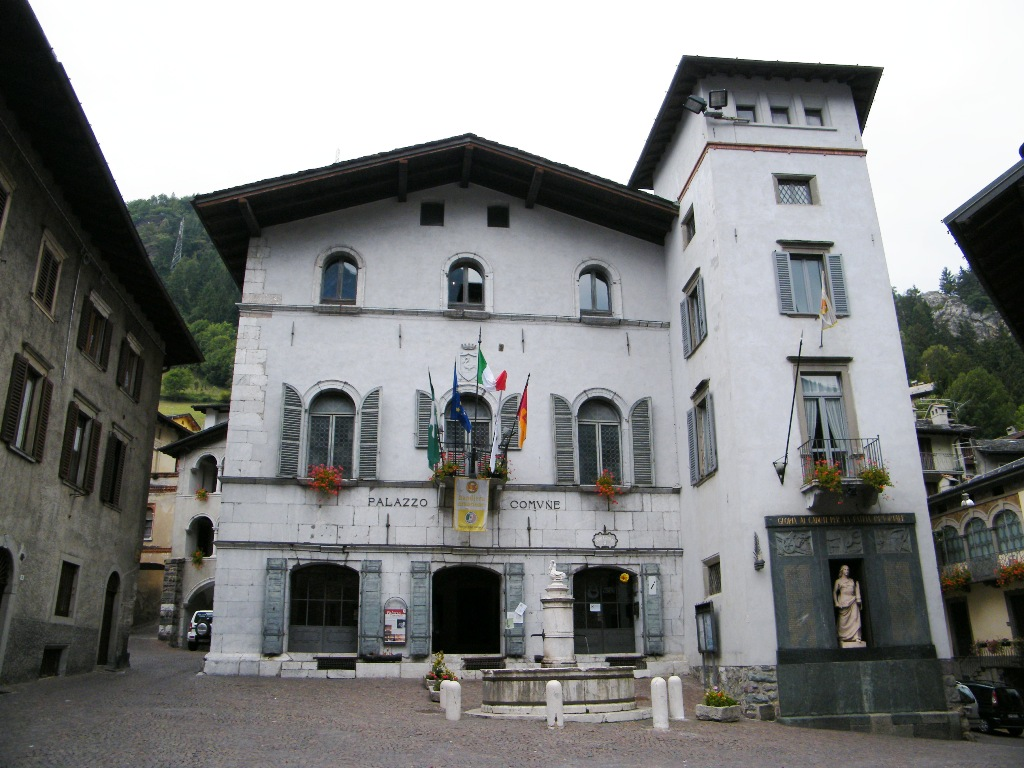
Gromo

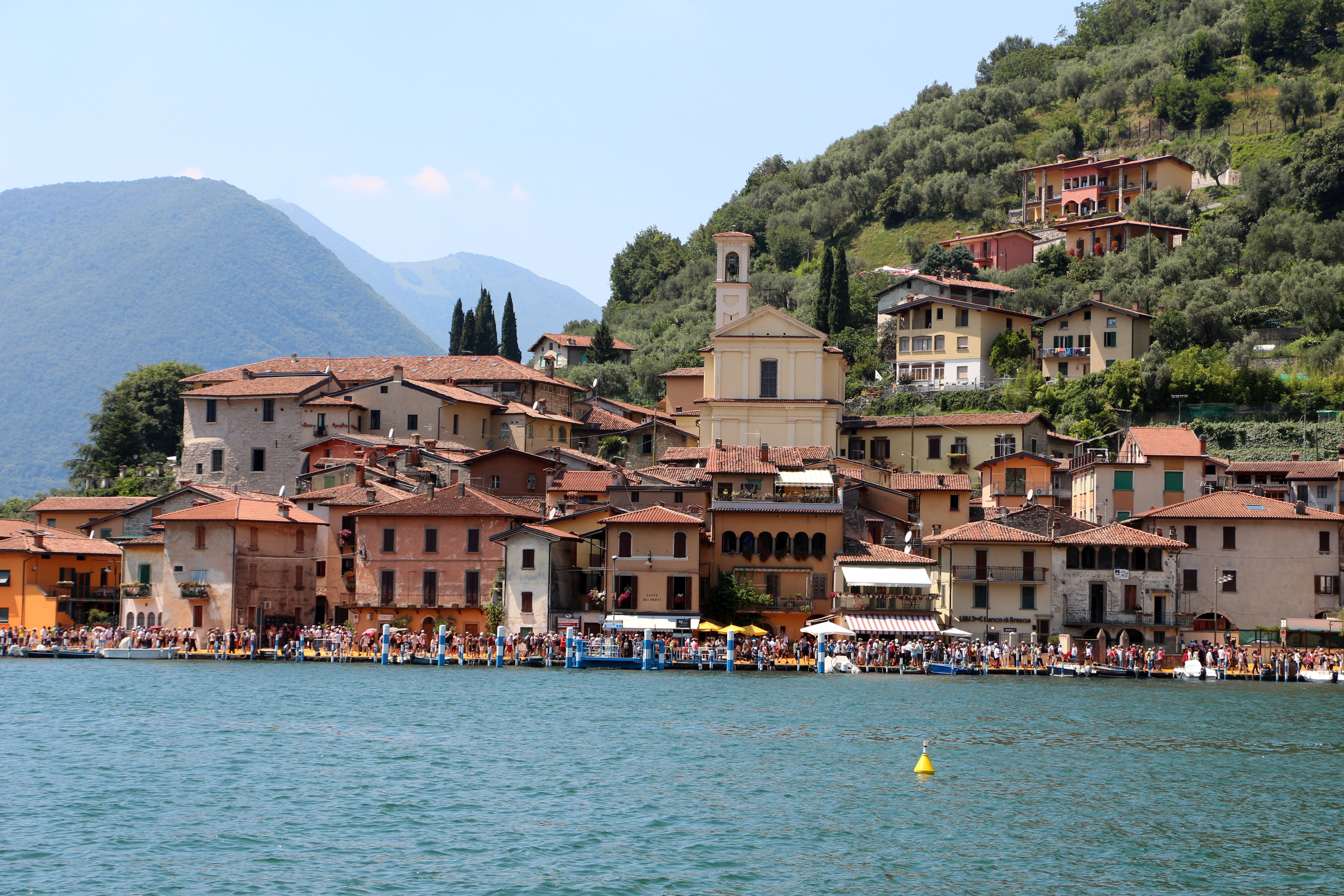
Monte Isola

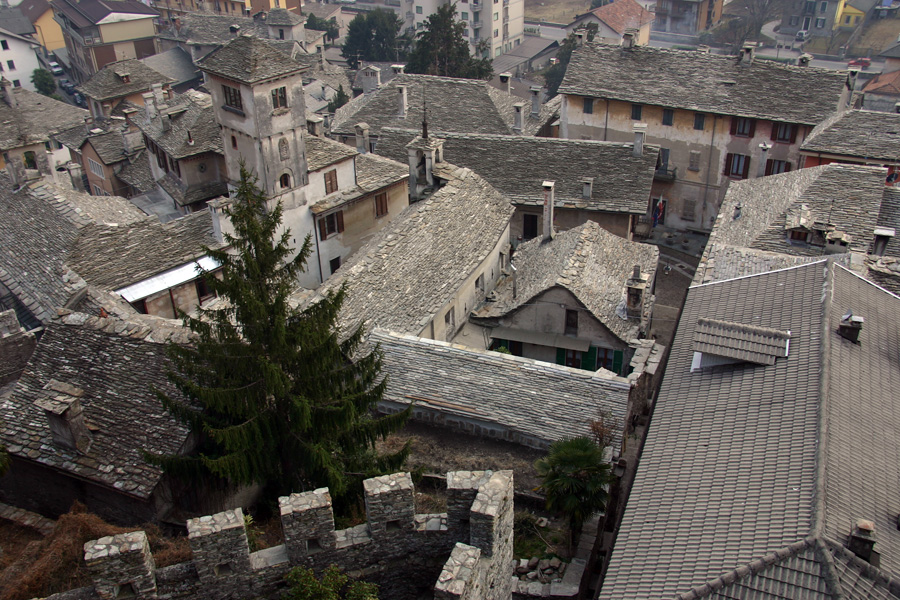
Vogogna

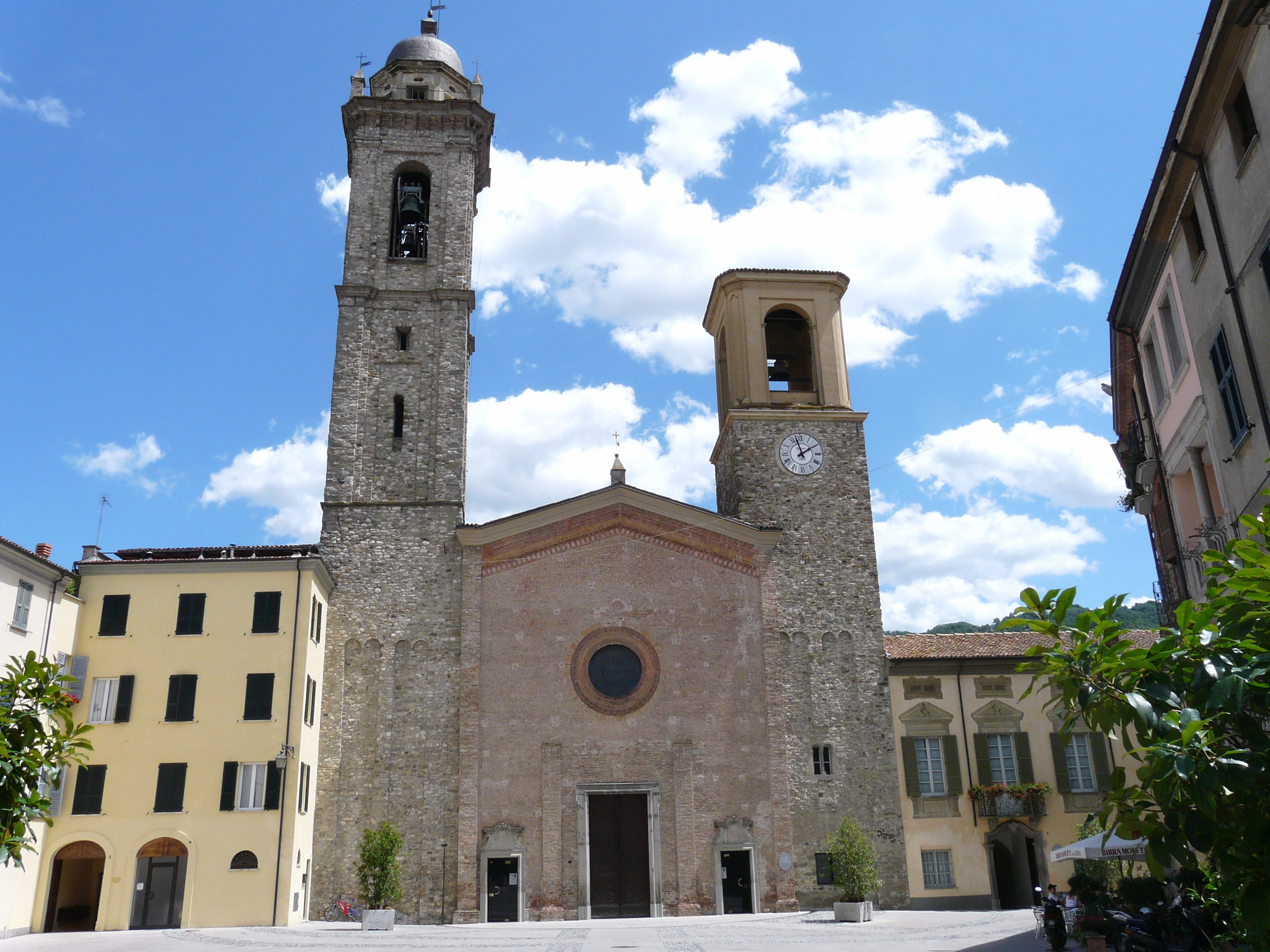
Bobbio

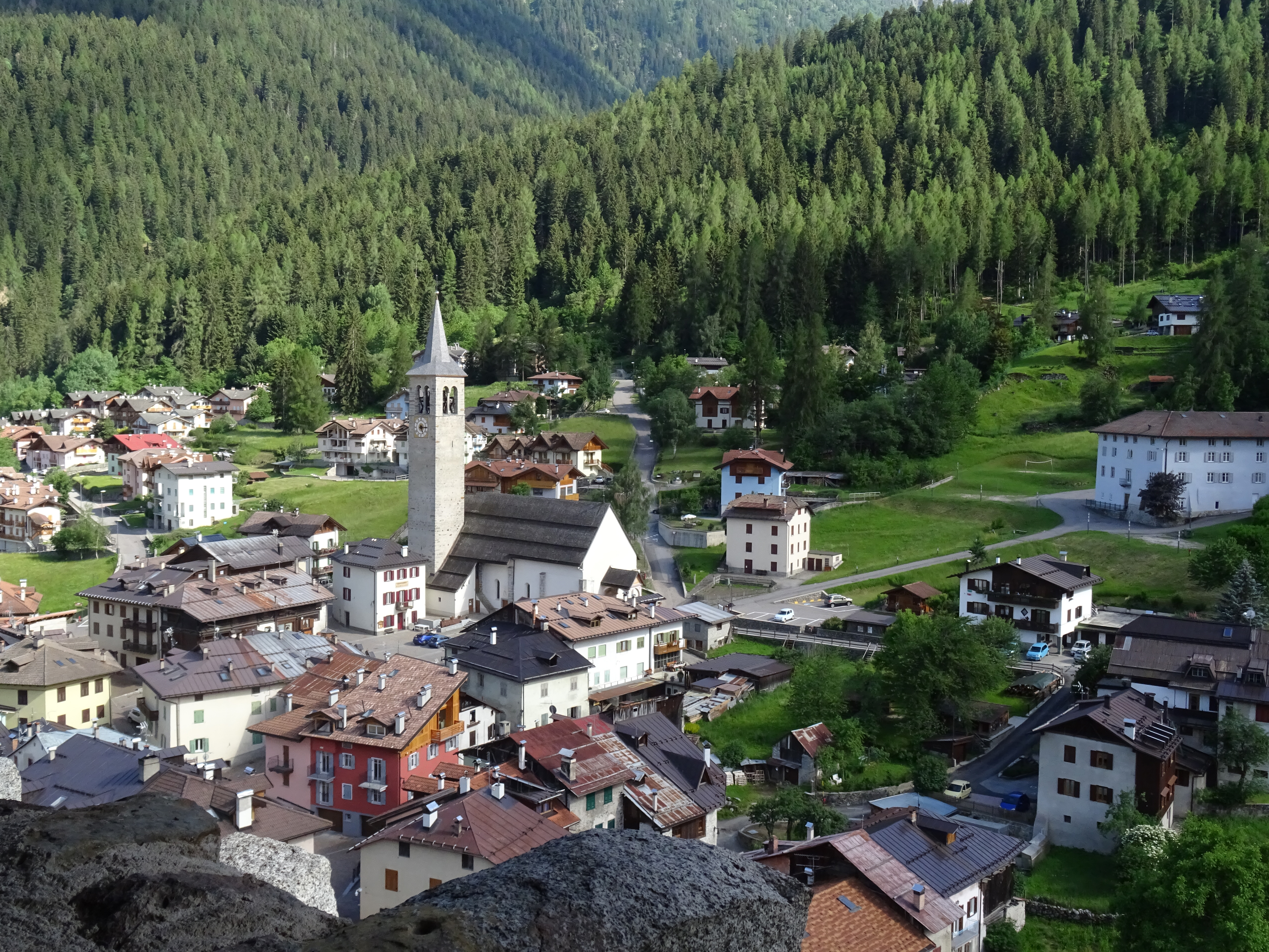
Ossana

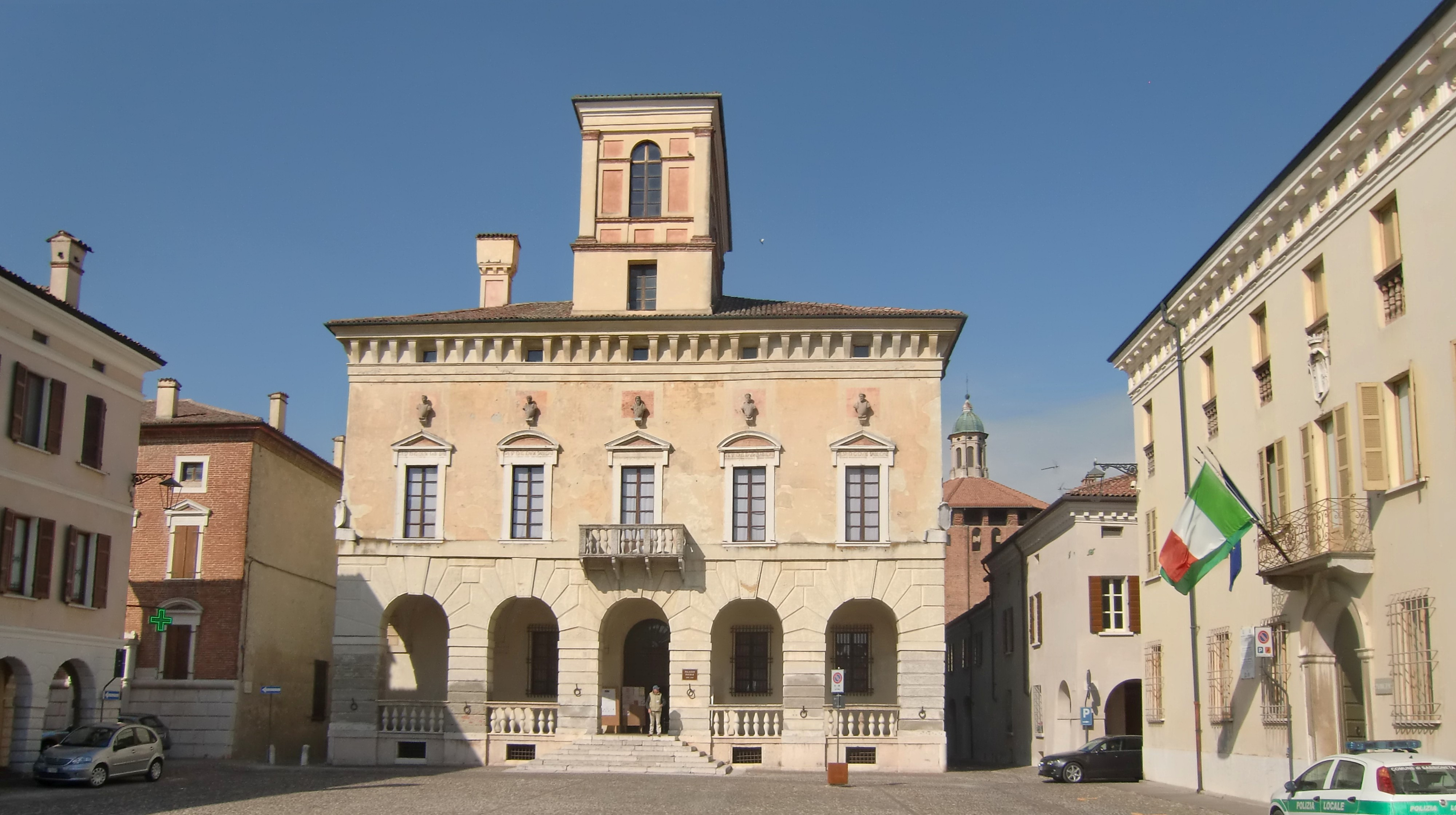
Sabbioneta

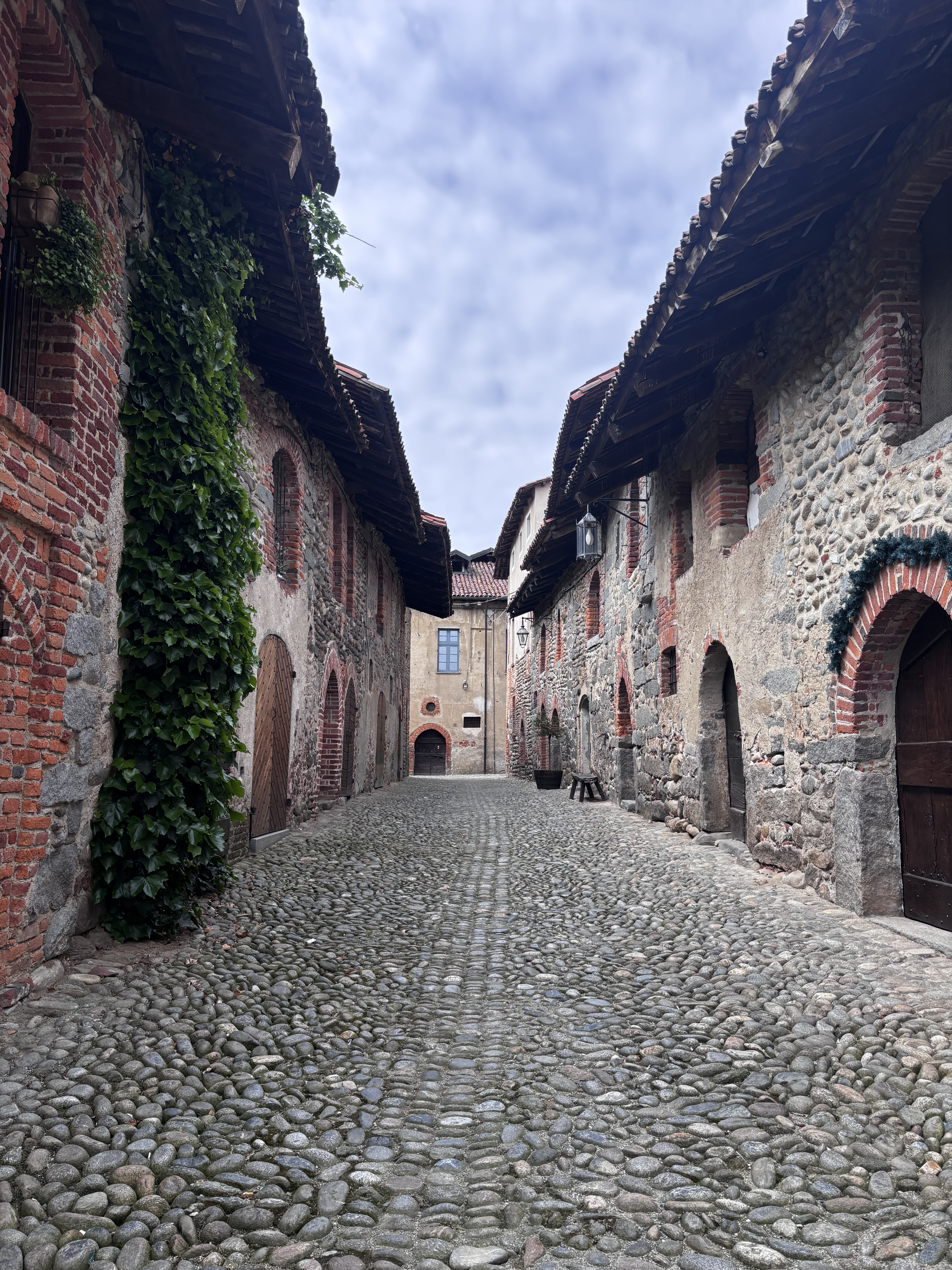
Candelo

- Aosta Valley (3)
  - Bard
  - Fontainemore
  - Étroubles
- Emilia-Romagna (16)
  - Bagnara di Romagna
  - Bagno di Romagna
  - Bobbio
  - Brisighella
  - Castell'Arquato
  - Compiano
  - Dozza
  - Fiumalbo
  - Gualtieri
  - Montechiarugolo
  - Montefiore Conca
  - Montegridolfo
  - San Giovanni in Marignano
  - San Leo
  - Verucchio
  - Vigoleno
- Friuli-Venezia Giulia (13)
  - Clauiano
  - Cordovado
  - Fagagna
  - Gradisca d'Isonzo
  - Palmanova
  - Poffabro
  - Polcenigo
  - Sappada
  - Sesto al Reghena
  - Strassoldo
  - Toppo
  - Valvasone Arzene
  - Venzone
- Liguria (27)
  - Apricale
  - Badalucco
  - Brugnato
  - Campo Ligure
  - Castelvecchio di Rocca Barbena
  - Celle Ligure
  - Cervo
  - Colletta di Castelbianco
  - Deiva Marina
  - Diano Castello
  - Finalborgo
  - Framura
  - Laigueglia
  - Lingueglietta
  - Millesimo
  - Moneglia
  - Montemarcello
  - Noli
  - Perinaldo
  - Seborga
  - Taggia
  - Tellaro
  - Triora
  - Varese Ligure
  - Verezzi
  - Vernazza
  - Zuccarello
- Lombardy (26)
  - Bellano
  - Bienno
  - Borgo Santa Caterina
  - Cassinetta di Lugagnano
  - Castellaro Lagusello
  - Castelponzone
  - Clusone
  - Cornello dei Tasso
  - Fortunago
  - Gardone Riviera
  - Golferenzo
  - Gradella
  - Grazie
  - Gromo
  - Lovere
  - Maccagno Imperiale
  - Monte Isola
  - Morimondo
  - Pomponesco
  - Sabbioneta
  - San Benedetto Po
  - Soncino
  - Tremezzo
  - Tremosine sul Garda
  - Varzi
  - Zavattarello
- Piedmont (20)
  - Barolo
  - Castagnole delle Lanze
  - Cella Monte
  - Chianale
  - Cocconato
  - Garbagna
  - Garessio
  - Guarene
  - Ingria
  - Mombaldone
  - Monforte d'Alba
  - Neive
  - Orta San Giulio
  - Ostana
  - Ricetto di Candelo
  - Rosazza
  - Usseauso
  - Vho
  - Vogogna
  - Volpedo
- Trentino-Alto Adige/Südtirol (16)
  - Bondone
  - Borgo Valsugana
  - Caldes
  - Canale di Tenno
  - Castelrotto
  - Chiusa
  - Egna
  - Glorenza
  - Luserna
  - Mezzano
  - Ossana
  - Pieve Tesino
  - Rango
  - San Giovanni di Fassa
  - San Lorenzo in Banale
  - Vipiteno
- Veneto (11)
  - Arquà Petrarca
  - Asolo
  - Borghetto
  - Cison di Valmarino
  - Follina
  - Malcesine
  - Mel di Borgo Valbelluna
  - Montagnana
  - Portobuffolé
  - San Giorgio
  - Sottoguda

=== Central Italy ===
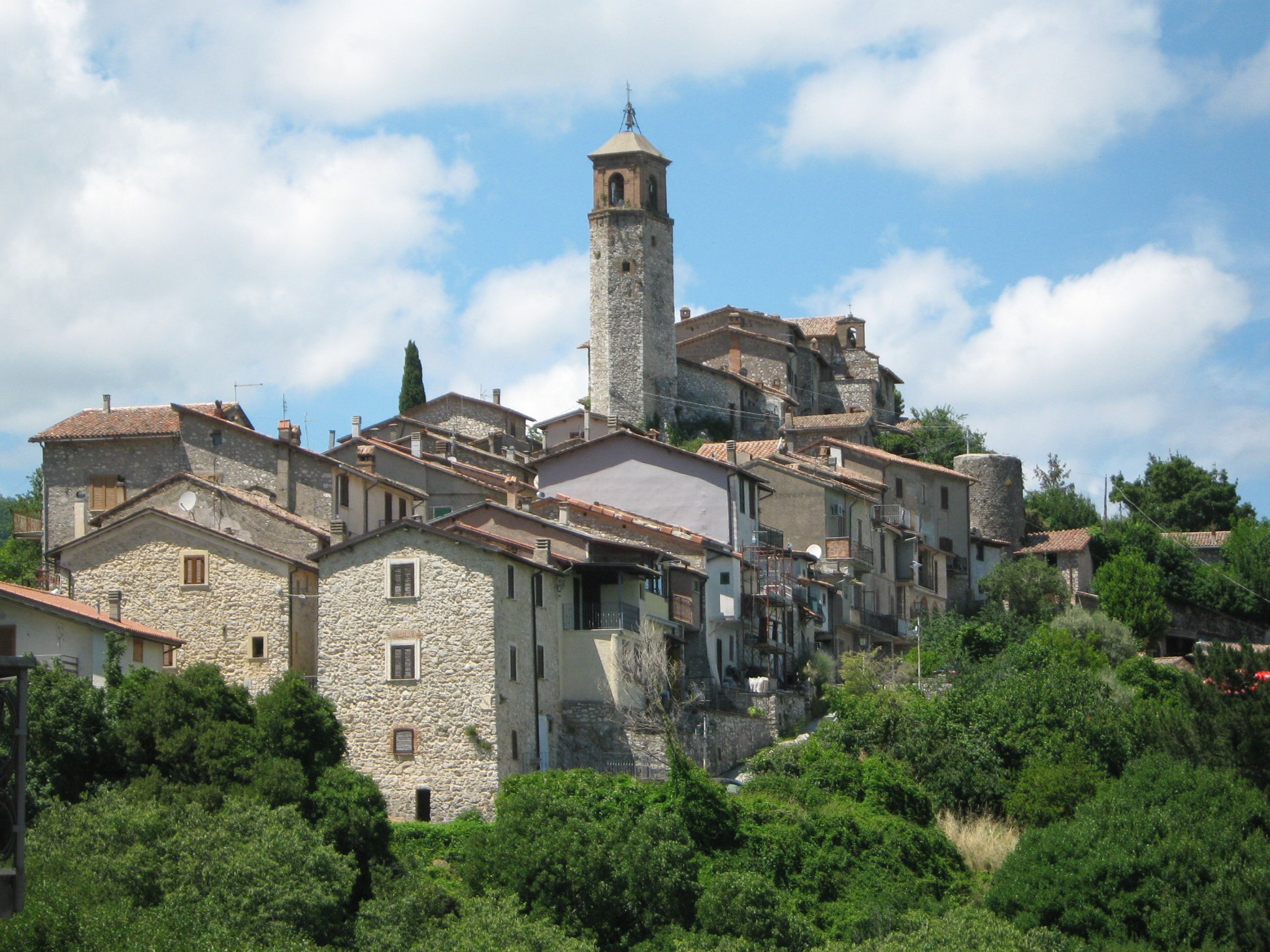
Greccio

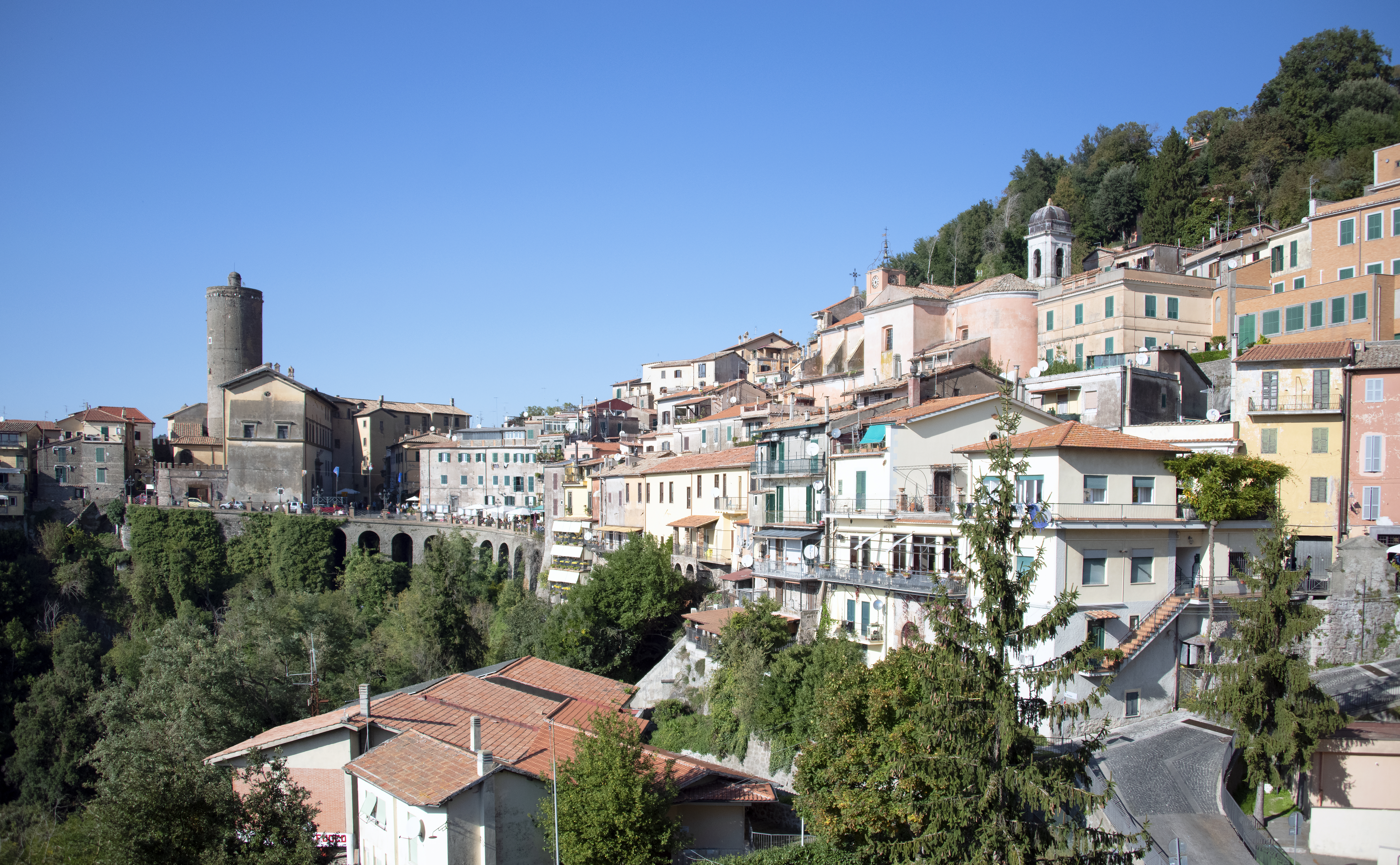
Nemi

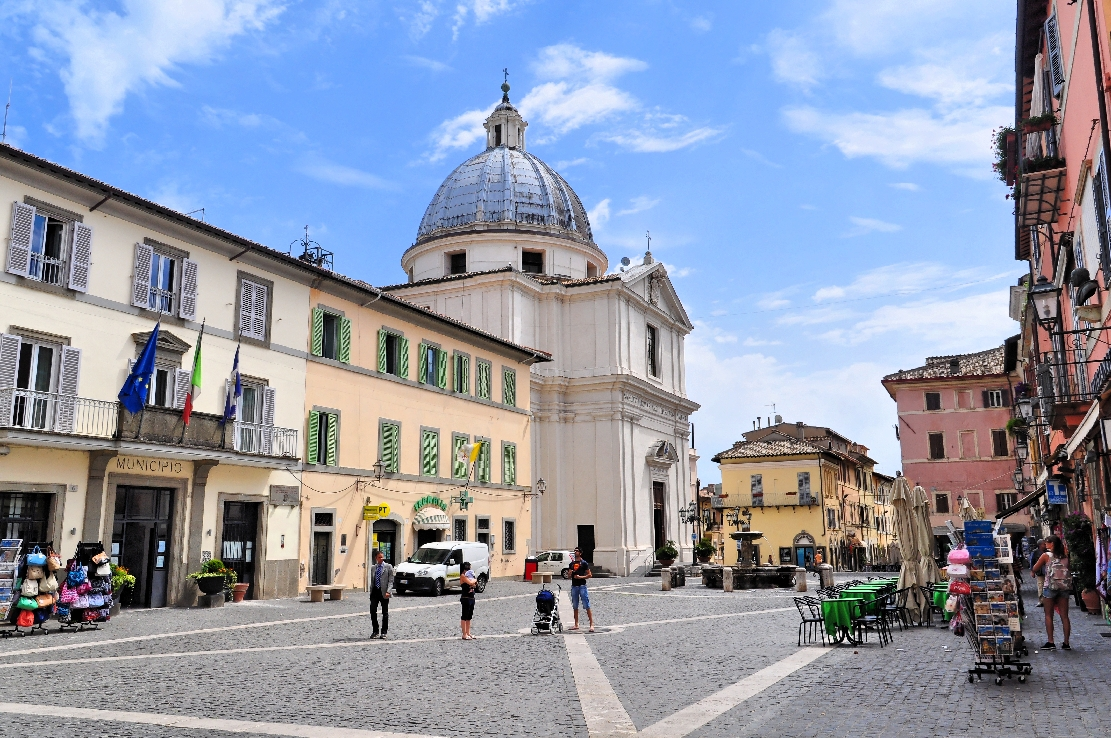
Castel Gandolfo

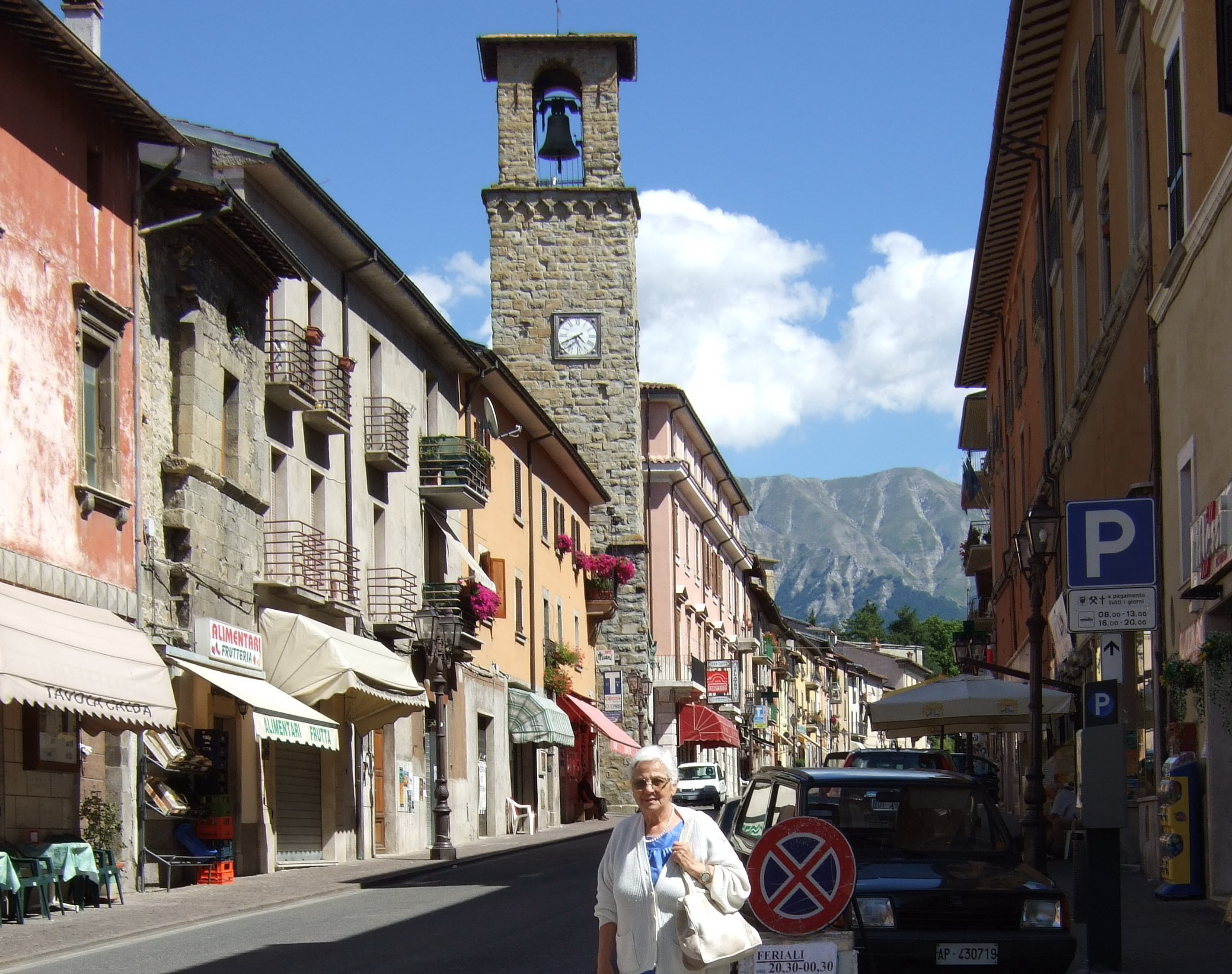
Amatrice

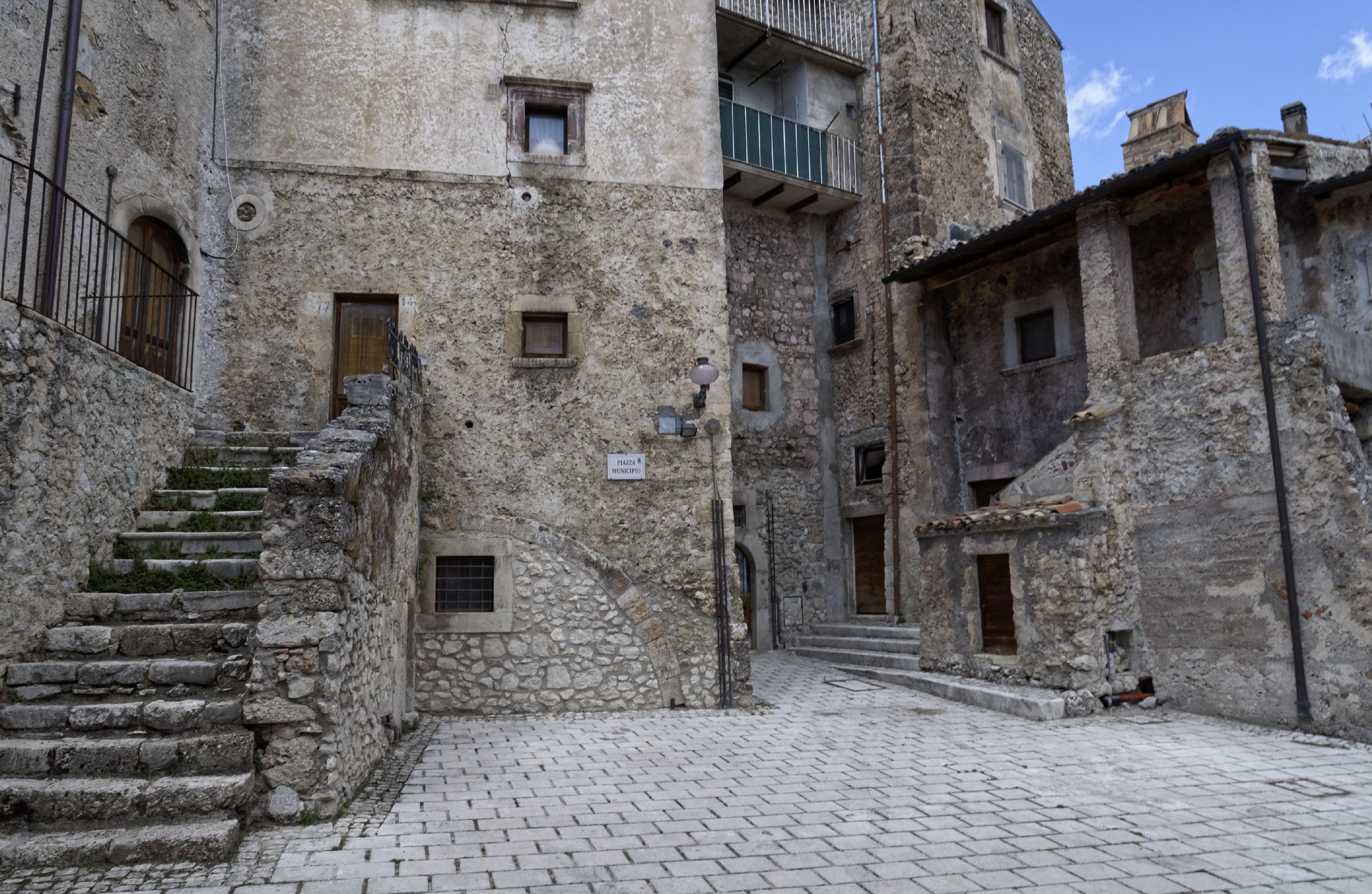
Santo Stefano di Sessanio

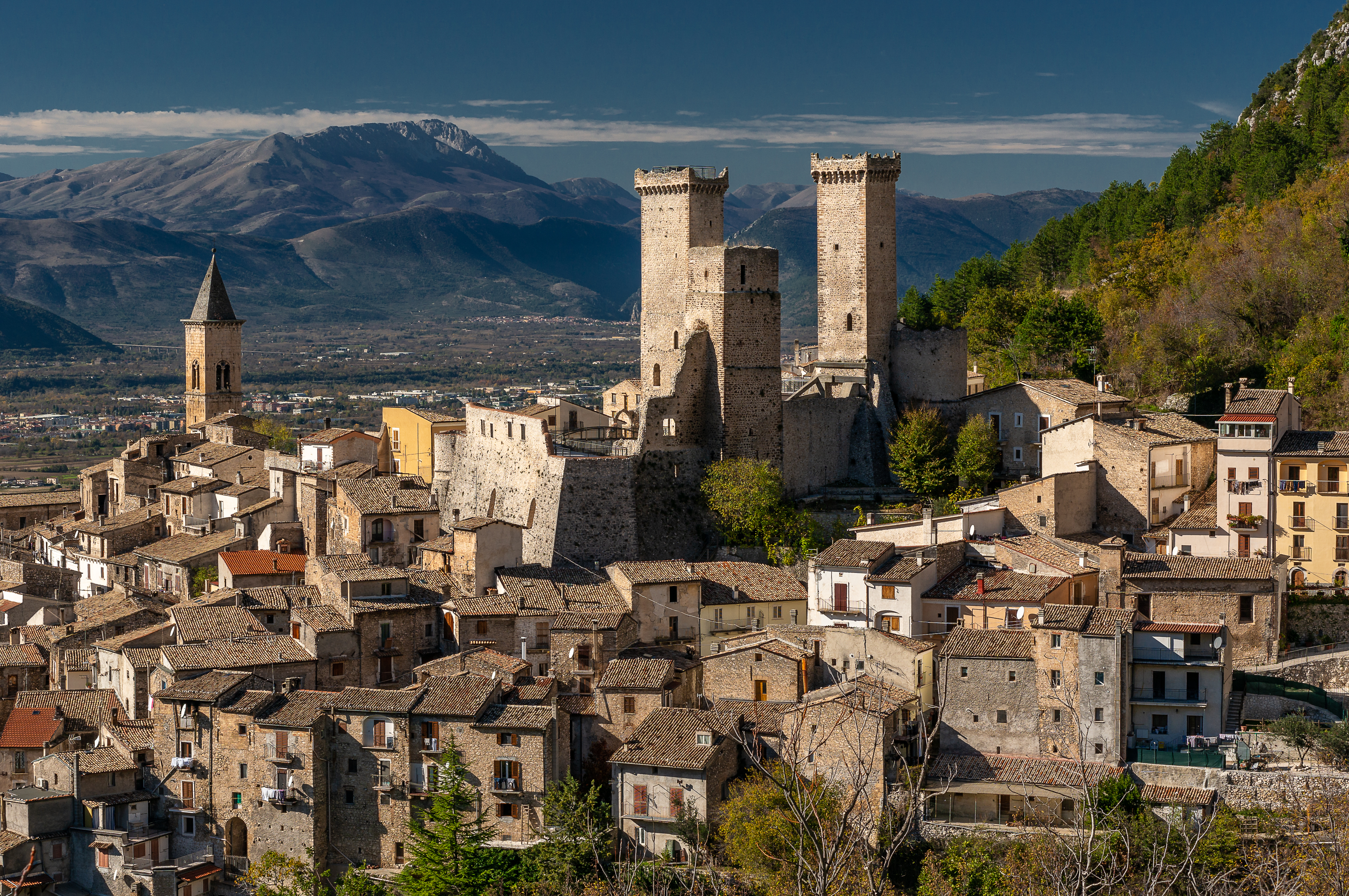
Pacentro

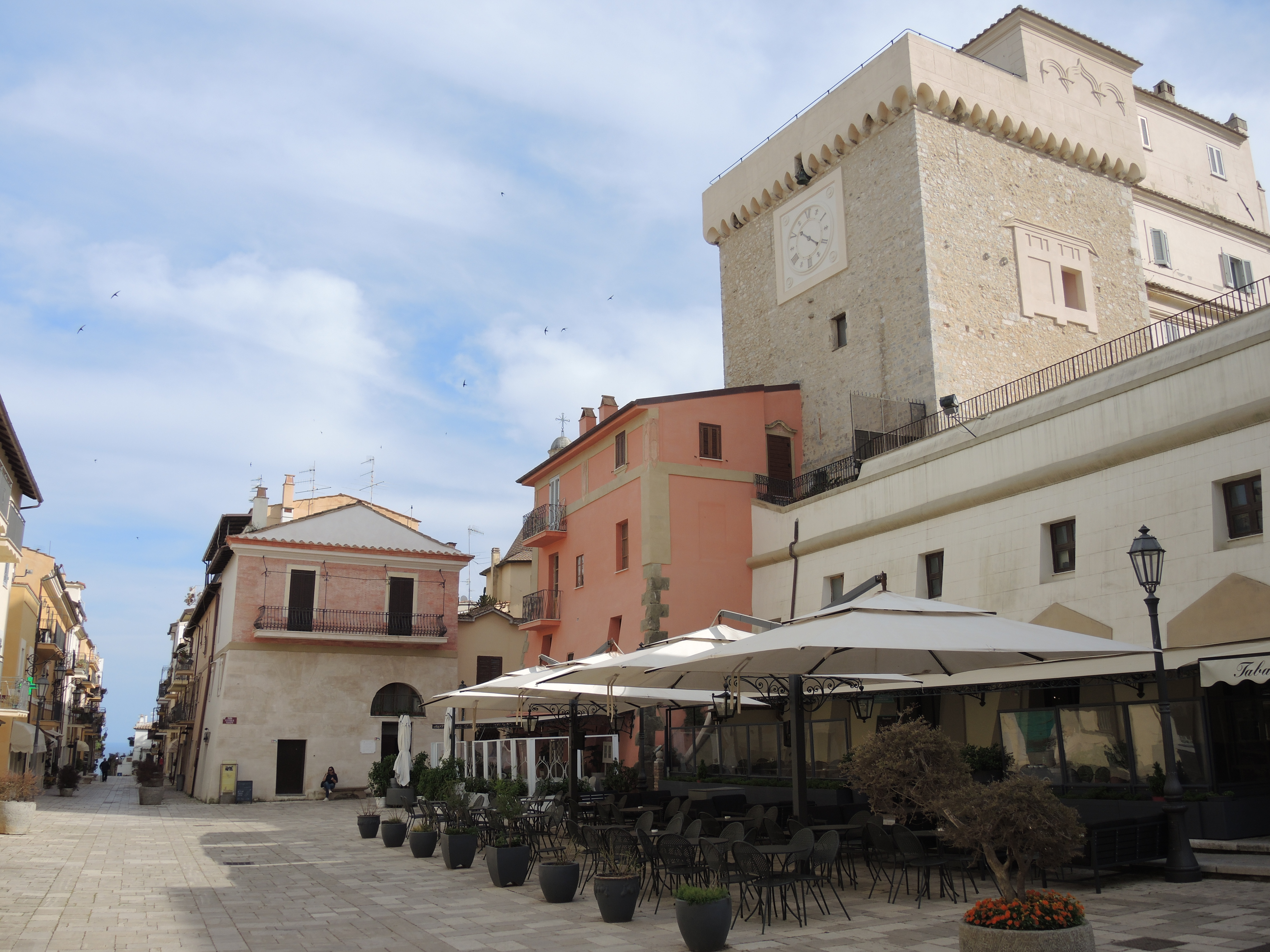
San Felice Circeo

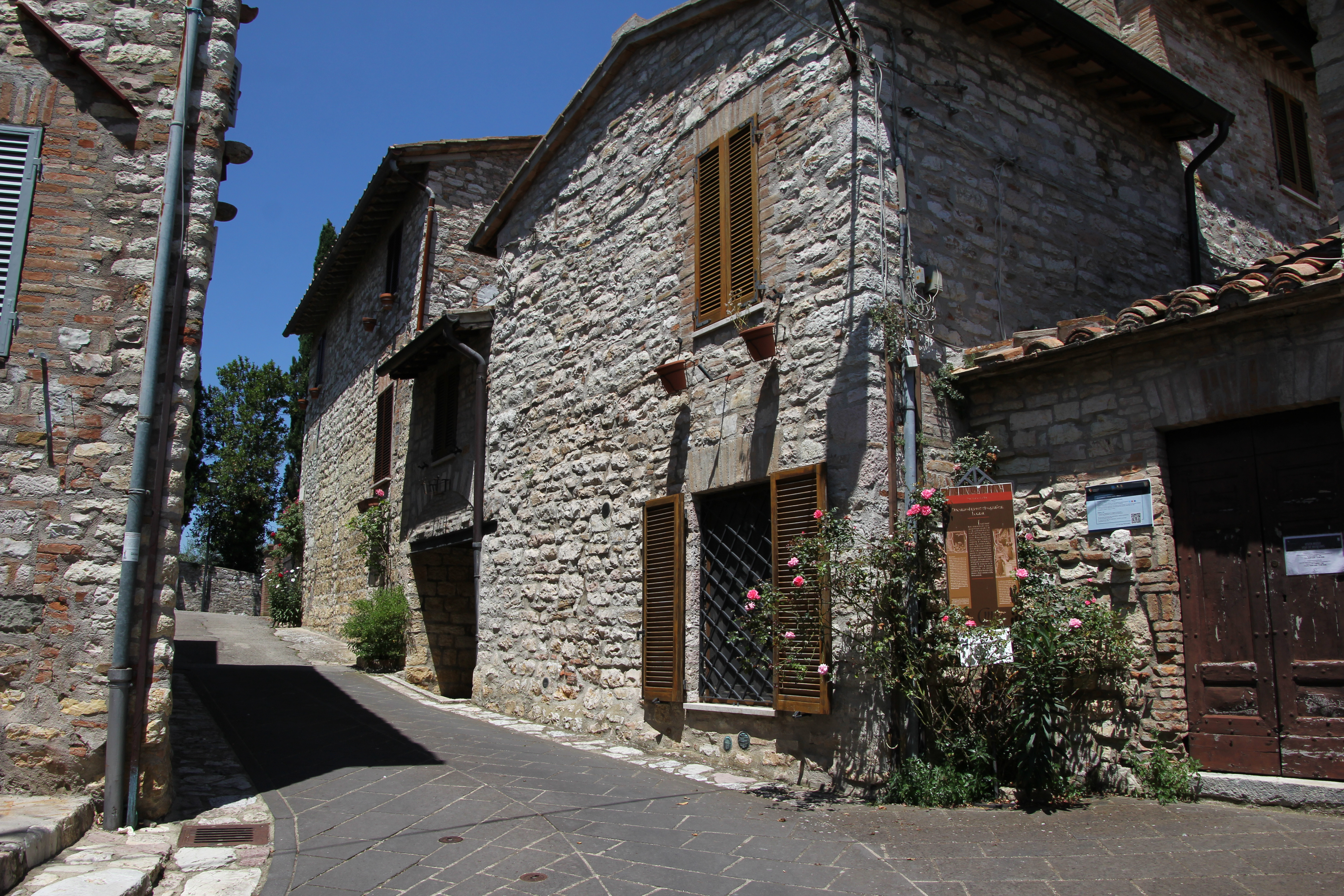
Corciano

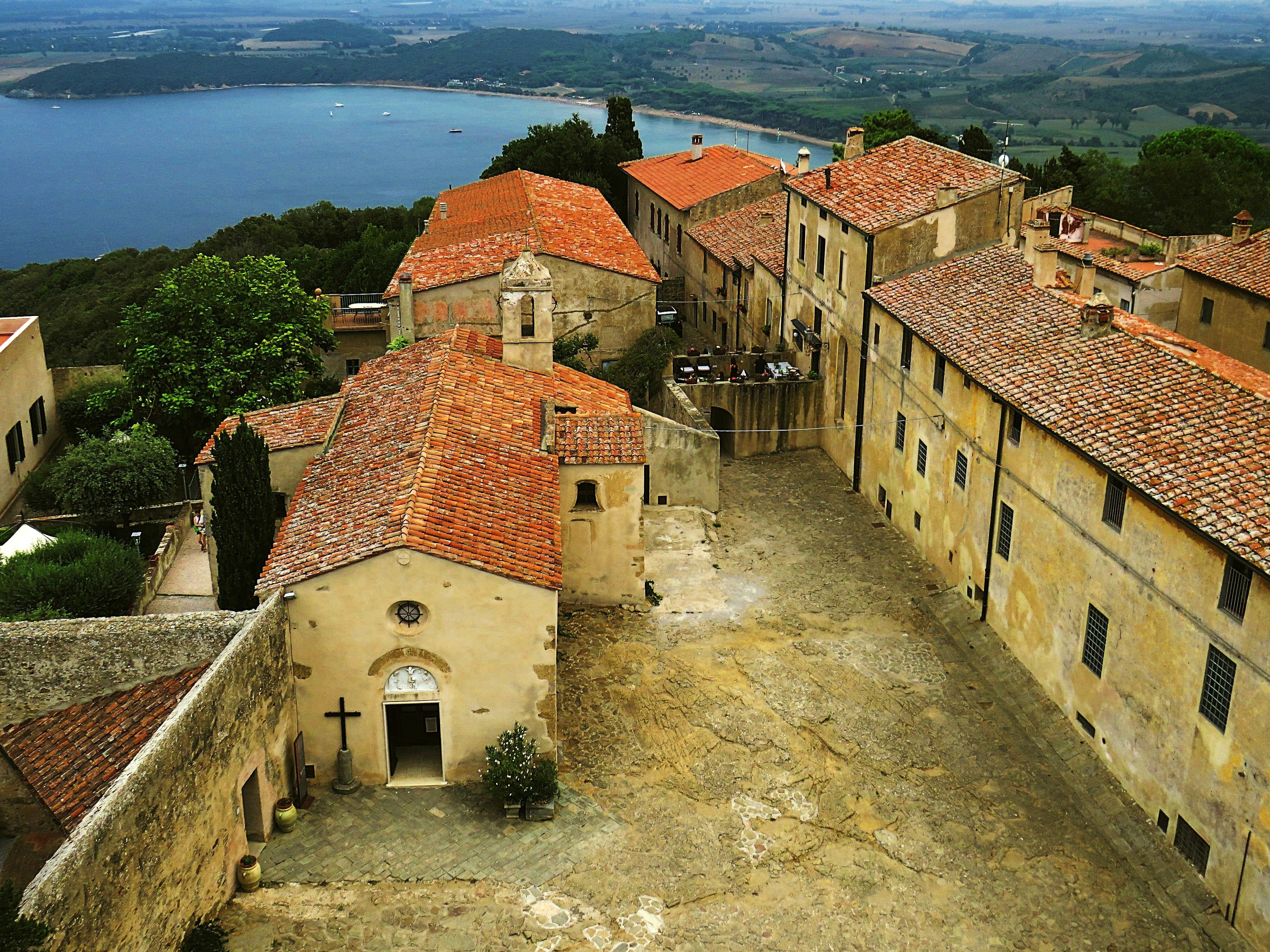
Populonia

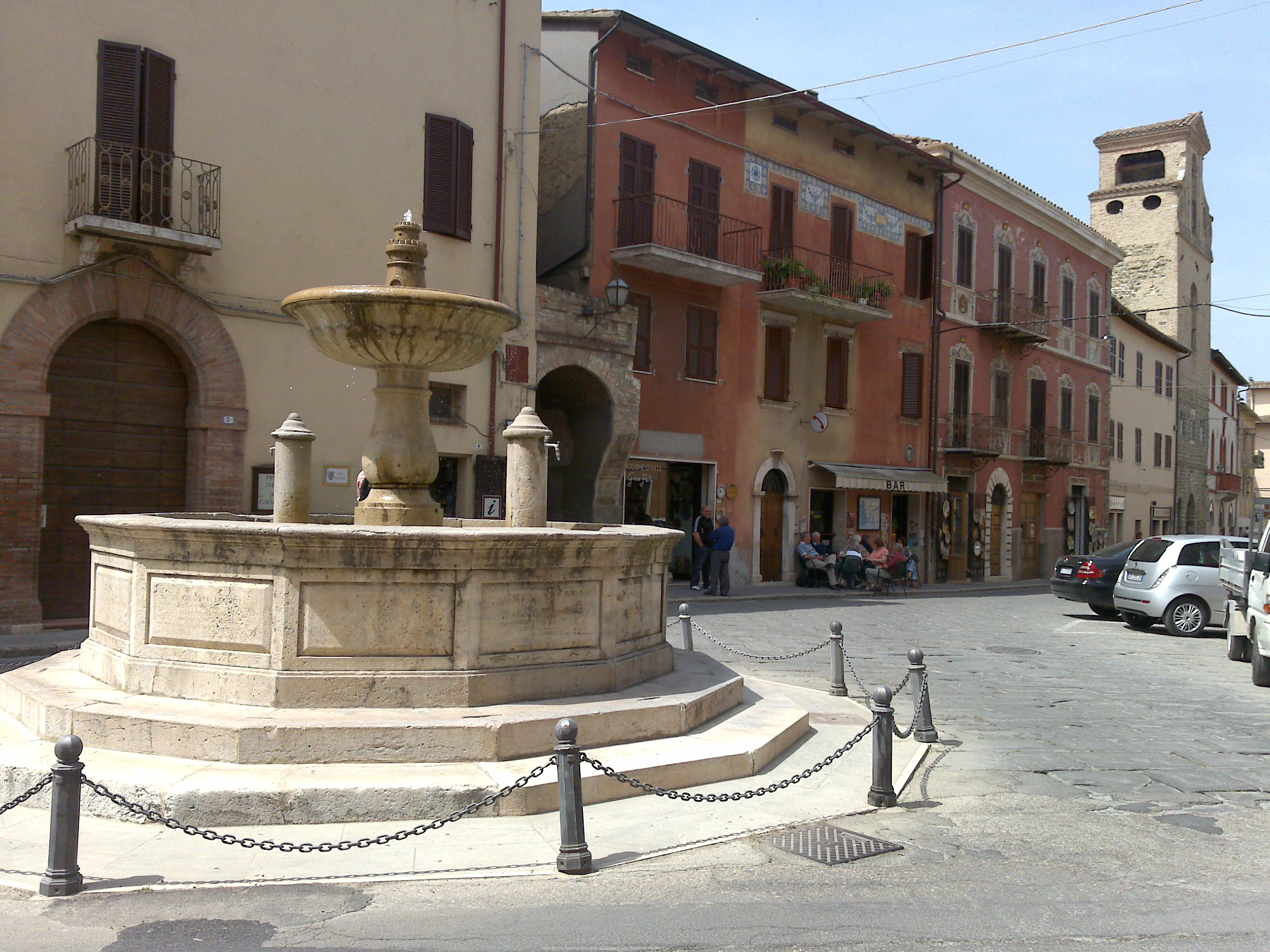
Deruta

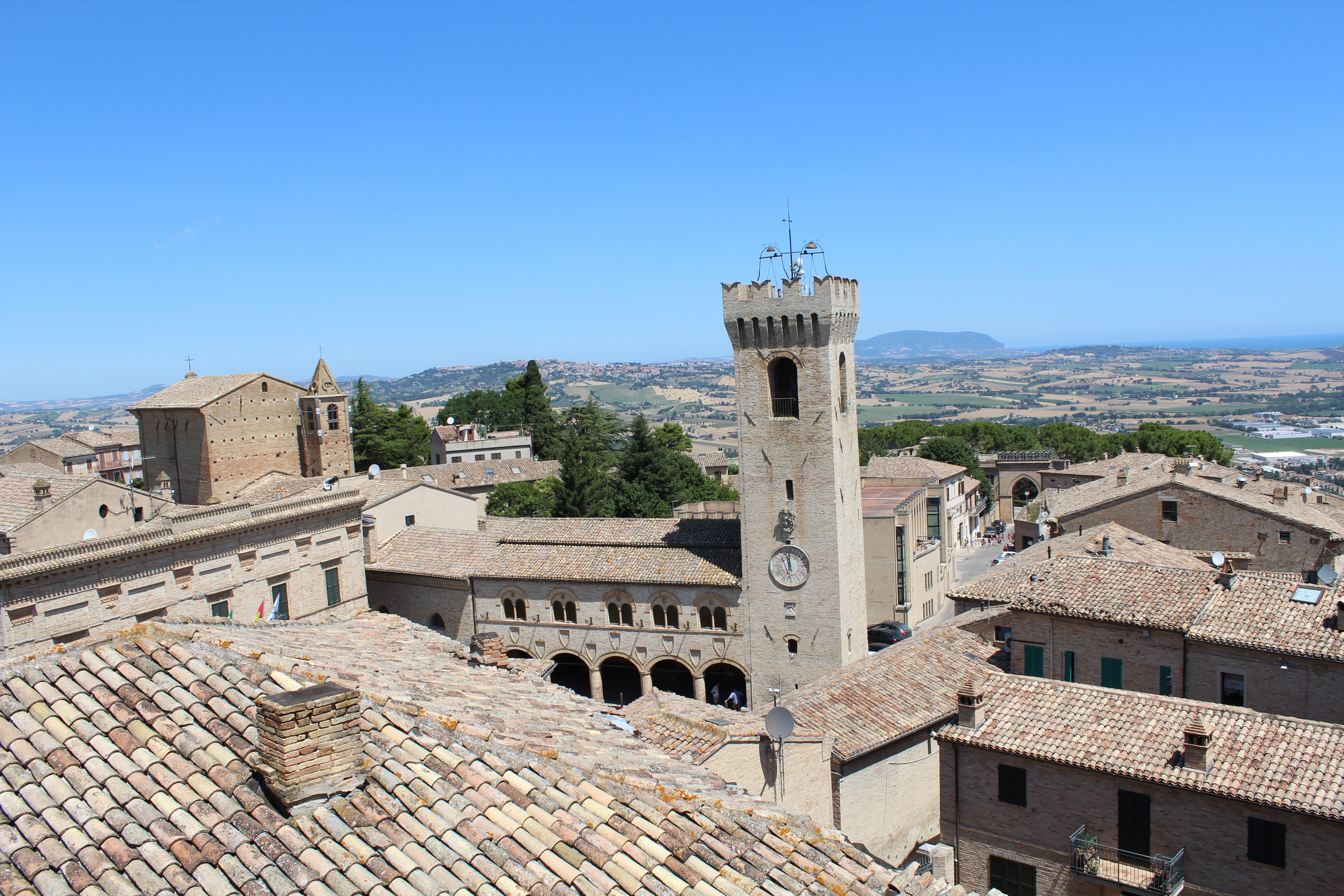
Montelupone

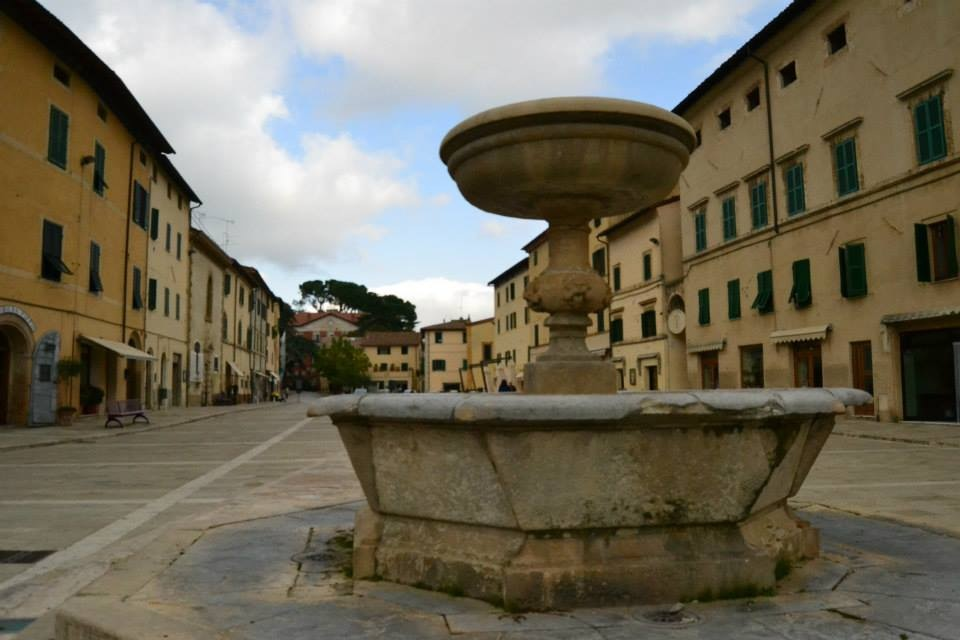
Cetona

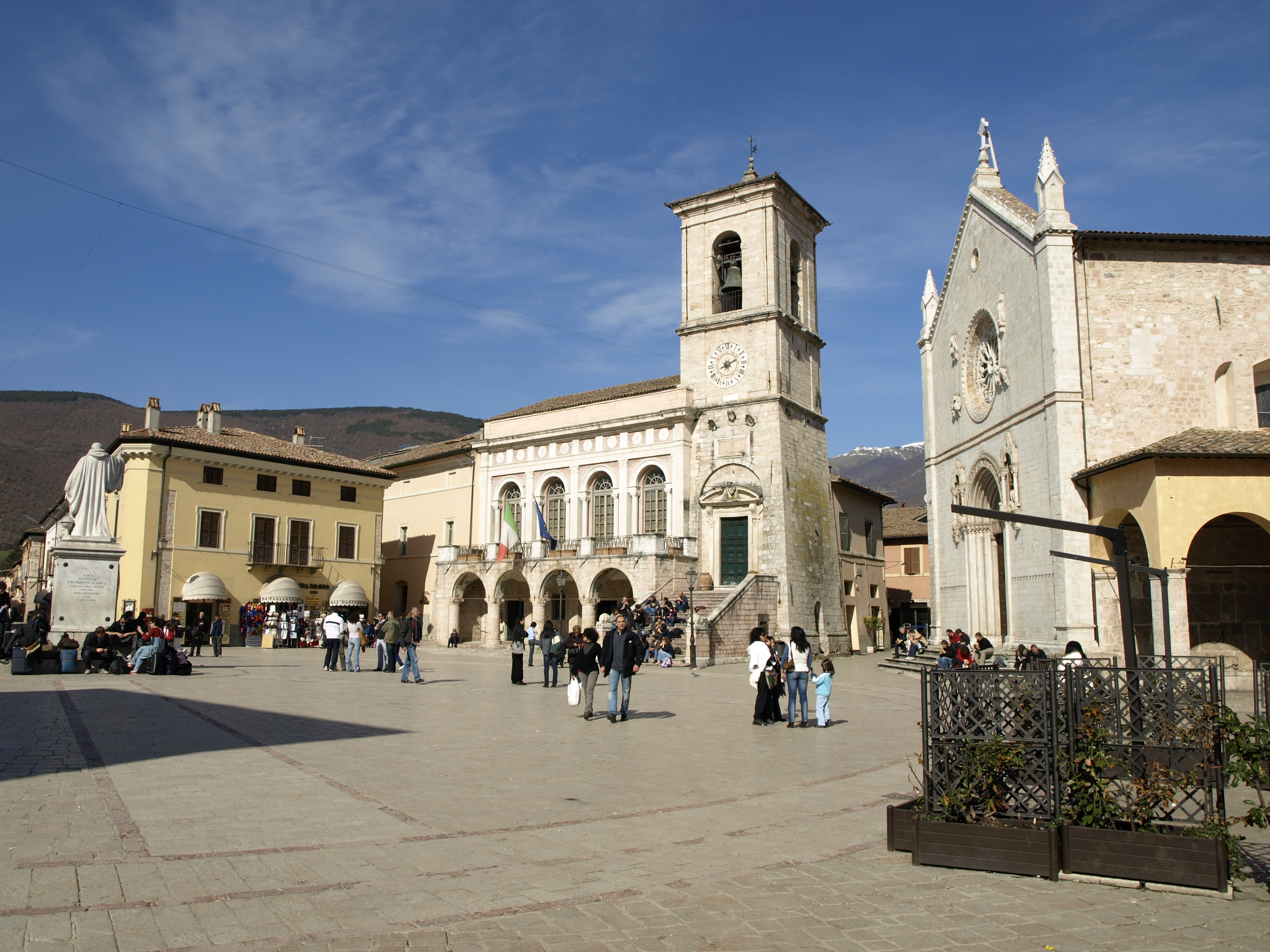
Norcia

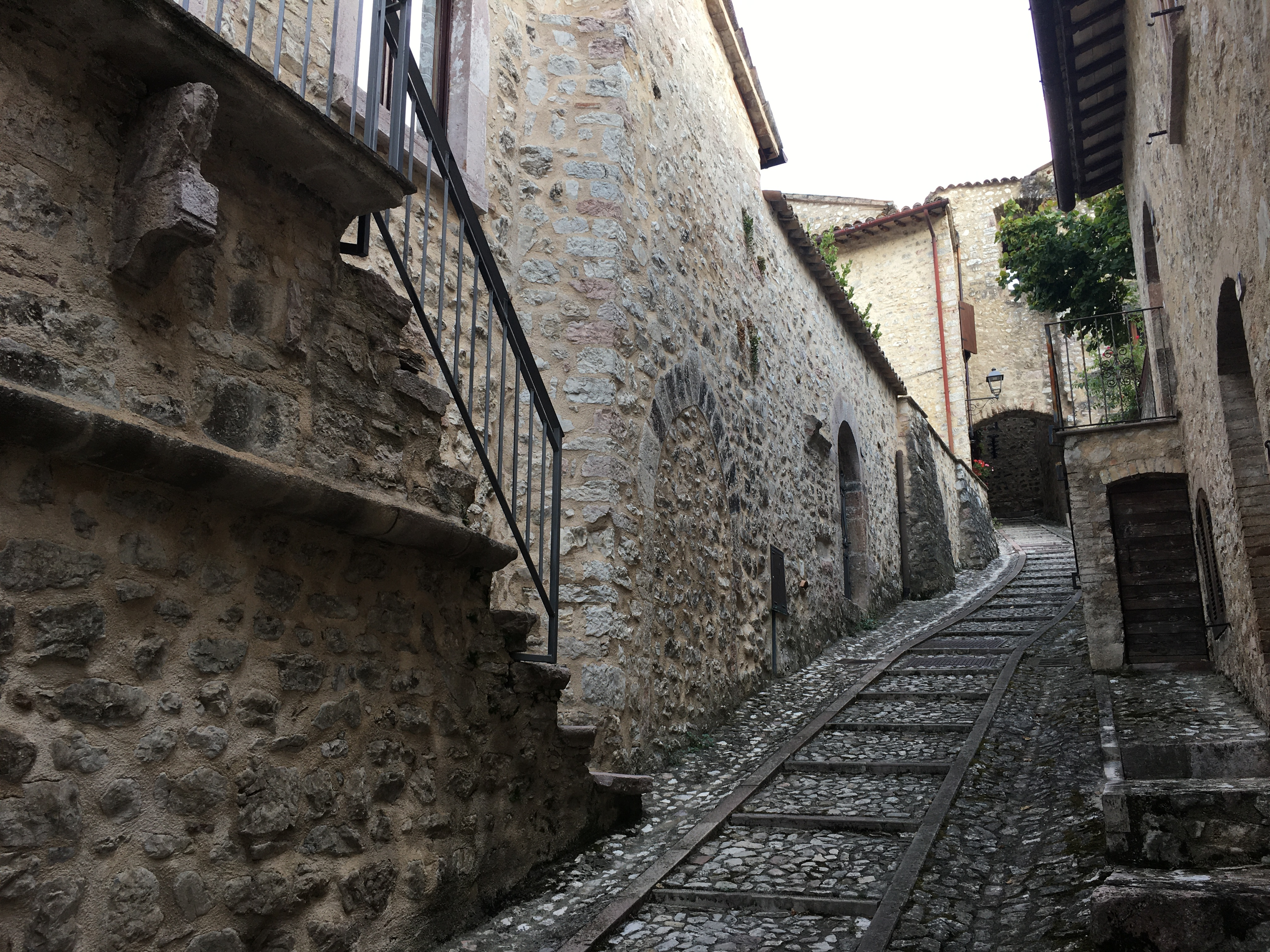
Vallo di Nera

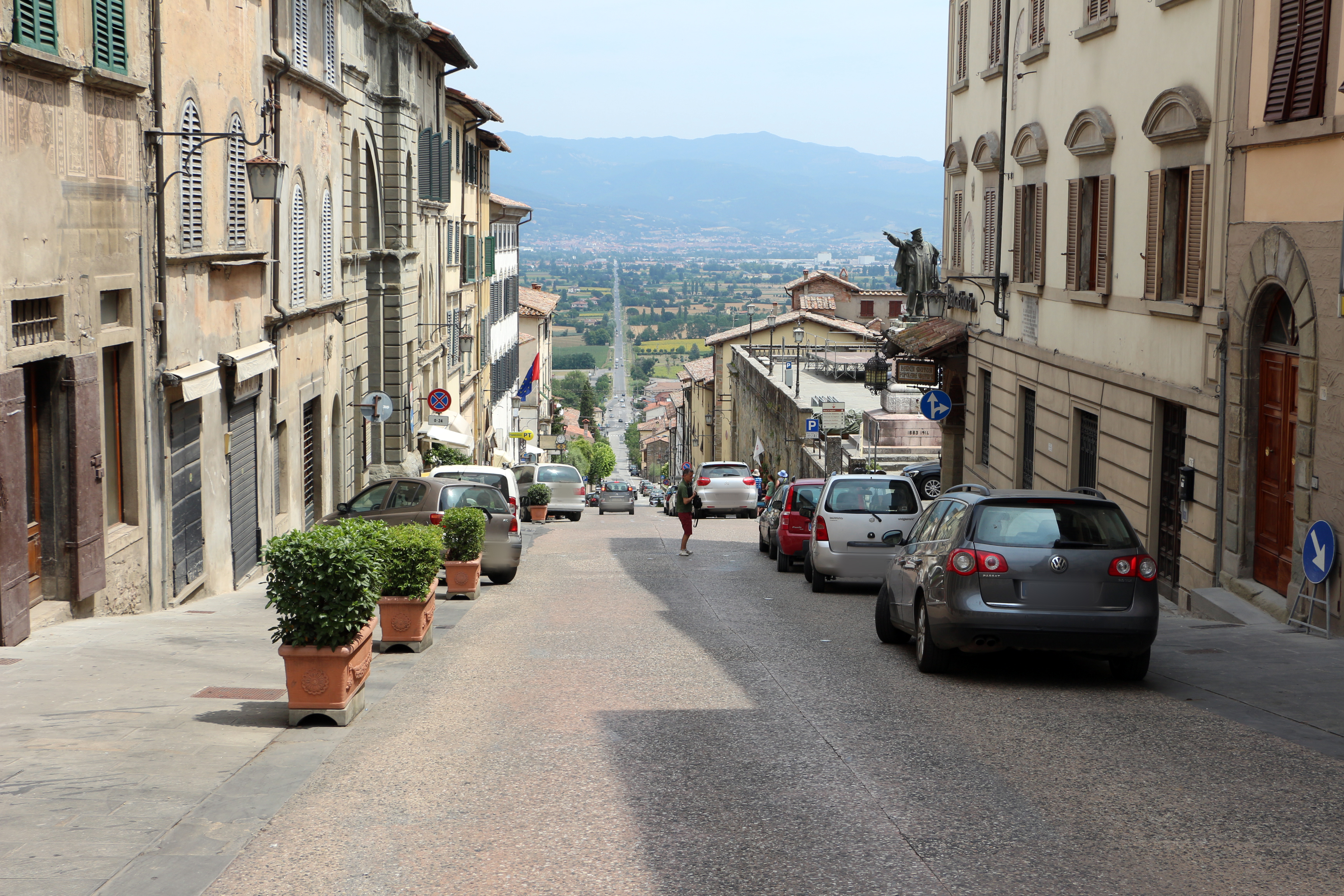
Anghiari

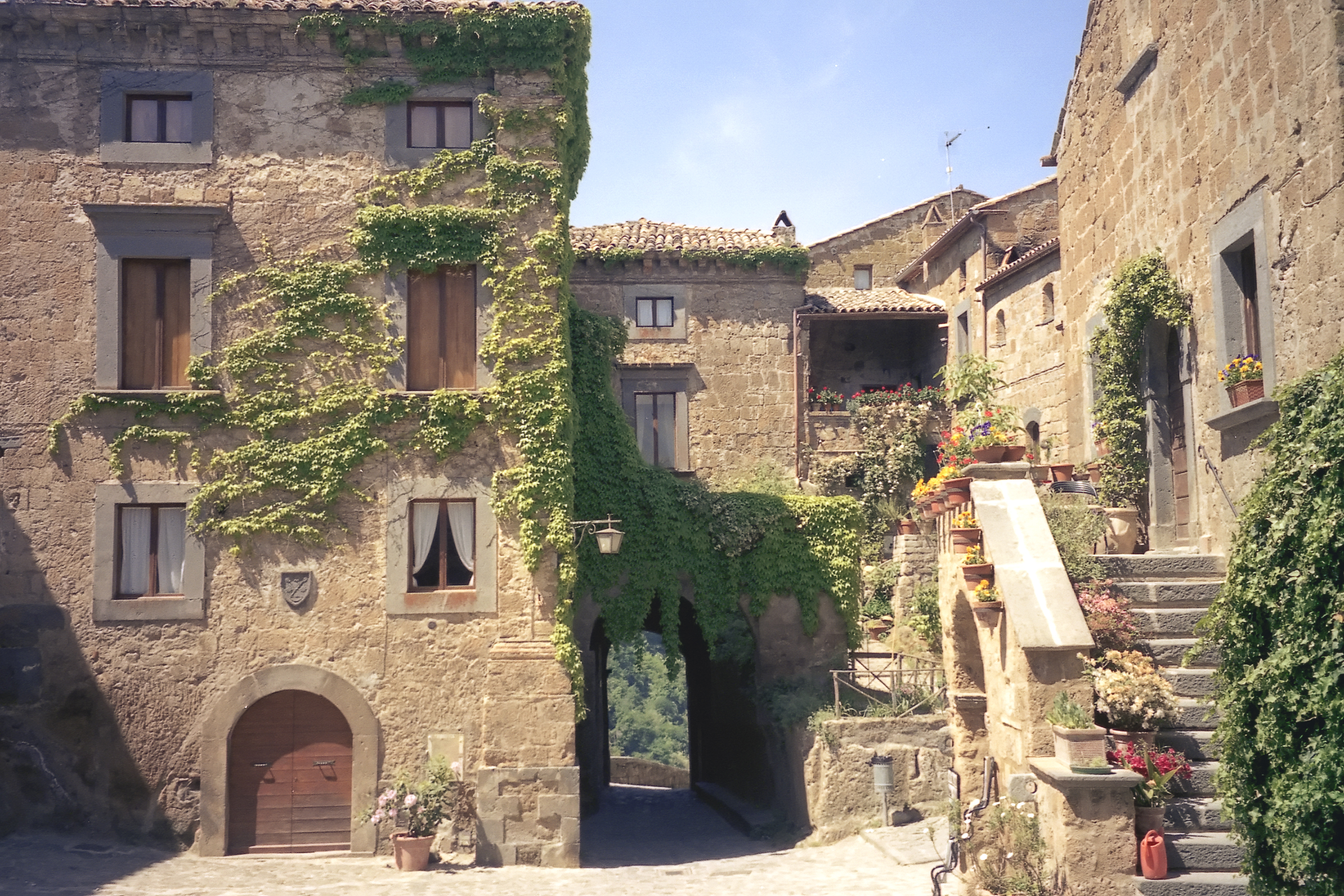
Civita di Bagnoregio

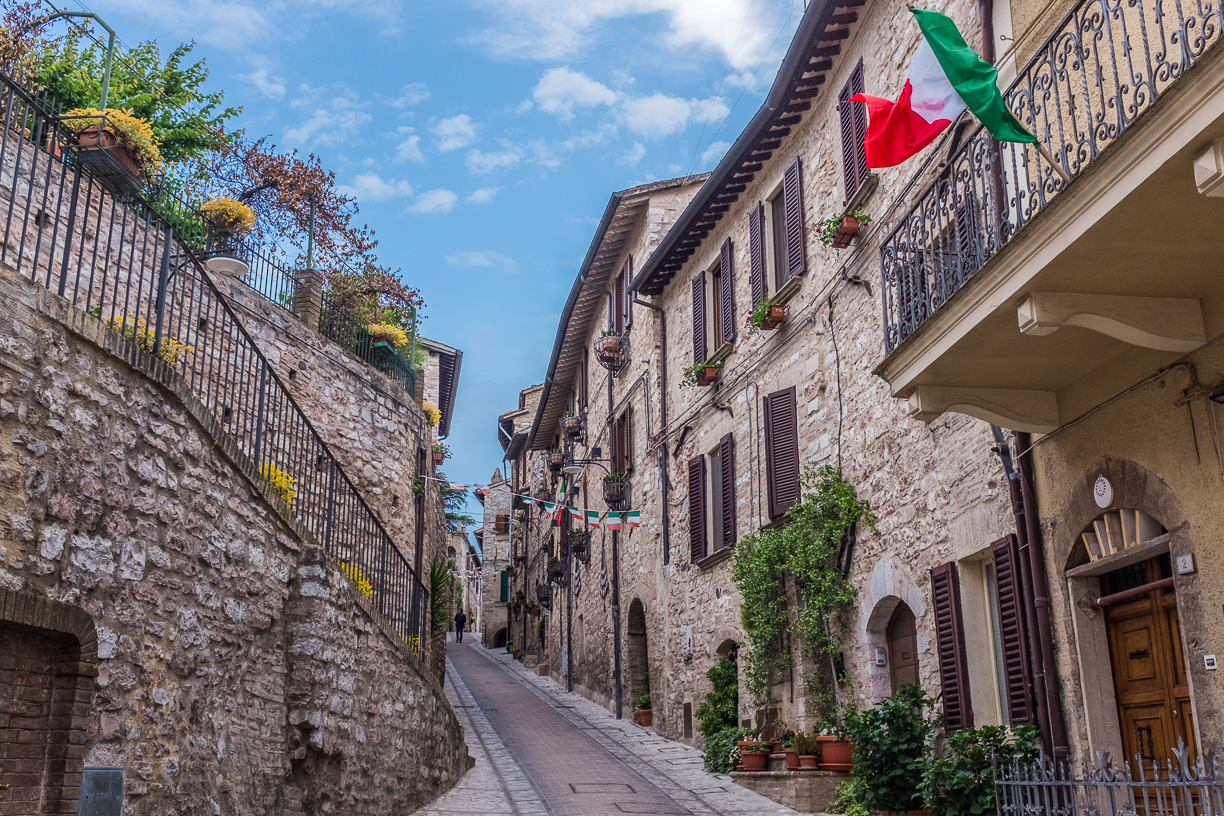
Spello

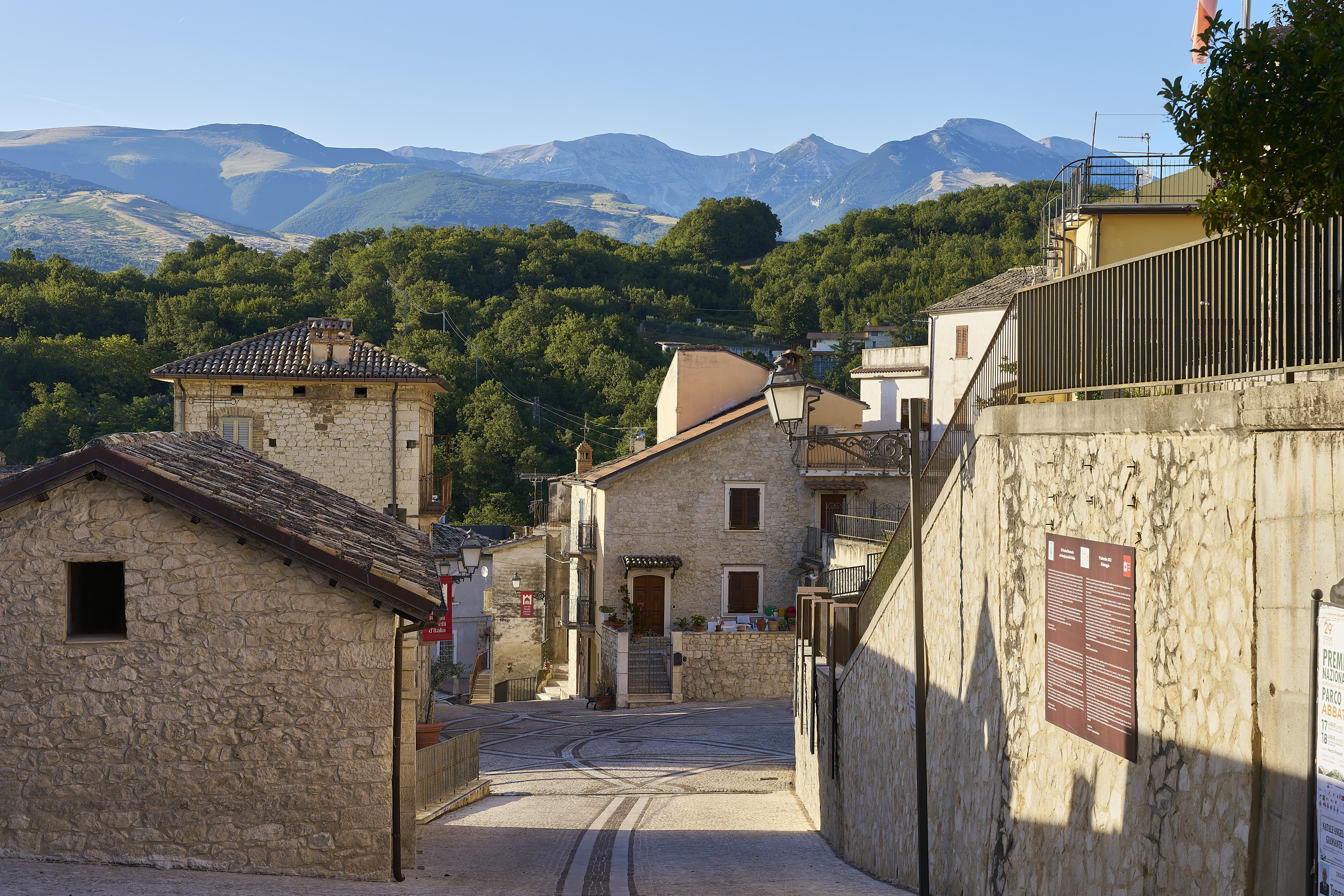
Abbateggio

- Abruzzo (26)
  - Abbateggio
  - Anversa degli Abruzzi
  - Bugnara
  - Campli
  - Caramanico Terme
  - Casoli
  - Castel del Monte
  - Castelli
  - Città Sant'Angelo
  - Civitella del Tronto
  - Crecchio
  - Guardiagrele
  - Navelli
  - Opi
  - Pacentro
  - Palena
  - Penne
  - Pescocostanzo
  - Pettorano sul Gizio
  - Pietracamela
  - Pretoro
  - Rocca San Giovanni
  - Santo Stefano di Sessanio
  - Scanno
  - Tagliacozzo
  - Villalago
- Lazio (25)
  - Amatrice
  - Atina
  - Bassano in Teverina
  - Boville Ernica
  - Castel di Tora
  - Castel Gandolfo
  - Castel San Pietro Romano
  - Castelnuovo di Porto
  - Castro dei Volsci
  - Civita di Bagnoregio
  - Collalto Sabino
  - Foglia
  - Gaeta
  - Greccio
  - Nemi
  - Orvinio
  - Percile
  - Pico
  - Ronciglione
  - San Felice Circeo
  - Sperlonga
  - Subiaco
  - Sutri
  - Torre Alfina
  - Vitorchiano
- Marche (31)
  - Arcevia
  - Cingoli
  - Corinaldo
  - Esanatoglia
  - Fiorenzuola di Focara
  - Frontino
  - Gradara
  - Grottammare
  - Macerata Feltria
  - Mercatello sul Metauro
  - Mondavio
  - Mondolfo
  - Monte Grimano
  - Montecassiano
  - Montecosaro
  - Montefabbri
  - Montefiore dell'Aso
  - Montelupone
  - Monteprandone
  - Moresco
  - Morro d'Alba
  - Offagna
  - Offida
  - Pergola
  - Petritoli
  - San Ginesio
  - Sarnano
  - Sassoferrato
  - Servigliano
  - Treia
  - Visso
- Molise (4)
  - Fornelli
  - Frosolone
  - Oratino
  - Sepino
- Tuscany (29)
  - Anghiari
  - Barga
  - Buonconvento
  - Campiglia Marittima
  - Capalbio
  - Casale Marittimo
  - Castelfranco di Sopra
  - Castiglione di Garfagnana
  - Cetona
  - Coreglia Antelminelli
  - Giglio Castello
  - Loro Ciuffenna
  - Lucignano
  - Montaione
  - Montefioralle
  - Montemerano
  - Montescudaio
  - Ortignano Raggiolo
  - Palazzuolo sul Senio
  - Pitigliano
  - Poppi
  - Populonia
  - Porto Ercole
  - San Casciano dei Bagni
  - San Donato in Poggio
  - Santa Fiora
  - Scarperia e San Piero
  - Sovana
  - Suvereto
- Umbria (31)
  - Acquasparta
  - Allerona
  - Arrone
  - Bettona
  - Bevagna
  - Castiglione del Lago
  - Citerna
  - Corciano
  - Deruta
  - Giano dell'Umbria
  - Lugnano in Teverina
  - Massa Martana
  - Monte Castello di Vibio
  - Montecchio
  - Montefalco
  - Monteleone d'Orvieto
  - Monteleone di Spoleto
  - Montone
  - Nocera Umbra
  - Norcia
  - Paciano
  - Panicale
  - Passignano sul Trasimeno
  - Preci
  - San Gemini
  - Sellano
  - Spello
  - Stroncone
  - Torgiano
  - Trevi
  - Vallo di Nera

=== Southern Italy ===
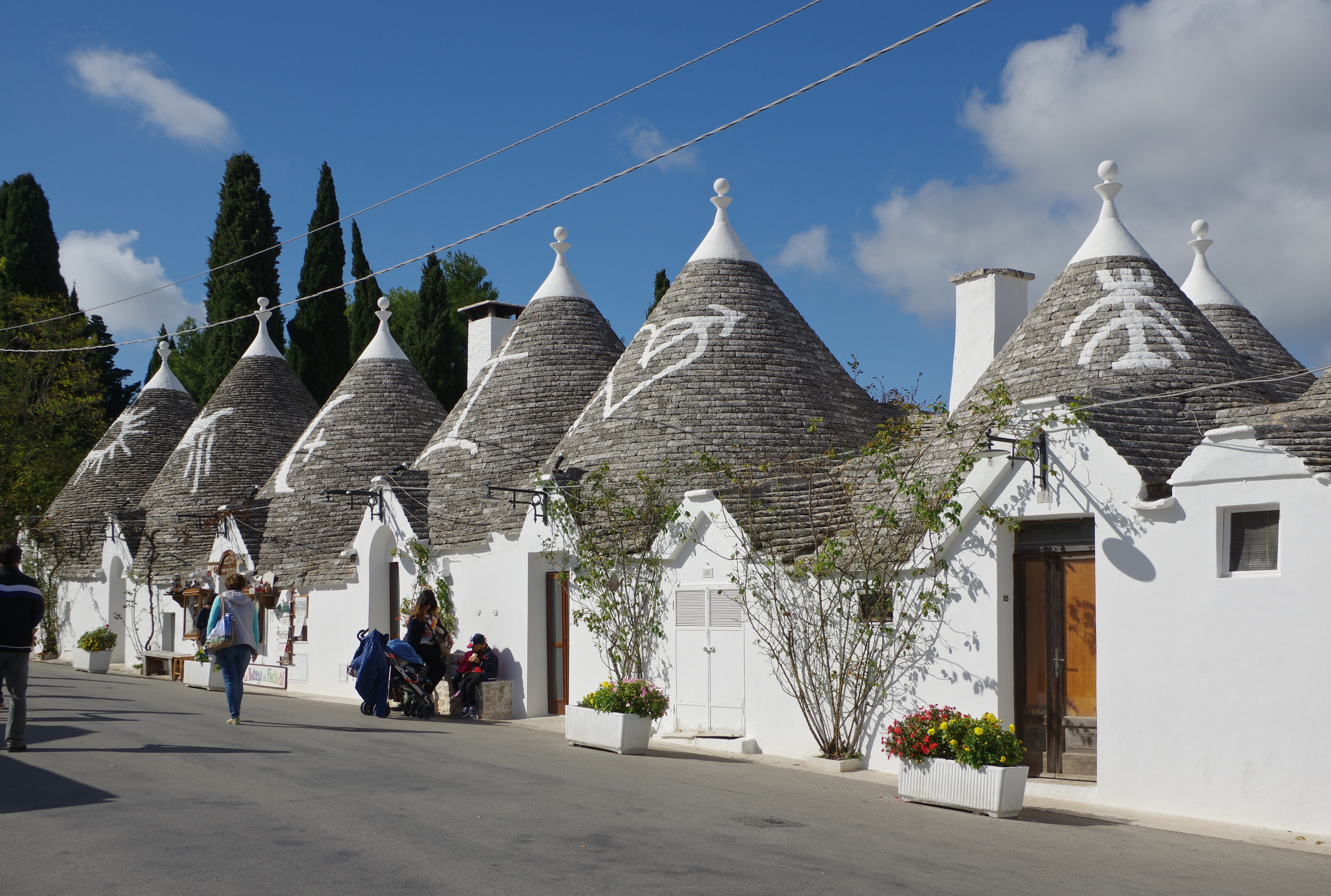
Alberobello

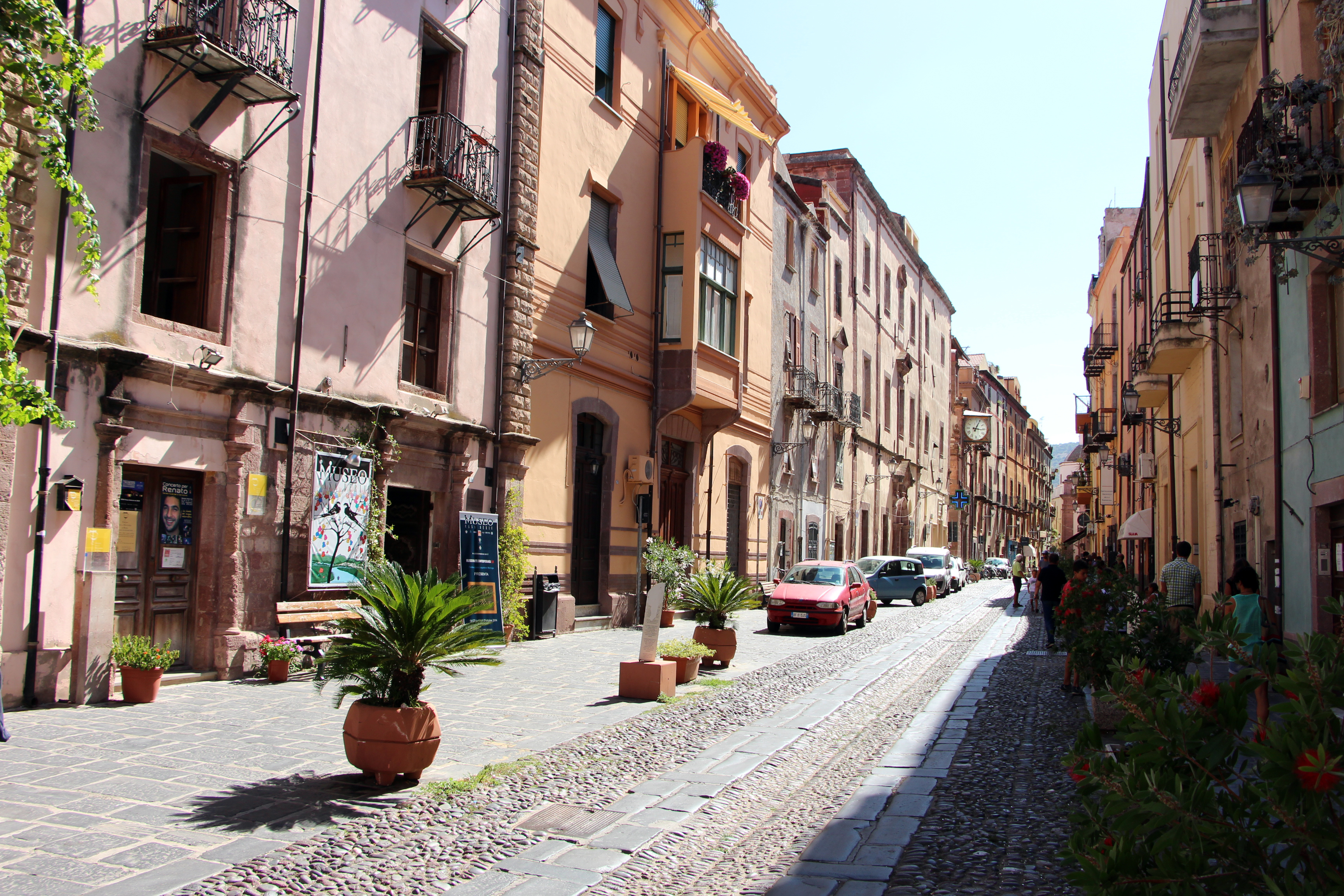
Bosa

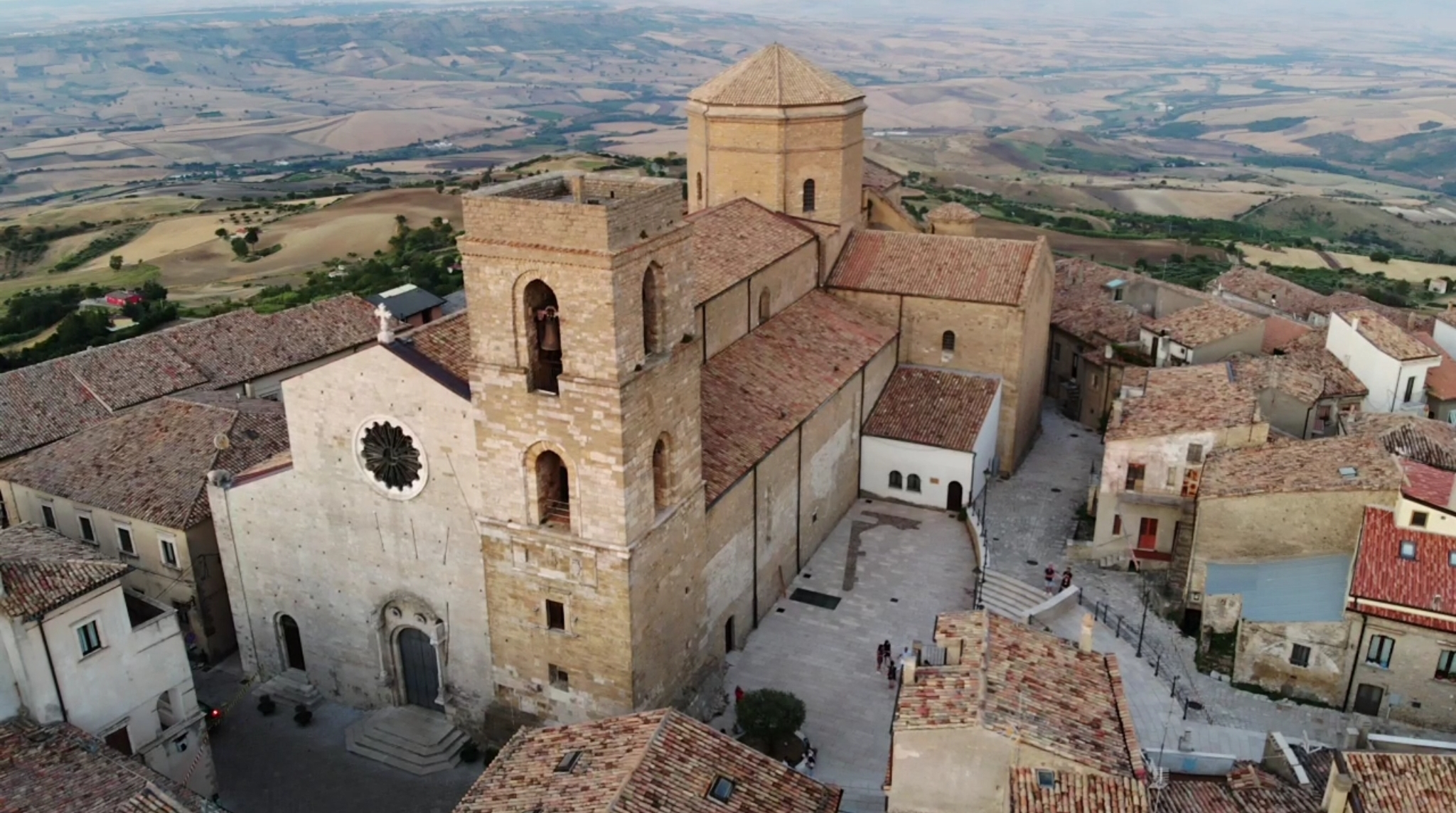
Acerenza

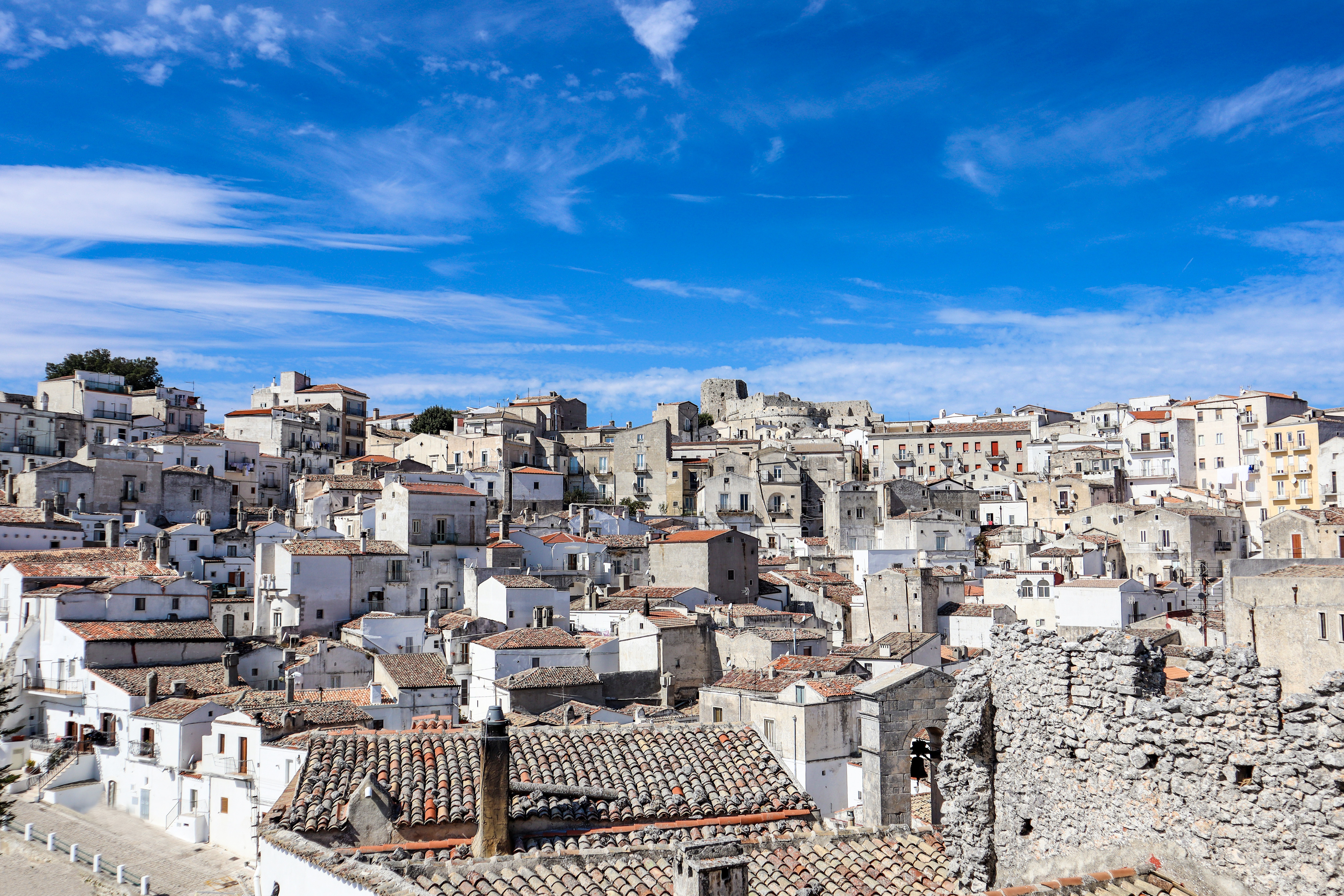
Monte Sant'Angelo

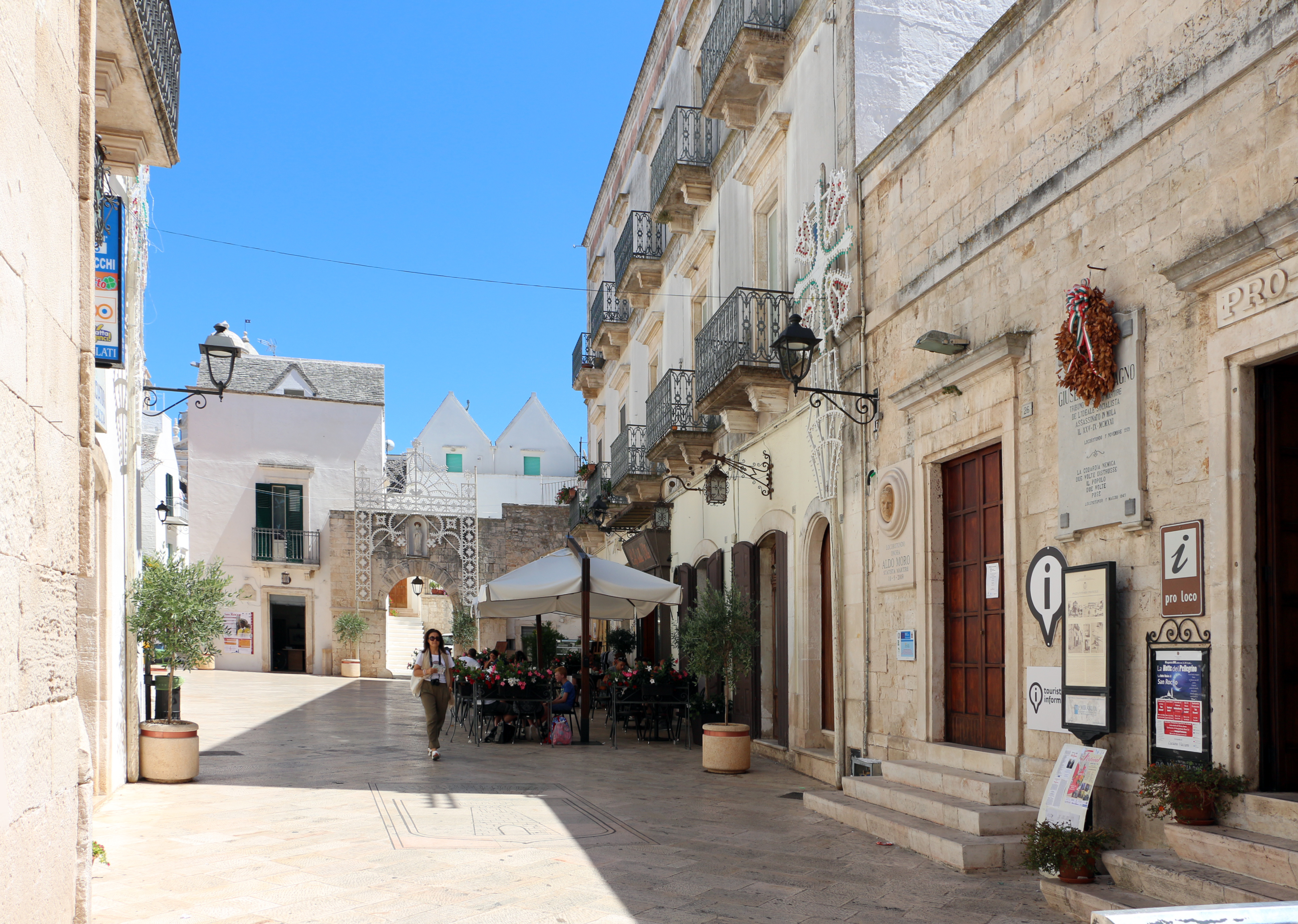
Locorotondo

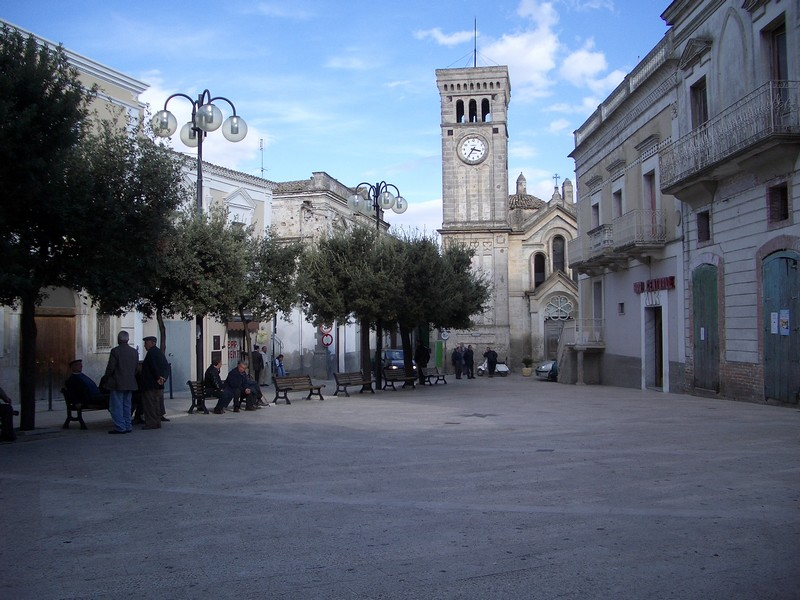
Miglionico

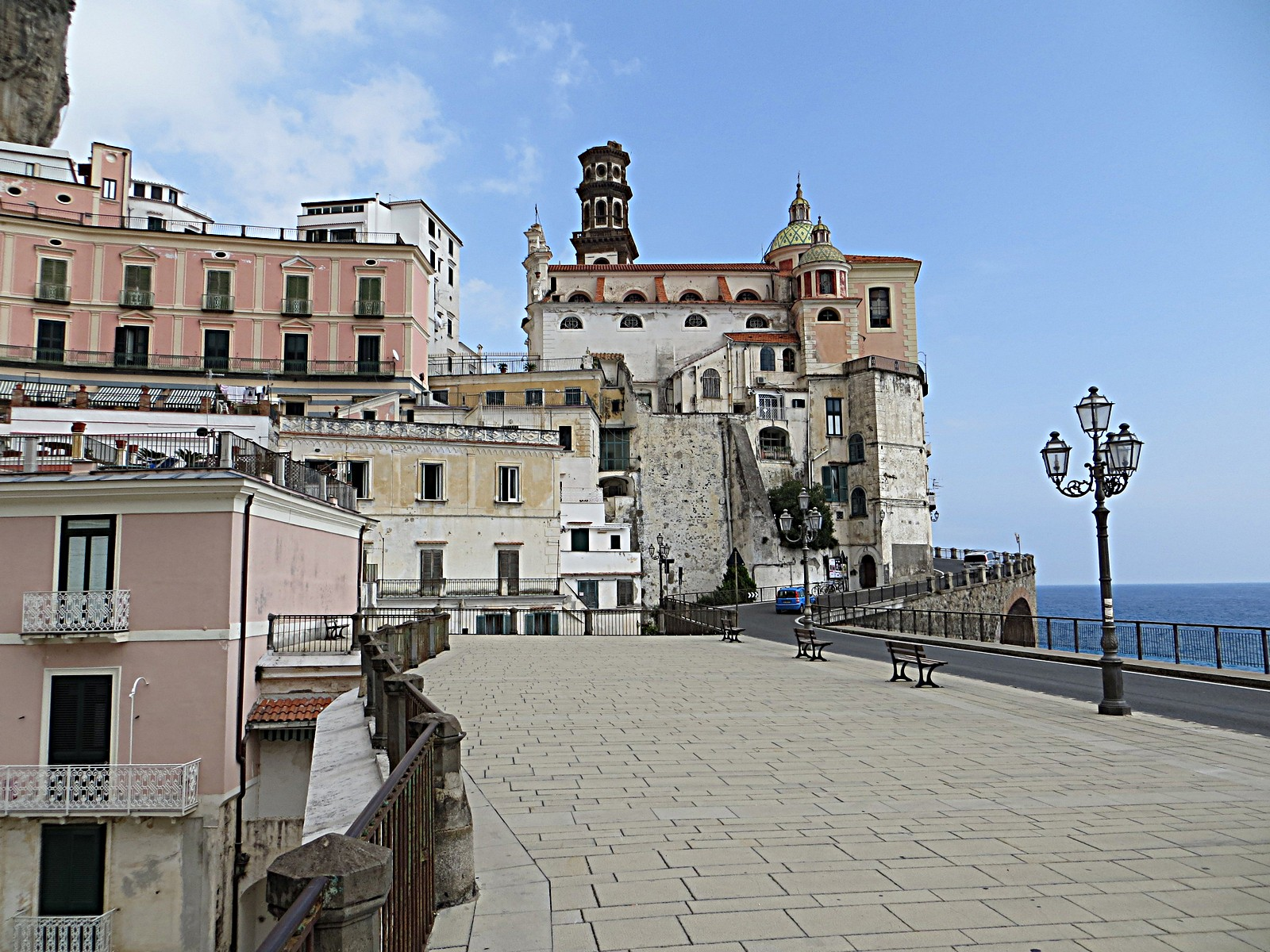
Atrani

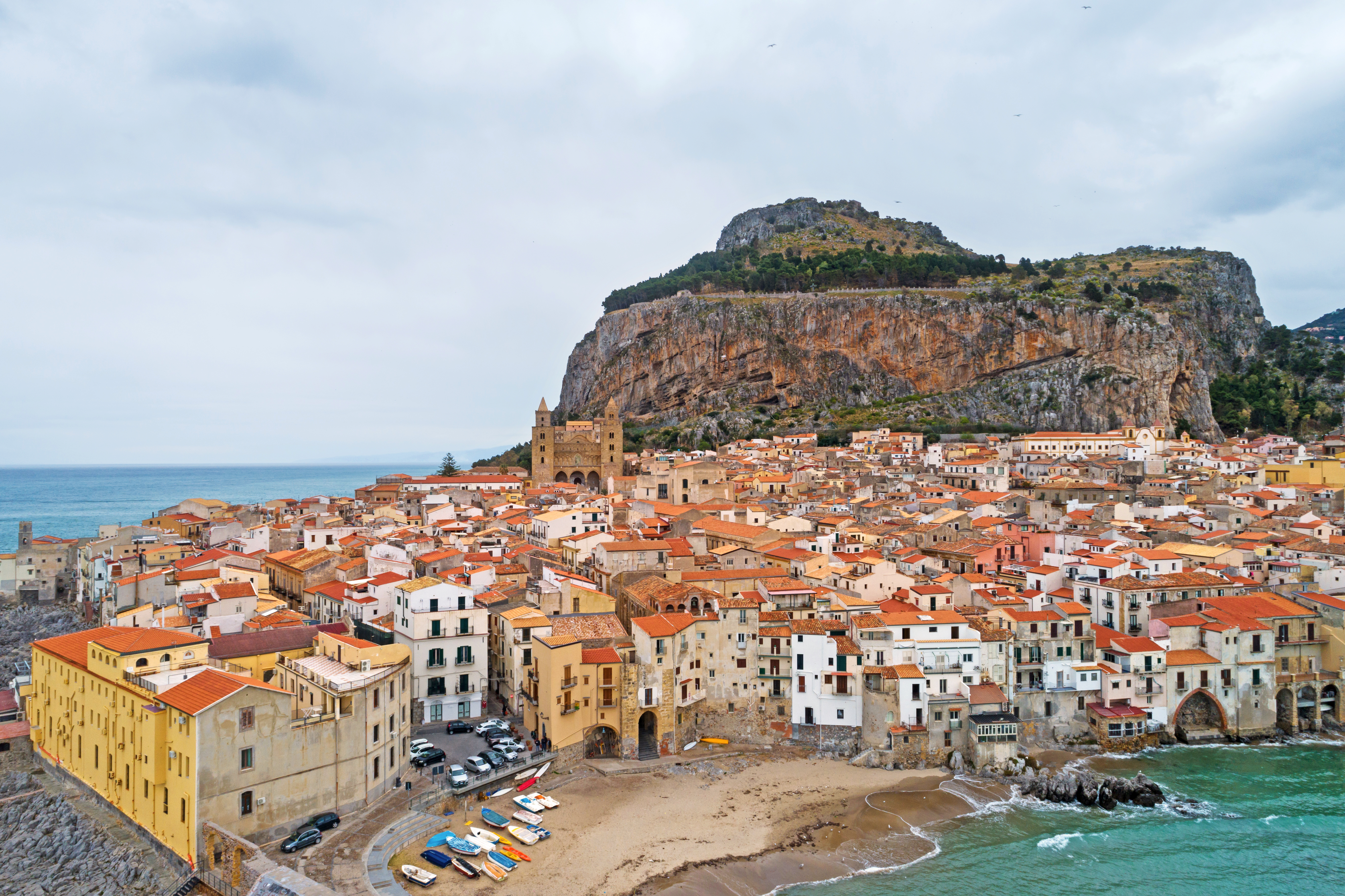
Cefalù

- Apulia (14)
  - Alberobello
  - Alberona
  - Bovino
  - Cisternino
  - Locorotondo
  - Maruggio
  - Monte Sant'Angelo
  - Otranto
  - Pietramontecorvino
  - Presicce
  - Roseto Valfortore
  - Sammichele di Bari
  - Specchia
  - Vico del Gargano
- Basilicata (9)
  - Acerenza
  - Castelmezzano
  - Guardia Perticara
  - Irsina
  - Maratea
  - Miglionico
  - Pietrapertosa
  - Venosa
  - Viggianello
- Calabria (15)
  - Aieta
  - Altomonte
  - Badolato
  - Bova
  - Buonvicino
  - Caccuri
  - Chianalea
  - Civita
  - Fiumefreddo Bruzio
  - Gerace
  - Morano Calabro
  - Oriolo
  - Rocca Imperiale
  - Santa Severina
  - Stilo
  - Tropea
- Campania (11)
  - Albori
  - Atrani
  - Castellabate
  - Frigento
  - Gesualdo
  - Montesarchio
  - Monteverde
  - Nusco
  - Savignano Irpino
  - Summonte
  - Zungoli
- Sardinia (9)
  - Atzara
  - Bosa
  - Carloforte
  - Castelsardo
  - La Maddalena
  - Lollove
  - Posada
  - Sadali
  - Tempio Pausania
- Sicily (24)
  - Agira
  - Buccheri
  - Calascibetta
  - Castelmola
  - Castiglione di Sicilia
  - Castroreale
  - Cefalù
  - Erice
  - Ferla
  - Gangi
  - Geraci Siculo
  - Militello in Val di Catania
  - Montalbano Elicona
  - Monterosso Almo
  - Novara di Sicilia
  - Palazzolo Acreide
  - Petralia Soprana
  - Salemi
  - Sambuca di Sicilia
  - San Marco d'Alunzio
  - Savoca
  - Sperlinga
  - Sutera
  - Troina

== See also ==
- Bandiera arancione
- The Most Beautiful Villages in the World
