= Beverino =

Beverino Bevein
- Comune
- Comune di Beverino
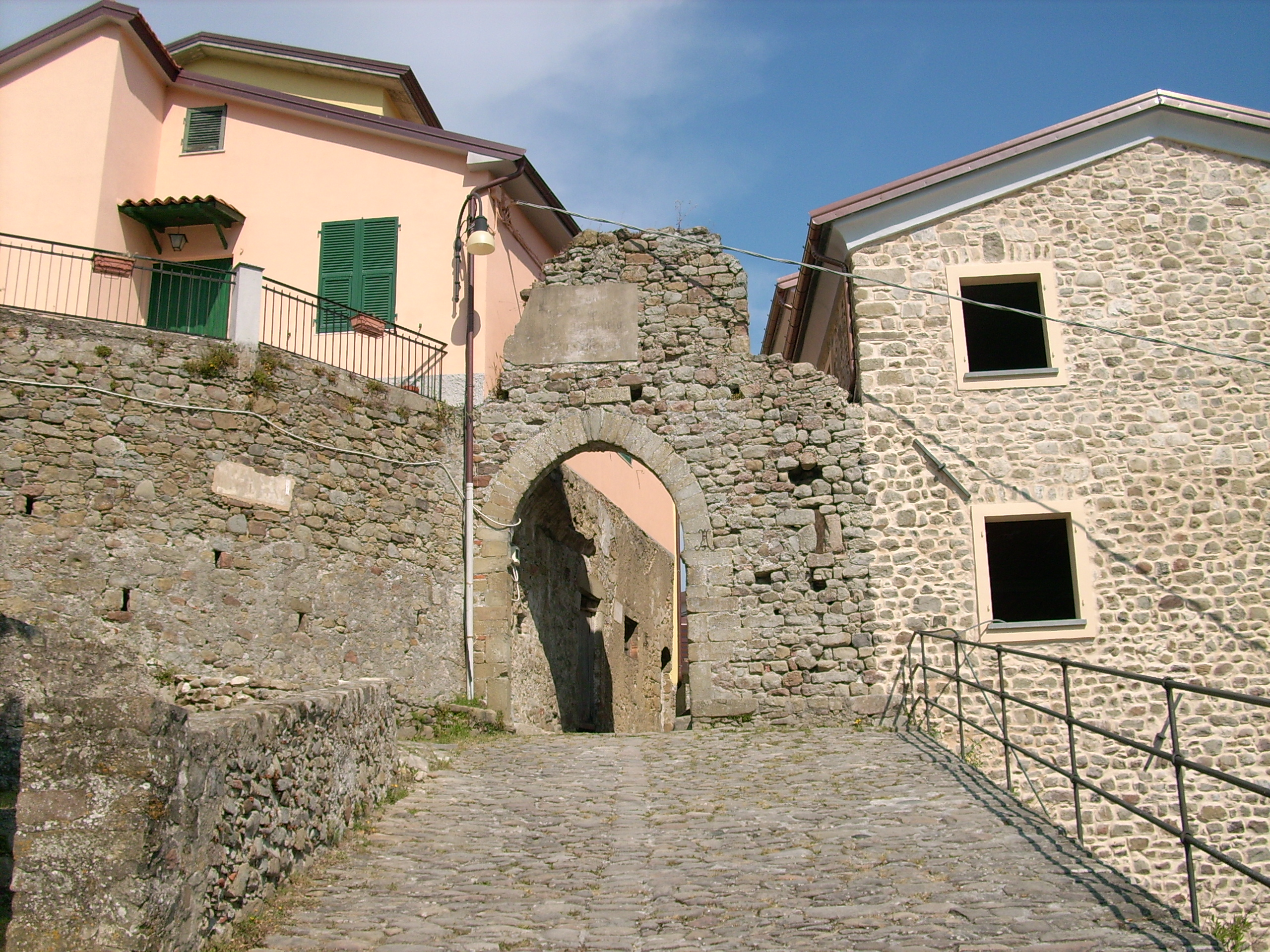
- View of the historical centre of Beverino.

- Coat of arms

- Location within Italy Location within Liguria
- Coordinates: 44°12′N 9°47′E
- Country: Italy
- Region: Liguria
- Province: La Spezia (SP)
- Frazioni: Bracelli, Castello, Castiglione Vara, Cavanella Vara, Corvara, Memola, Padivarma, San Cipriano

Government
  - Mayor: Andrea Costa

Area
  - Total: 36.01 km^{2} (13.90 sq mi)
- Elevation: 73 m (240 ft)

Population (31 December 2007)
  - Total: 2,339
  - Density: 64.95/km^{2} (168.2/sq mi)
- Demonym: Beverinesi
- Time zone: UTC+1 (CET)
  - Summer (DST): UTC+2 (CEST)
- Postal code: 19020
- Dialing code: 0187
- Patron saint: Santa Croce
- Saint day: September 14

Beverino (Ligurian: Bevein) is a comune (municipality) of c. 2,000 inhabitants in the province of La Spezia in the Italian region Liguria, located about 70 kilometres (43 mi) southeast of Genoa and about 11 kilometres (7 mi) north of La Spezia. It is part of the Vara river and of the Regional natural Park of Montemarcello-Magra.

Beverino borders the following municipalities: Borghetto di Vara, Calice al Cornoviglio, Follo, Pignone, Riccò del Golfo di Spezia, Rocchetta di Vara, Vernazza.

== History ==
Beverino was a possession of the Este family, who entrusted it as fief to the lord of the nearby Vezzano Ligure. In the 11th-13th century it was bitterly contended between the Malaspina family and the bishops of Luni.

In 1247 it became a free commune and entered the Republic of Genoa in 1274, however maintaining its legislative autonomy.

The frazione of Corvara was a dominion of the lords of Carpena and Ponzone, who, in 1211, ceded its fief to Genoa. Padivarma, a former possession of the bishopric of Luni, became part of the Genoese Republic in 1274 together with Beverino.

== Main sights ==
- Parish church of Santa Croce.
- Church of San Michele Arcangelo (14th century), in the frazione of Corvara.
- Villa Costa, a national monument.

== Demographic evolution ==
Historical population

Year	Pop.	±%
1861	3,036	—
1871	3,081	+1.5%
1881	3,267	+6.0%
1901	3,266	−0.0%
1911	3,252	−0.4%

Year	Pop.	±%
1921	3,213	−1.2%
1931	2,585	−19.5%
1936	2,718	+5.1%
1951	2,557	−5.9%
1961	2,259	−11.7%

Year	Pop.	±%
1971	2,101	−7.0%
1981	2,134	+1.6%
1991	2,174	+1.9%
2001	2,233	+2.7%

Source: Data from ISTAT

== Transport ==
Beverino is crossed by through the Provincial Road 18. The nearest railway station is that of La Spezia on the Genoa-Rome mainline.
