= Riccò del Golfo di Spezia =

- Comune
- Comune di Riccò del Golfo di Spezia
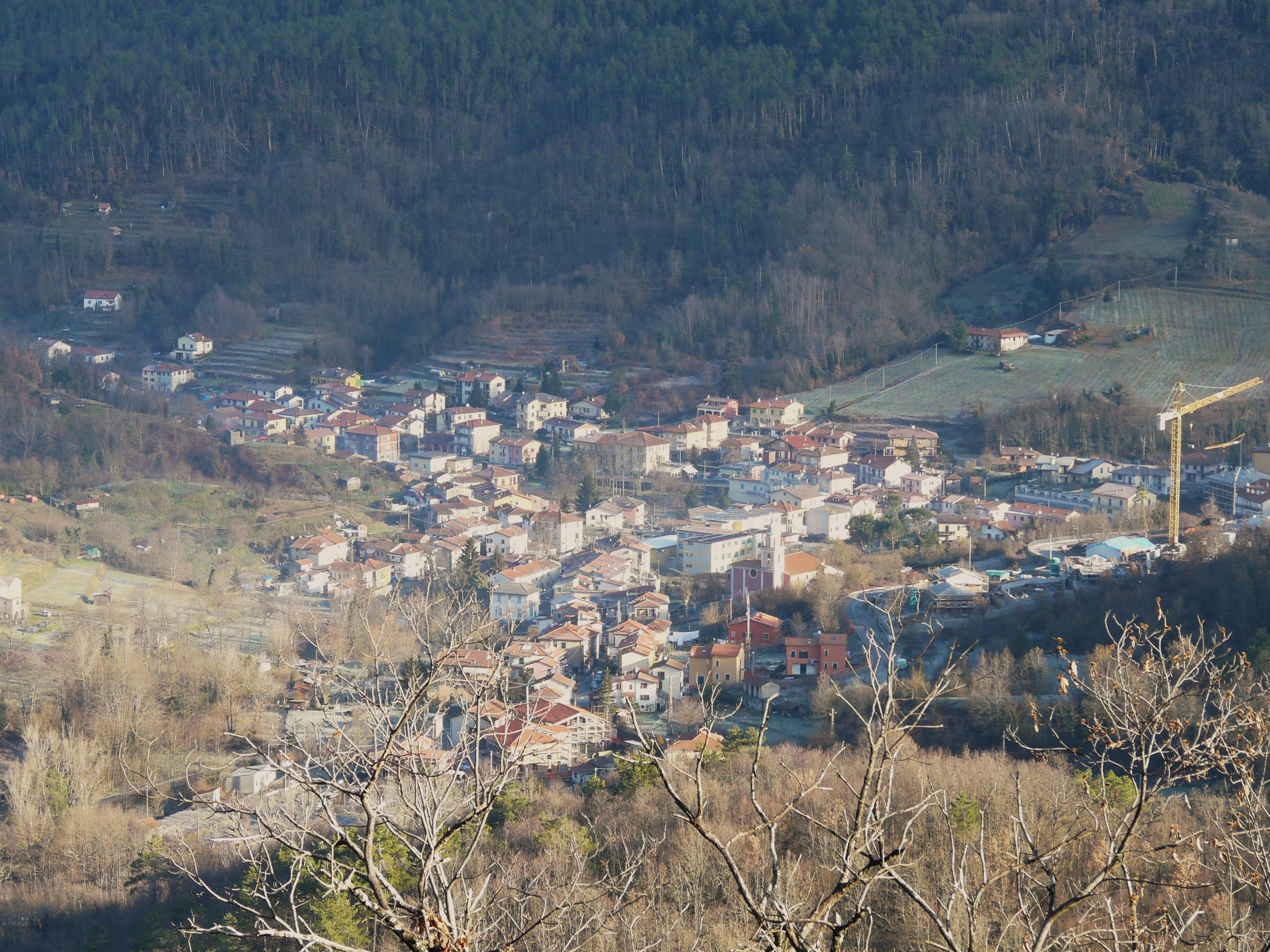
- Riccò del Golfo di Spezia

- Location within Italy Location within Liguria
- Coordinates: 44°11′N 9°52′E
- Country: Italy
- Region: Liguria
- Province: La Spezia (SP)
- Frazioni: Bovecchio, Camedone, Casella, Falabiana, Montecapri, Piandibarca, Polverara, Ponzò, Porcale, Quaratica, San Benedetto, Valdipino

Government
  - Mayor: Loris Figoli

Area
  - Total: 36.9 km^{2} (14.2 sq mi)
- Elevation: 148 m (486 ft)

Population (31 December 2015)
  - Total: 3,698
  - Density: 100/km^{2} (260/sq mi)
- Demonym: Riccolesi
- Time zone: UTC+1 (CET)
  - Summer (DST): UTC+2 (CEST)
- Postal code: 19020
- Dialing code: 0187
- Website: Official website

Riccò del Golfo di Spezia (Ligurian: Ricò, Latin: Ricotium) is a comune (municipality) in the Province of La Spezia in the Italian region Liguria, located about 80 kilometres (50 mi) southeast of Genoa and about 10 kilometres (6 mi) northeast of La Spezia.

== Physical geography ==
The territory of Riccò del Golfo lies in the southernmost part of the middle and lower val di Vara, in the minor valley of the Riccò affluent of the Vara River, behind the Gulf of La Spezia.

The territory is part of the Regional Nature Park of Montemarcello-Magra-Vara. A woodland path, which passes by the village of Casella and the Sella della Cigoletta, marked as number 7 by the CAI, affords a connection with Vernazza and thus the coast of the Cinque Terre.

== Infrastructure and transportation ==
=== Roads ===
The municipal territory of Riccò del Golfo di Spezia is crossed principally by the strada statale 1 Via Aurelia which affords a road link with Beverino, to the north, and the provincial capital La Spezia to the south. Further territorial road links include the provinciale 38 per Trezzo (Beverino) - which intersects with the Aurelia at the centre of Pian di Barca - and the provinciale 17, at the San Benedetto junction on the statale 1, which leads north into the municipal territory of Beverino.

=== Urban transportation ===
From the municipalities of Beverino, Brugnato, La Spezia, Sesta Godano and Varese Ligure, a local public transport system provides daily bus connections with Riccò del Golfo di Spezia and other villages within the municipal territory.
