= Corniglia =

Hamlet in Vernazza, Italy

Corniglia Curnigia
- Frazione
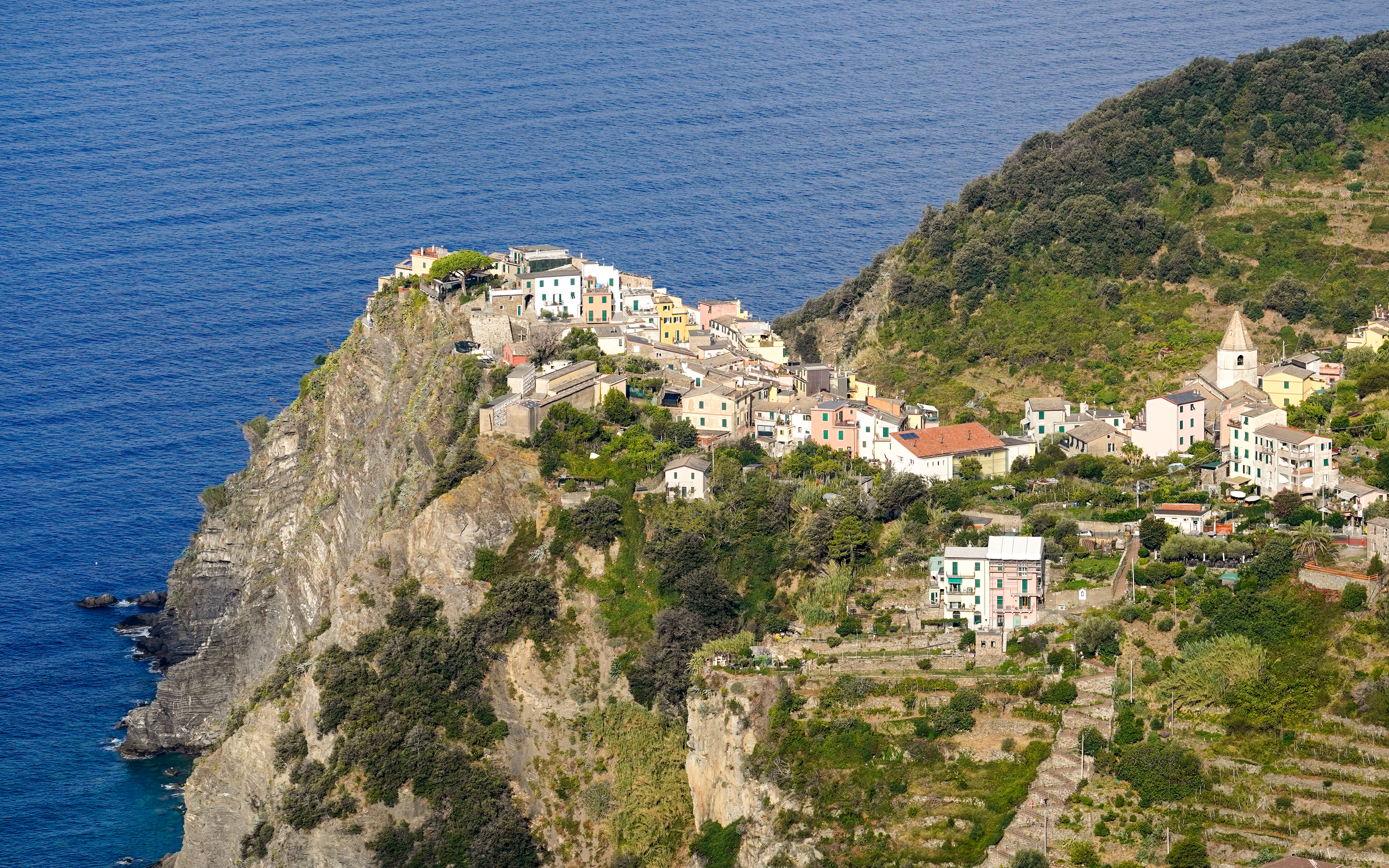
- View of Corniglia from the sky

- Location of Corniglia in Italy
- Coordinates: 44°07′11″N 9°42′31″E
- Country: Italy
- Region: Liguria
- Province: La Spezia (SP)
- Comune: Vernazza

Area
  - Total: 2 km^{2} (0.77 sq mi)
- Elevation: 105 m (344 ft)
- Demonym: Cornigliesi
- Time zone: UTC+1 (CET)
  - Summer (DST): UTC+2 (CEST)
- Postal code: 19010
- Dialing code: 0187
- Patron saint: Saint Peter
- Saint day: 29 June

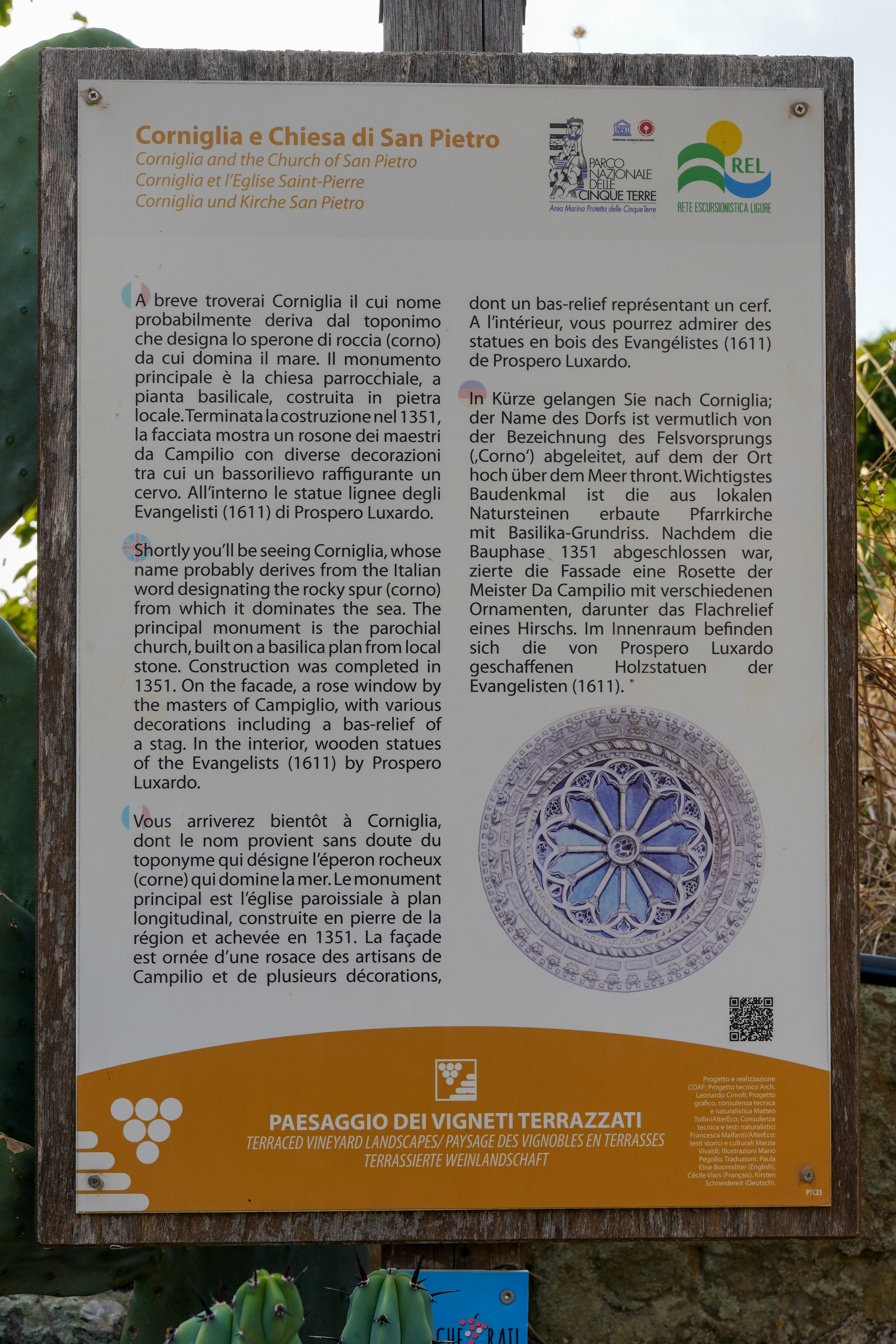
Information about Corniglia and San Pietro

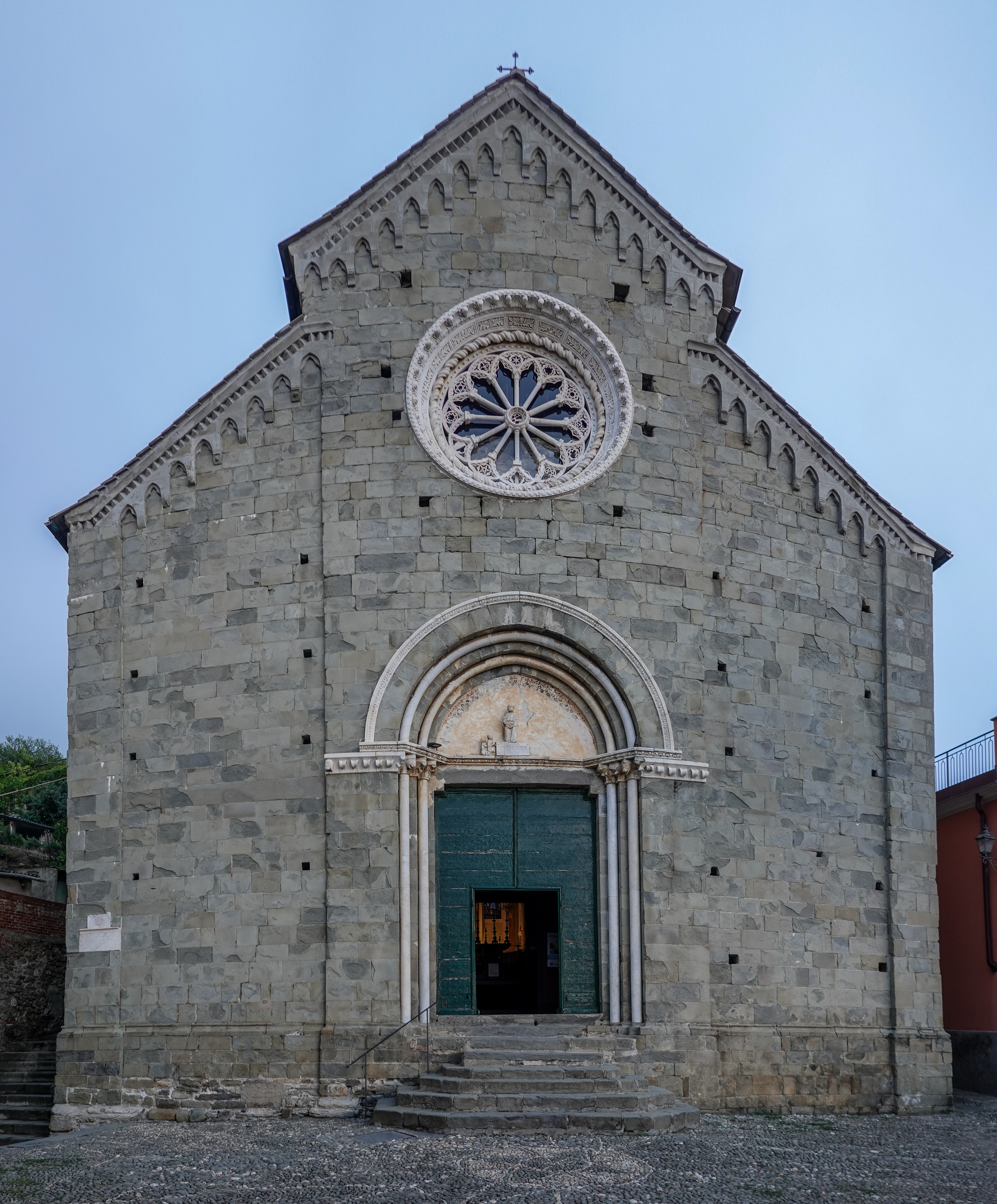
Church of San Pietro

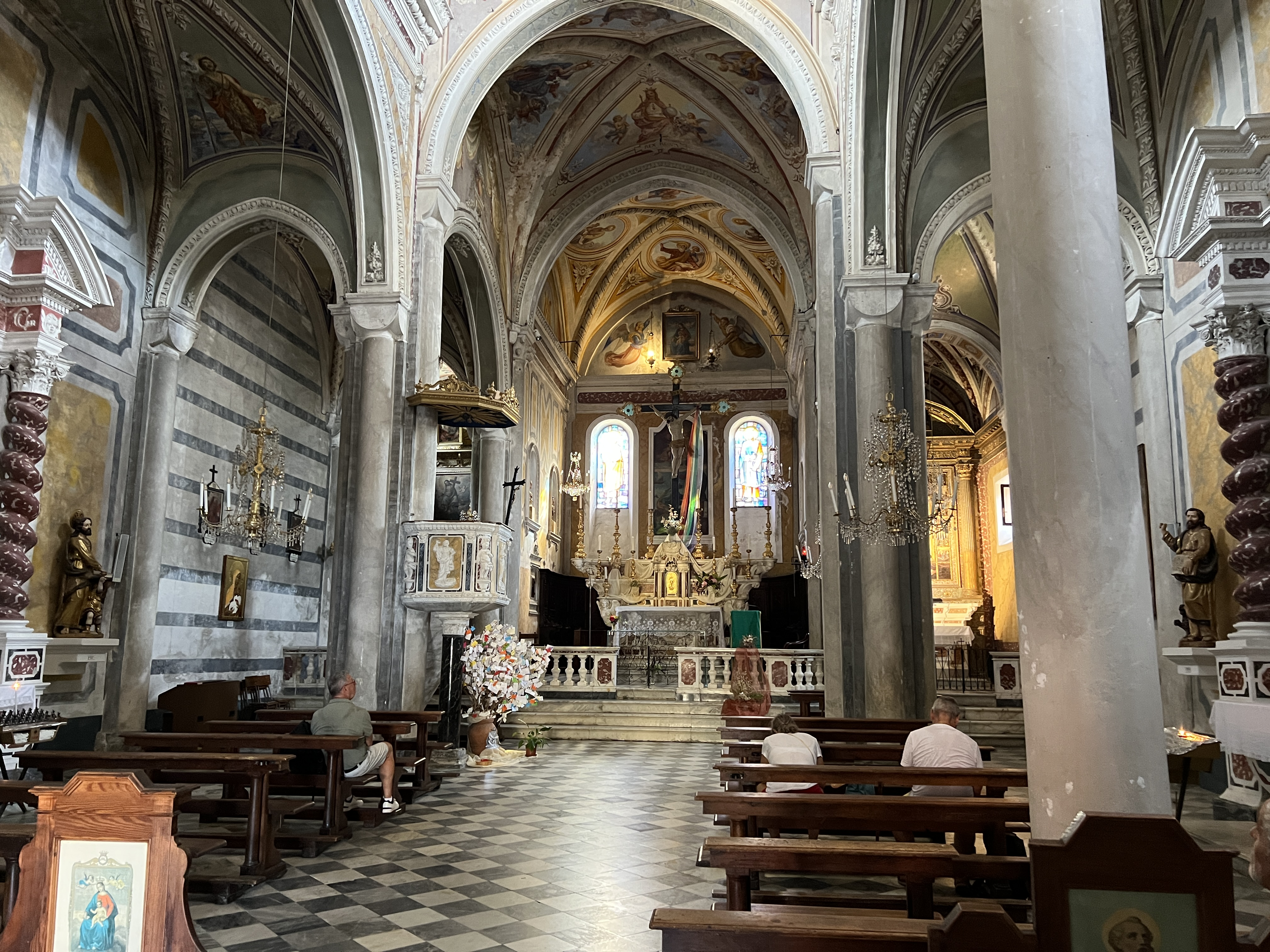
Naves in the interior

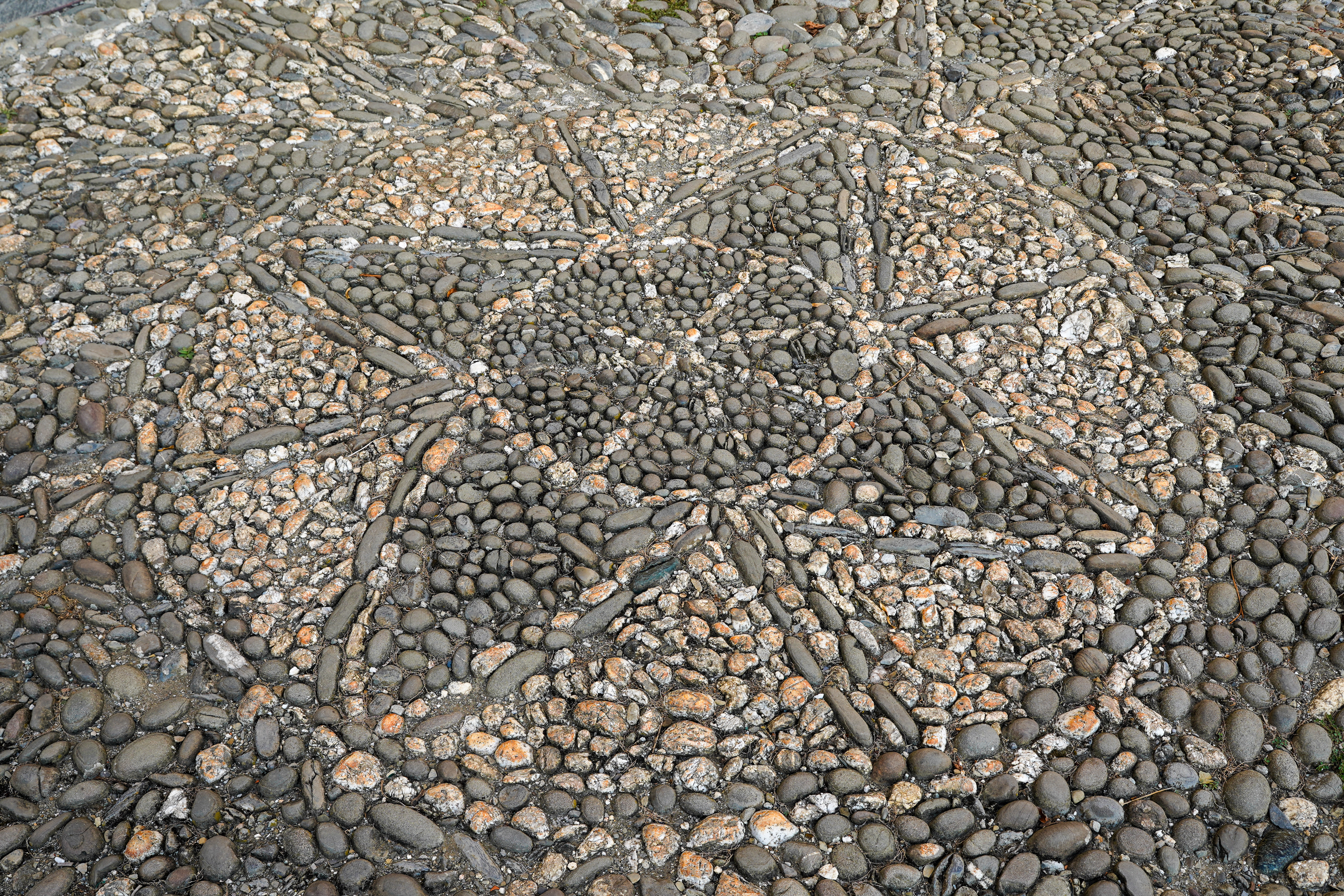
Polychrome cobblestones at entrance of San Pietro

Corniglia (Ligurian: Corniggia; locally Curnigia) is a frazione ("hamlet") within the comune of Vernazza in the province of La Spezia, Liguria, northern Italy, with a population of about 150 (in 2016). Unlike the other localities of the Cinque Terre, Corniglia is not directly adjacent to the sea. Instead, it is on the top of a promontory about 100 metres high, surrounded on three sides by vineyards and terraces, the fourth side descends steeply to the sea. To reach Corniglia, it is necessary to climb the Lardarina, a long brick flight of steps composed of 33 flights with 383 steps or, otherwise follow a vehicular road that, from the station, leads to the village. Sometimes a small bus runs.

The village stretches along the main road, Fieschi Road, and the houses have one side facing this road and the other facing the sea. Corniglia is characterised by narrow roads. There is a terrace in the rock from which all other four Cinque Terre villages can be seen, two on one side and two on the other. The town planning structure presents original characteristics compared to those of the other villages: the houses are lower set, and only more recently higher, similar to those of the villages of the hinterland.

Corniglia is mentioned in a famous novella of Giovanni Boccaccio's Decameron and in the novel The Invisible Circus by Jennifer Egan.

== History ==
The origin of the village dates back to the Roman Age as testified by the name, which finds its roots in Gens Cornelia, the Roman family to whom the land belonged. In the Middle Ages it was a possession of the counts of Lavagna, the lords of Carpena and of Luni. In 1254 Pope Innocent IV gave it to Nicolò Fieschi, who held it until 1276, when the village was acquired by the Republic of Genoa.

== Main sights ==
Documents dating from 1276 to 1277 mention the existence of a castle. However, remains of the castle have yet to be discovered and the location of the castle grounds is unknown. The only ruins in Corniglia belong to Genoese fortifications, a stronghold on a cliff plunging into the sea, which dates back to approximately 1556.

The parish church, Chiesa San Pietro, was built between 1334-1351 using local stone. The interior has three naves in the Baroque style. The baptismal font dates from the 12th century. In 2016, a 17th-century painting by the Corniglia painter Prospero Luxardi was installed next to the altar. This large oil painting on canvas depicts the mysteries of the Rosary and the Judgment. The rose window is made of white Carrara marble. The courtyard is paved with polychrome cobblestones.

== Popular culture ==
The 2021 animated film Luca was inspired by the Cinque Terre towns. While the fictional Portorosso town in the film is set on a coast, the Pixar animation team was particular interested in Corniglia for its more remote and less tourist heavy nature. The word “CORNIGLIA” in a stylish font is even shown on the map that the two fishermen (Giacomo and Tommaso) have on the boat in the opening scene of the movie, ESE of the fictional town (yet more inland since the label is shown on land, not along the coast as it is for “PORTOROSSO” in the same font) and NNE of the fictional Isola del Mare (“Island of the Sea”) where Alberto Scorfano lives. The location shown is approximately correct.

== Gallery ==
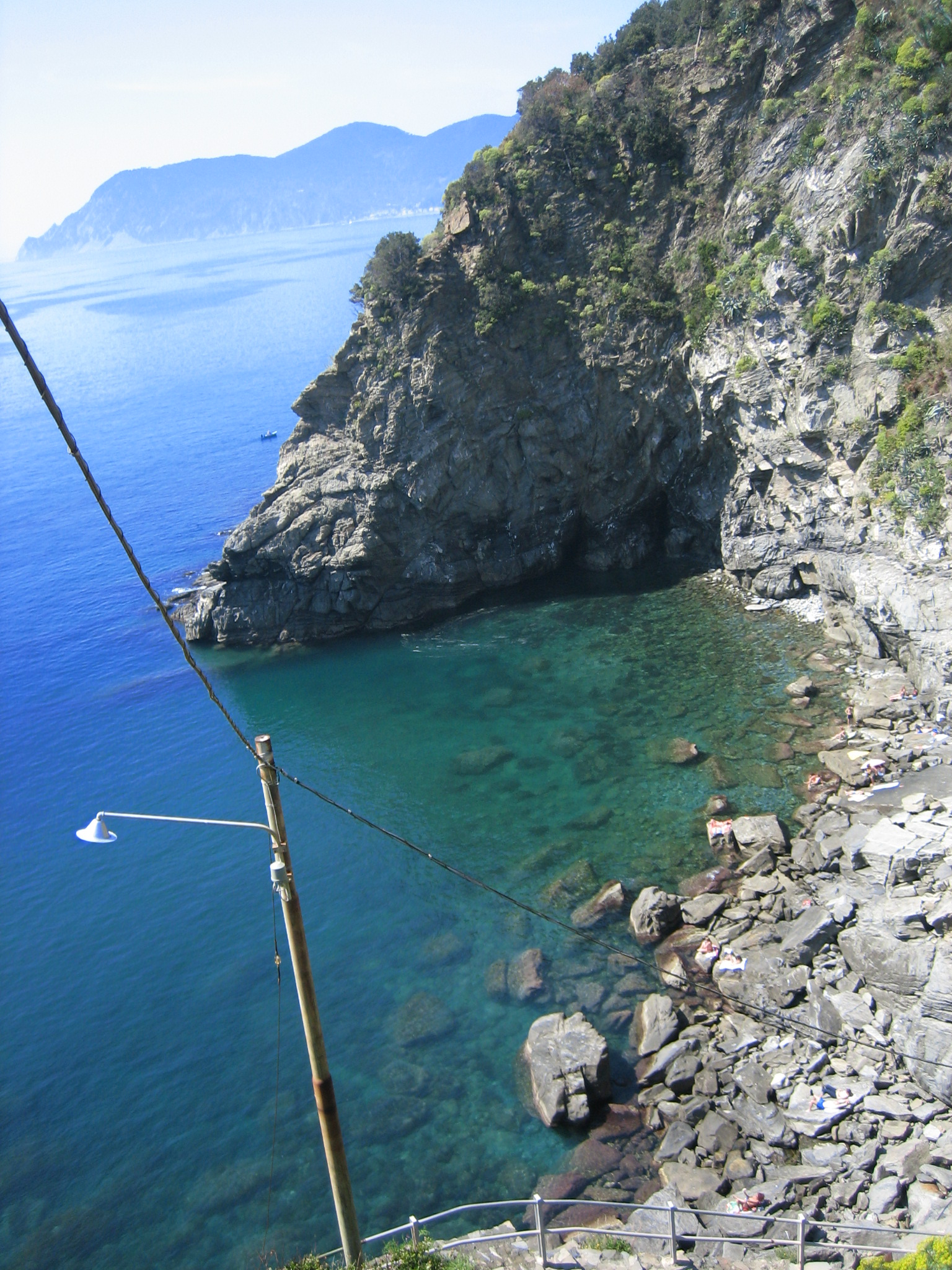
Corniglia's Marina

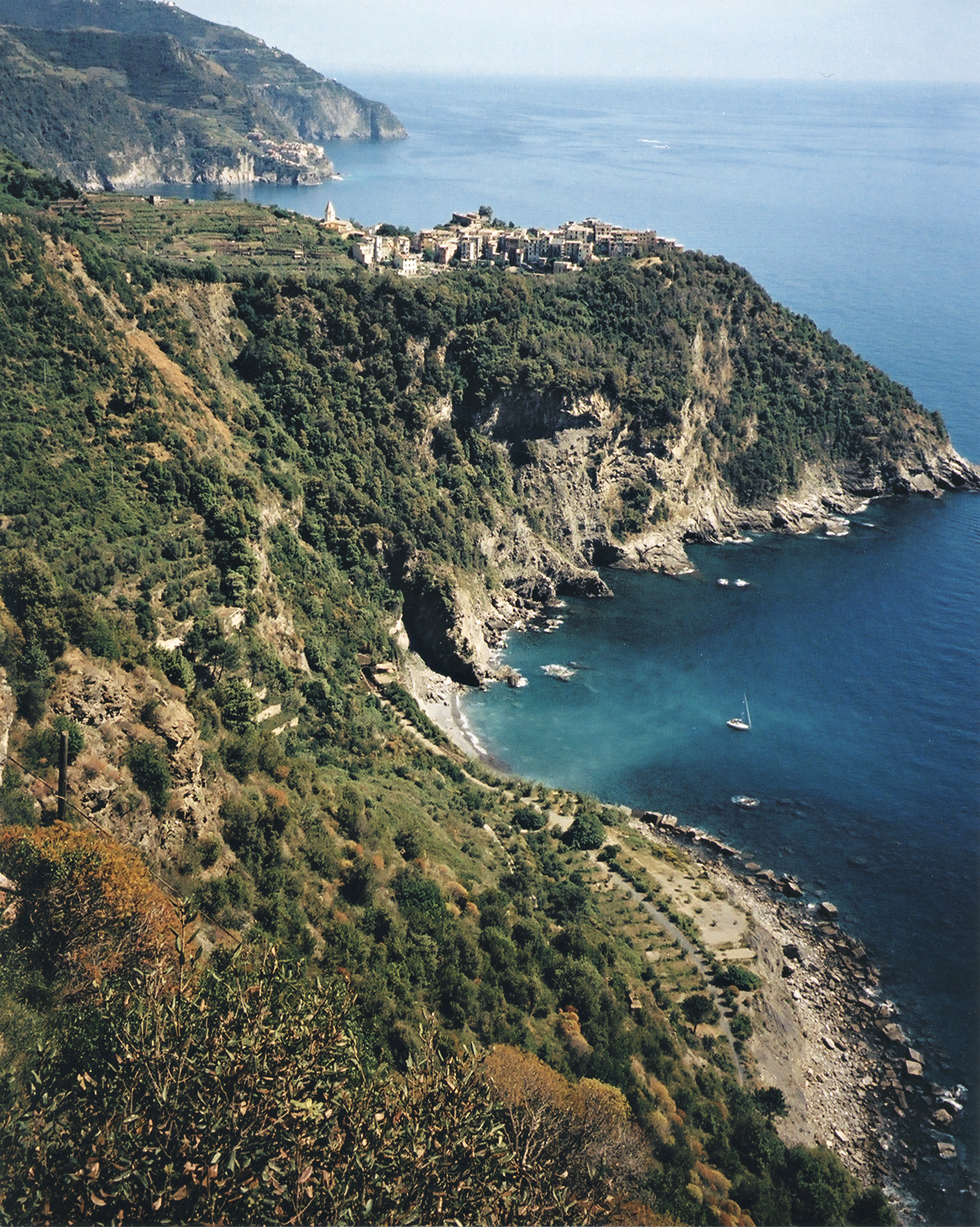
View from the northwest

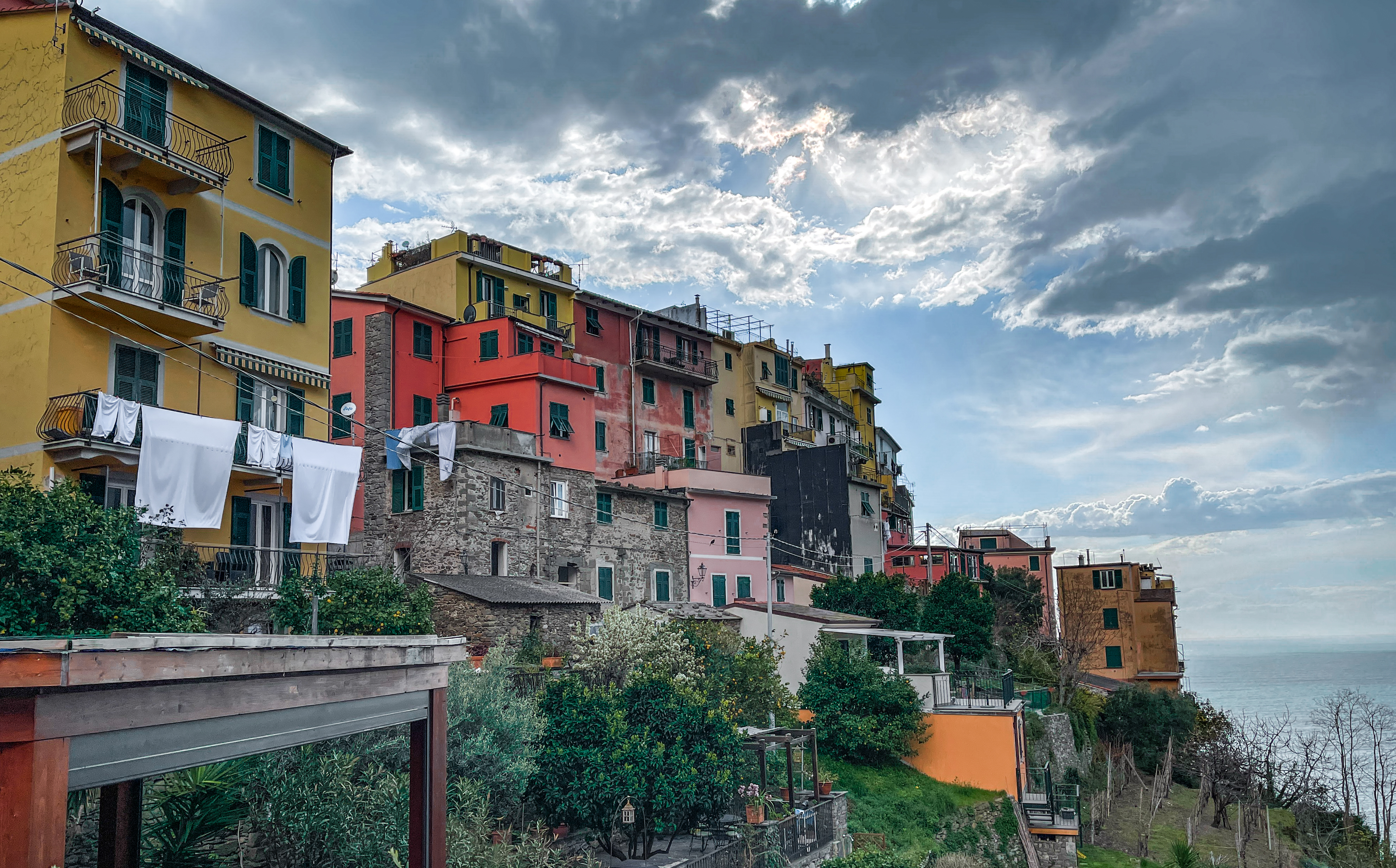
View of Corniglia

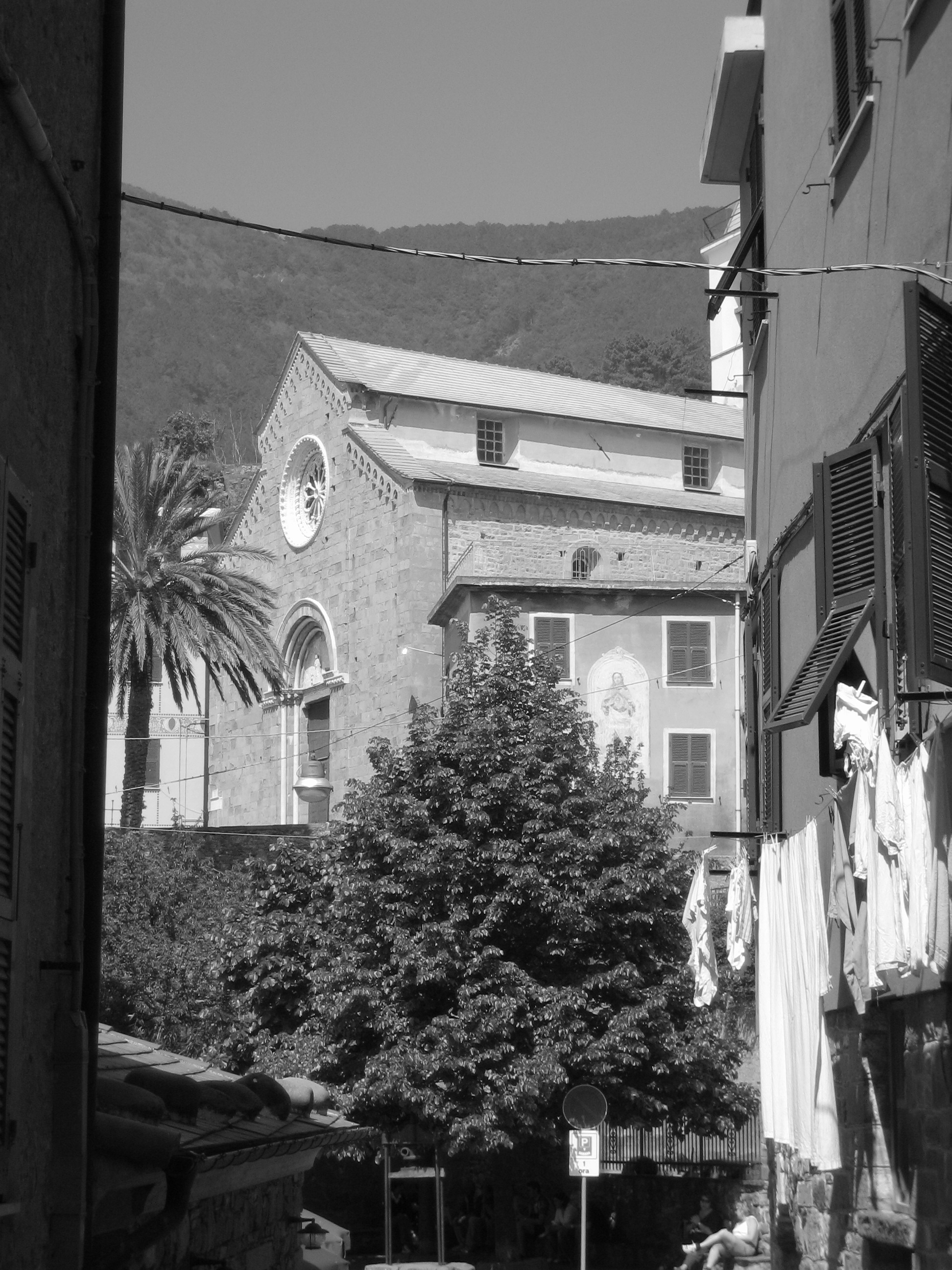
Church of S.Pietro from the carrugio

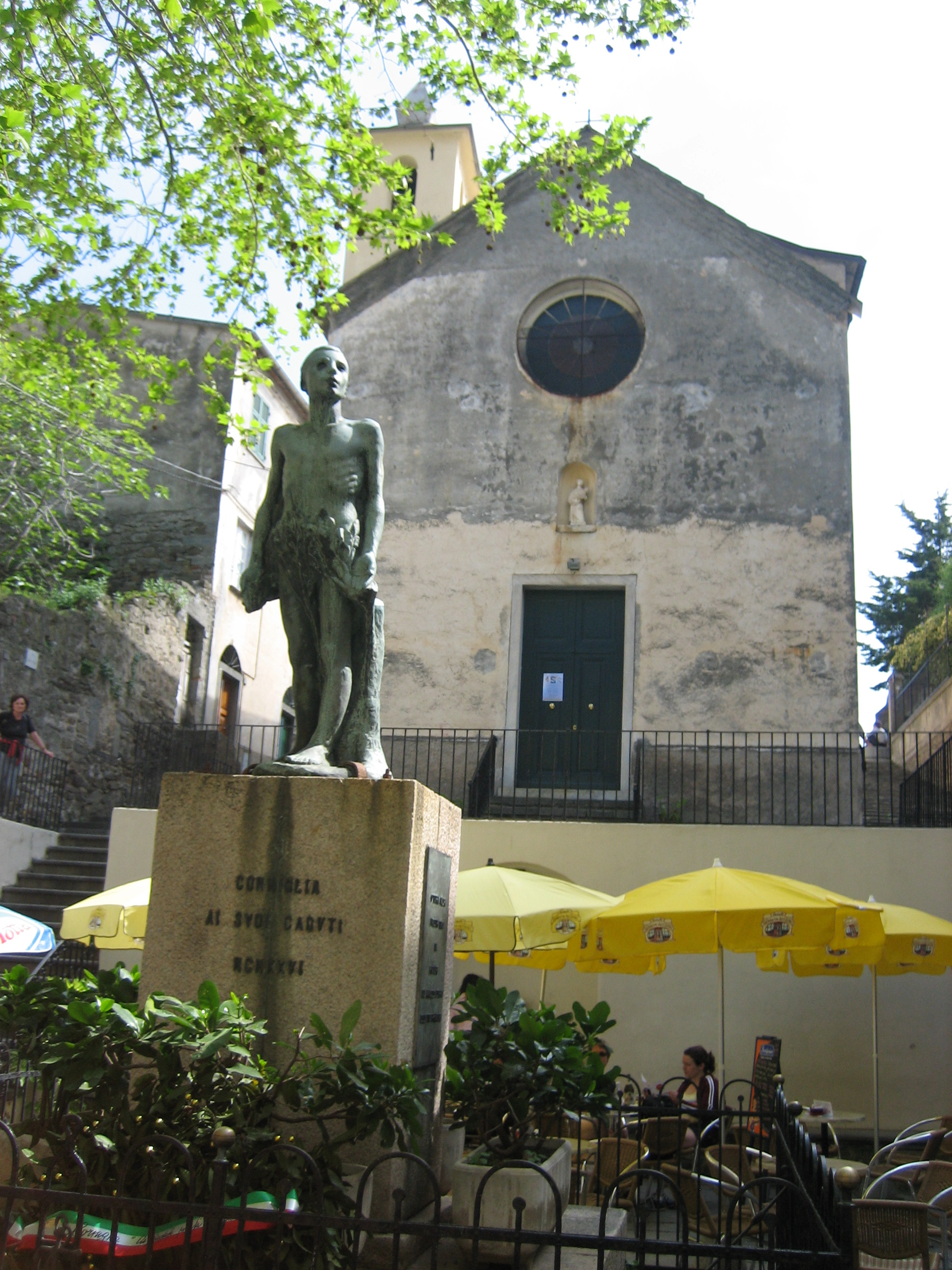
The oratory of S.Caterina over Largo Taragio

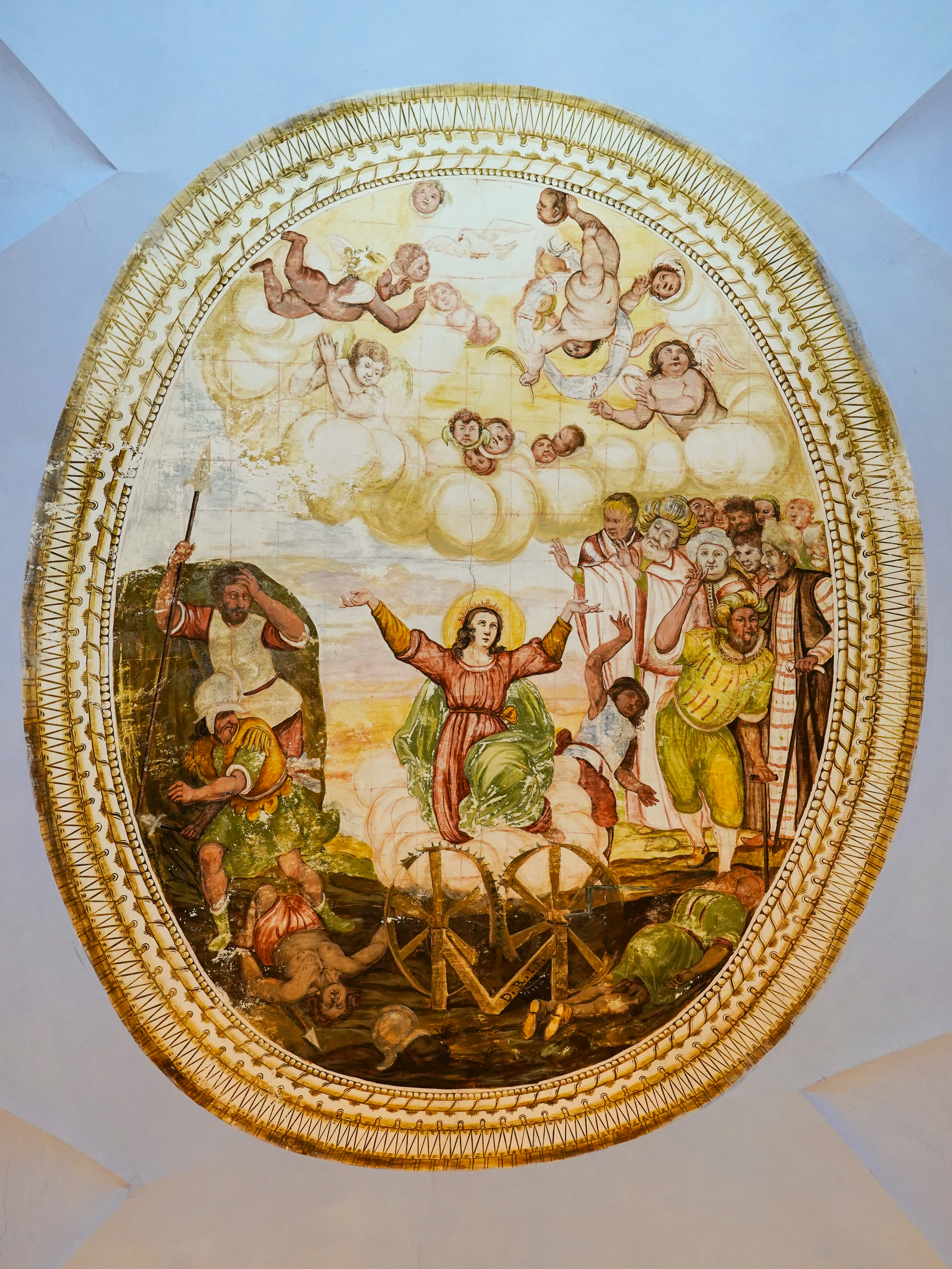
Fresco in the Oratory

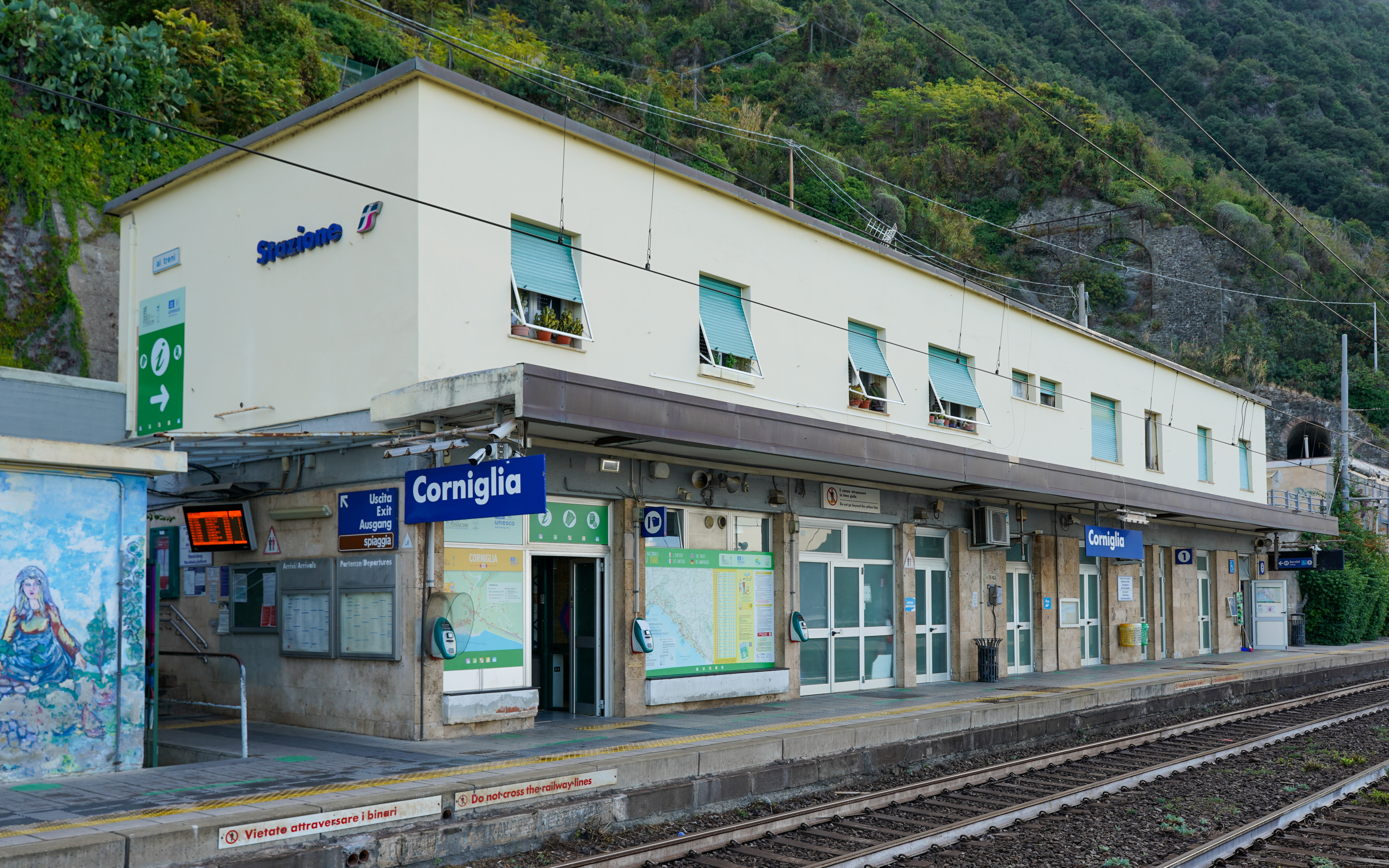
Railway station building
