= Pignone =

- Comune
- Comune di Pignone
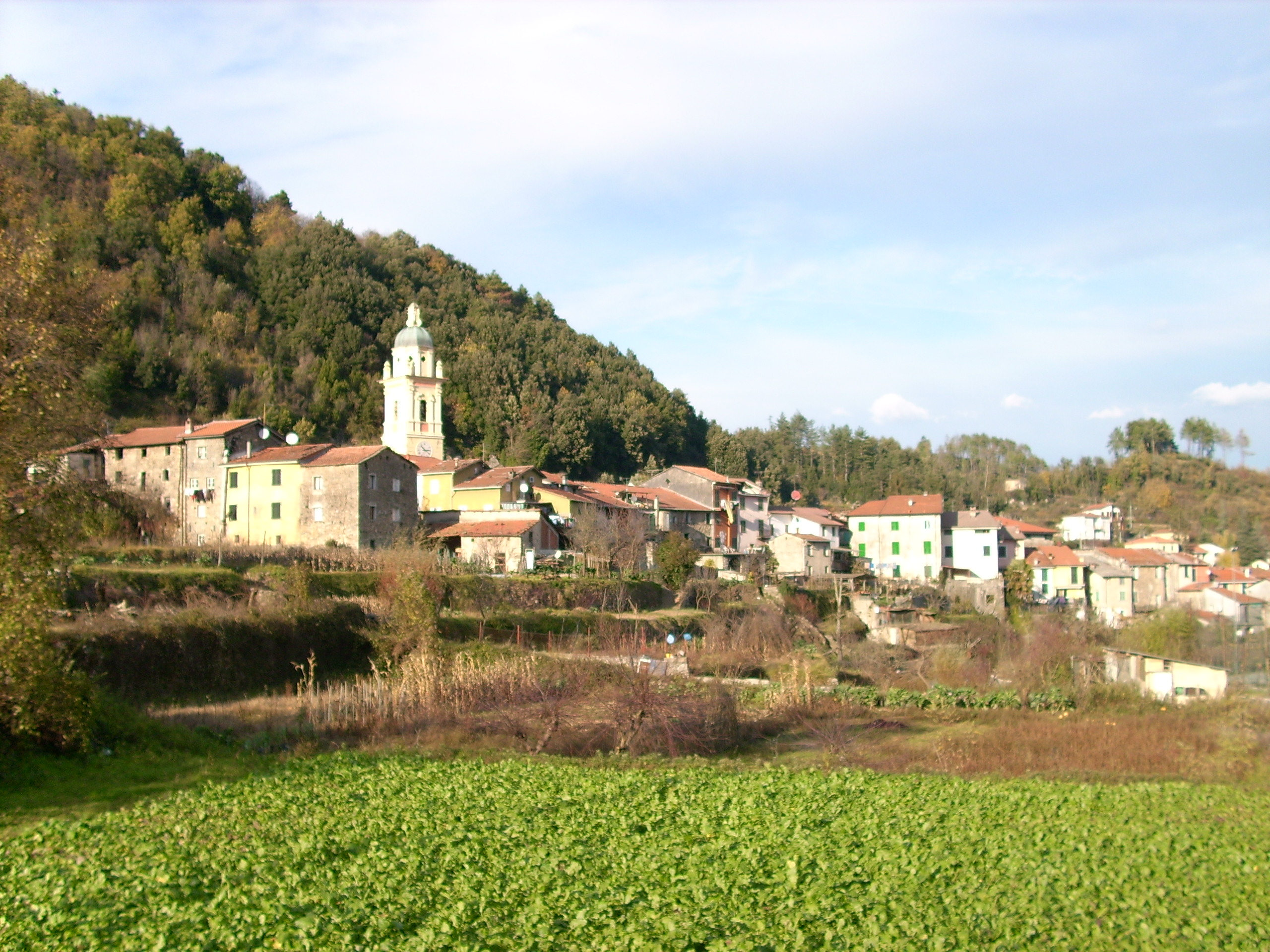
- Pignone

- Location within Italy Location within Liguria
- Coordinates: 44°11′N 9°44′E
- Country: Italy
- Region: Liguria
- Province: Province of La Spezia (SP)
- Frazioni: Casale

Area
  - Total: 16.2 km^{2} (6.3 sq mi)

Population (Dec. 2004)
  - Total: 654
  - Density: 40.4/km^{2} (105/sq mi)
- Time zone: UTC+1 (CET)
  - Summer (DST): UTC+2 (CEST)
- Postal code: 19020
- Dialing code: 0187

Pignone (Ligurian: Pignon; locally Pignun) is a comune (municipality) in the Province of La Spezia in the Italian region Liguria, located about 70 kilometres (43 mi) southeast of Genoa and about 11 kilometres (7 mi) northwest of La Spezia. As of 31 December 2004, it had a population of 654 and an area of 16.2 square kilometres (6.3 mi^{2}).

The municipality of Pignone contains the frazione (subdivision) Casale.

Pignone borders the following municipalities: Beverino, Borghetto di Vara, Levanto, Monterosso al Mare, Vernazza.

== Demographic evolution ==
Historical population

| Year | Pop. | ±% |
|---|---|---|
| 1861 | 1,283 | — |
| 1871 | 1,380 | +7.6% |
| 1881 | 1,360 | −1.4% |
| 1901 | 1,080 | −20.6% |
| 1911 | 1,031 | −4.5% |

| Year | Pop. | ±% |
|---|---|---|
| 1921 | 1,085 | +5.2% |
| 1931 | 1,024 | −5.6% |
| 1936 | 1,081 | +5.6% |
| 1951 | 987 | −8.7% |
| 1961 | 879 | −10.9% |

| Year | Pop. | ±% |
|---|---|---|
| 1971 | 798 | −9.2% |
| 1981 | 728 | −8.8% |
| 1991 | 714 | −1.9% |
| 2001 | 650 | −9.0% |

Source: Data from ISTAT
