= Vara (river) =

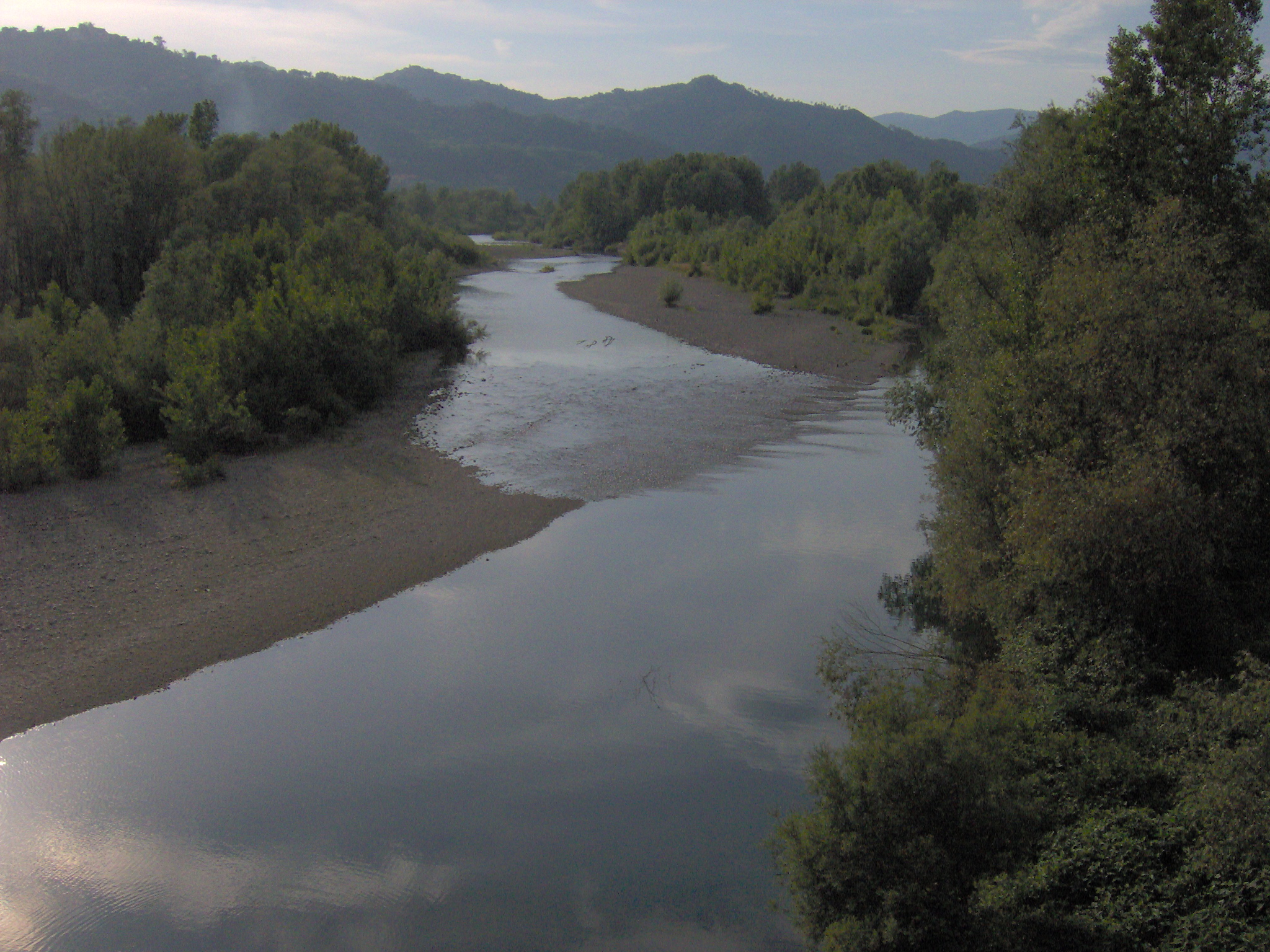
- The river at the bridge of Ceparana, Bolano

Location
- Country: Italy

Physical characteristics
- Source
  - location: Monte Zatta
  - elevation: 1,404 m (4,606 ft)
- Mouth: Magra
  - location: Santo Stefano di Magra
  - coordinates: 44.1489°N 9.8912°E
- Length: 58 km (36 mi)
- Discharge
  - average: 16 m^{3}/s (570 cu ft/s)

Basin features
- Progression: Magra→ Tyrrhenian Sea

The Vara is a river of the Province of La Spezia in Liguria, north-western Italy.

== Geography ==
The river runs through Varese Ligure, Brugnato, Borghetto di Vara and Castiglione di Vara. At 58 kilometres (36 mi) it is the longest river in Liguria. The main source of the river is on Monte Zatta; for much of its course it flows in a southeasterly direction, parallel to the Riviera di levante, in the valley which takes its name: the Val di Vara. The river flows into the Magra, as a right tributary, at Fornola within the commune of Santo Stefano di Magra.

== History ==
The Département du Vara or Dipartimento del Vara of Ligurian Republic took its name at the end of the 18th century from the river.
