= Santo Stefano di Magra =

- Comune
- Comune di Santo Stefano di Magra
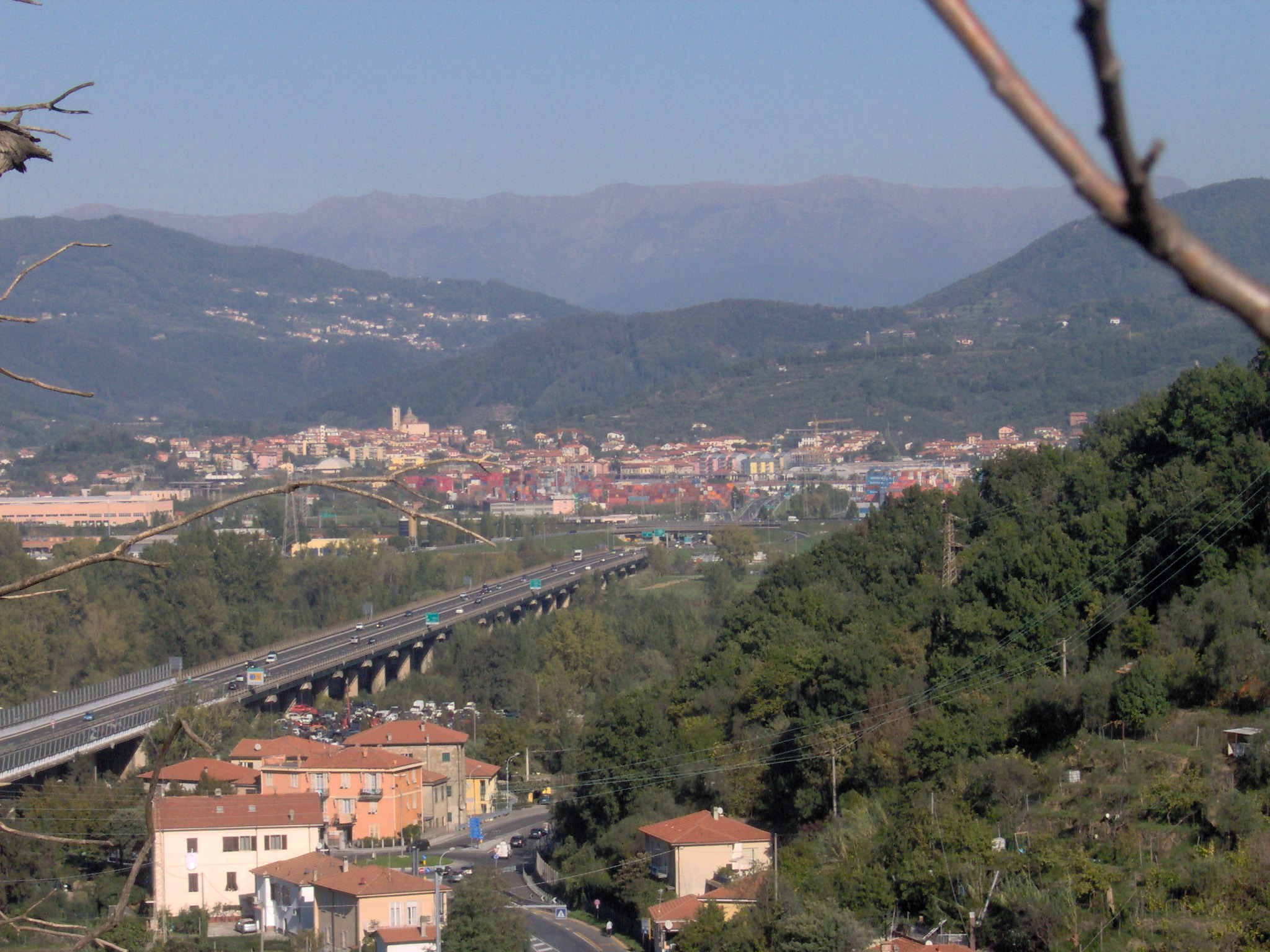

- Coat of arms

- Location within Italy Location within Liguria
- Coordinates: 44°10′N 9°55′E
- Country: Italy
- Region: Liguria
- Province: La Spezia (SP)
- Frazioni: Ponzano Magra, Ponzano Belaso, Ponzano Superiore

Government
  - Mayor: Juri Mazzanti

Area
  - Total: 14.0 km^{2} (5.4 sq mi)

Population (31 May 2007)
  - Total: 8,463
  - Density: 604/km^{2} (1,570/sq mi)
- Demonym: Santostefanesi
- Time zone: UTC+1 (CET)
  - Summer (DST): UTC+2 (CEST)
- Postal code: 19037
- Dialing code: 0187
- Patron saint: St. Stephen Protomartyr
- Saint day: August 3

Santo Stefano di Magra (Ligurian: San Steva, Lunigiano Emilian: Sa' Steu) is a comune (municipality) in the Province of La Spezia in the Italian region Liguria, located about 80 kilometres (50 mi) southeast of Genoa and about 11 kilometres (7 mi) northeast of La Spezia. It is located near the confluence of torrent Vara into the Magra river. It is part of the Montemarcello-Magra Natural Regional Park. It has an entrance and exit to the toll-paying "Autostrada"

The municipality of Santo Stefano di Magra contains the frazioni (subdivisions, mainly villages and hamlets) Ponzano Magra, Ponzano Belaso, and Ponzano Superiore.

Santo Stefano di Magra borders the following municipalities: Aulla, Bolano, Sarzana, Vezzano Ligure.

== History ==
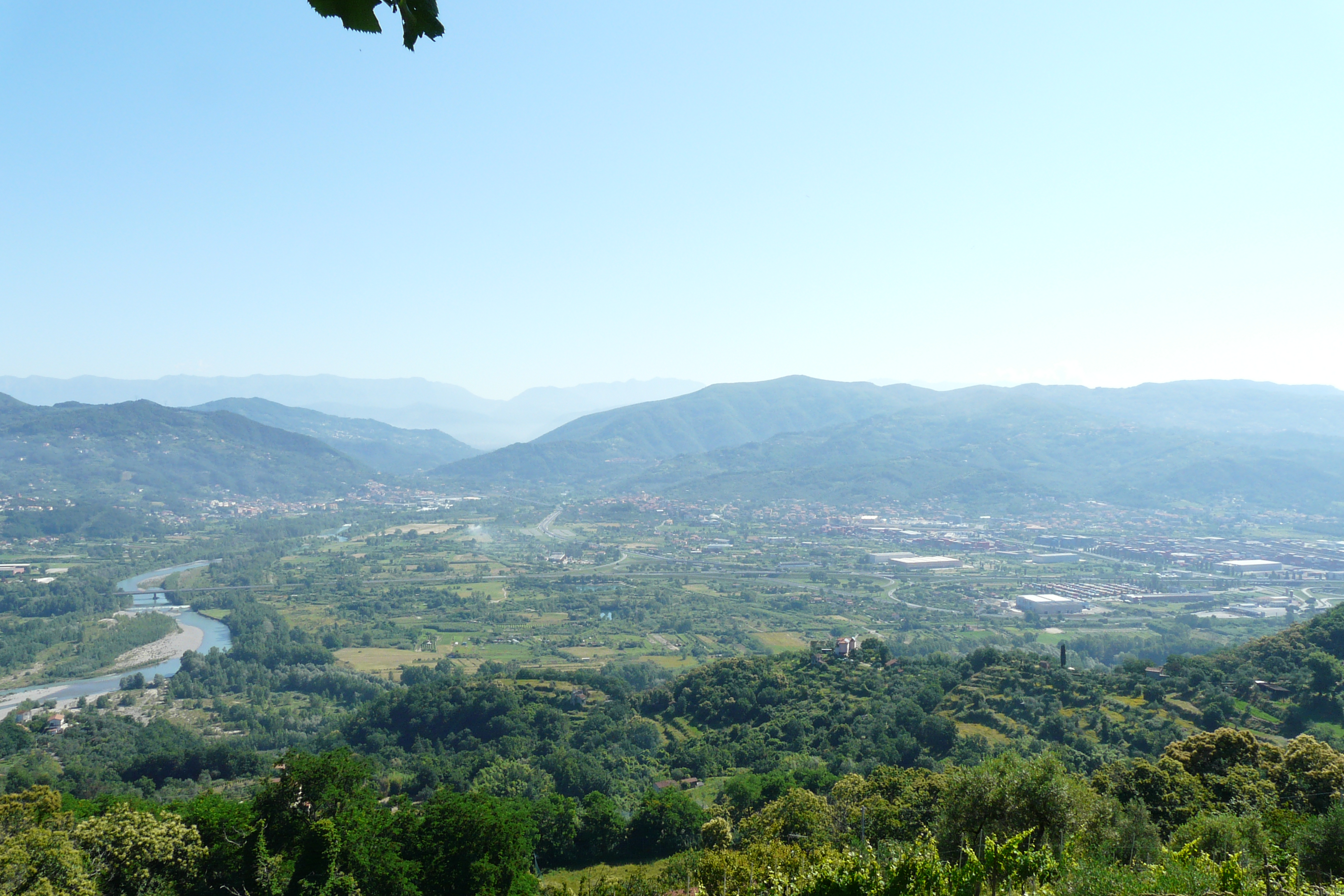
Landscape around Santo Stefano di Magra and Ponzano with agriculture in Piana di Ceparana and Magra river upstream

Founded before 1000 AD, Santo Stefano is remembered as a marketplace in 981 by Emperor Otto II and in 1185 by Emperor Frederick I. It was a stage across the Via Francigena, with a hospice housing pilgrims and travellers.

Around 1200 it is first mentioned on a written source, in the event of the peace between the Malaspina family and the bishops of Luni.

== Main sights ==
The town is divided into two parts by the old central road, and enclosed by powerful late Renaissance walls. The church dedicated to St. Stephen was built in the 18th century over a medieval pieve.

== Demographic evolution ==
Historical population

Year	Pop.	±%
1861	1,963	—
1871	2,116	+7.8%
1881	2,112	−0.2%
1901	2,706	+28.1%
1911	3,081	+13.9%

Year	Pop.	±%
1921	3,677	+19.3%
1931	4,155	+13.0%
1936	4,402	+5.9%
1951	5,211	+18.4%
1961	5,908	+13.4%

Year	Pop.	±%
1971	6,117	+3.5%
1981	6,984	+14.2%
1991	7,884	+12.9%
2001	8,344	+5.8%

Source: Data from ISTAT
