= Magra =

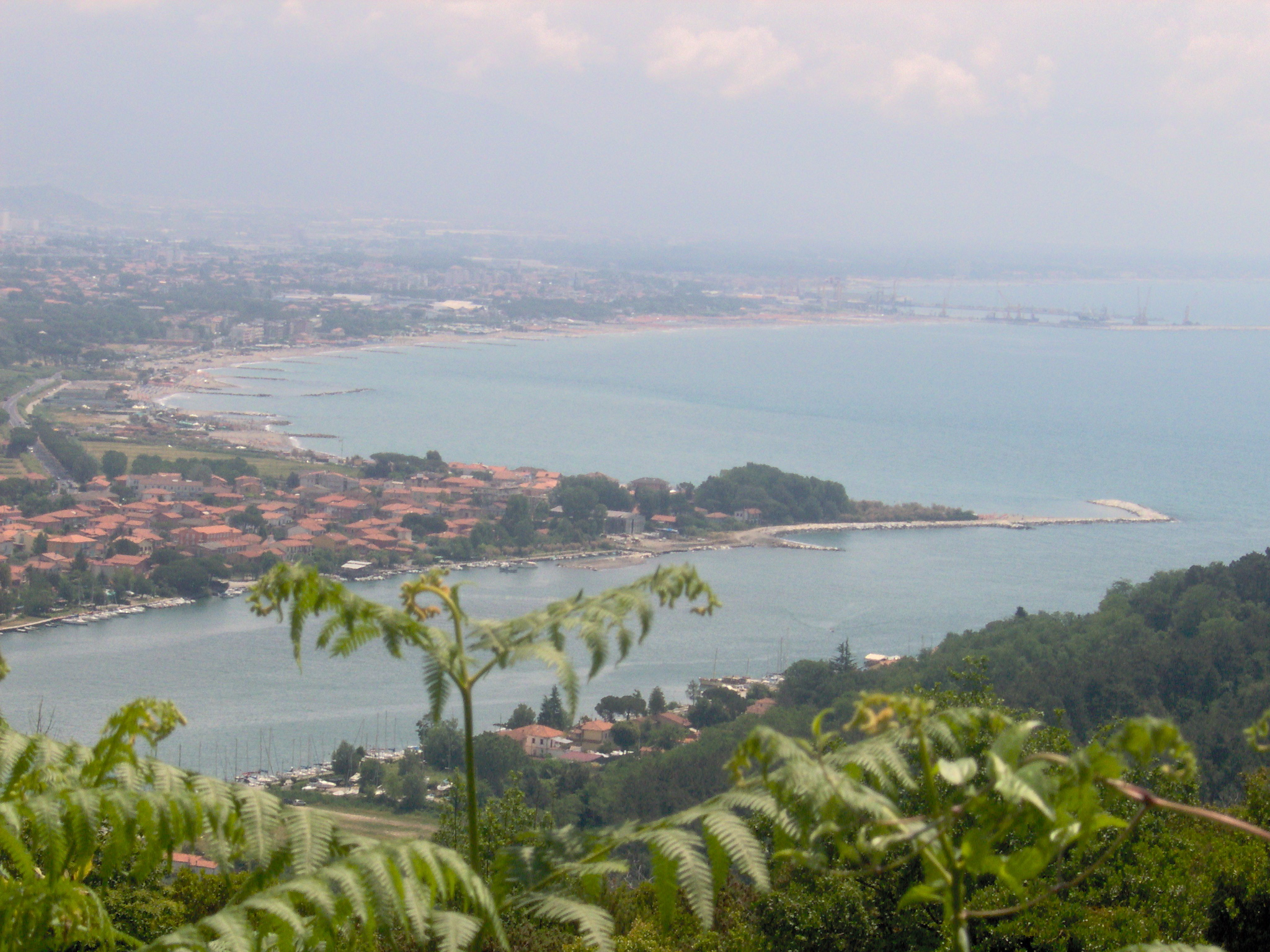
- The mouth of the Magra

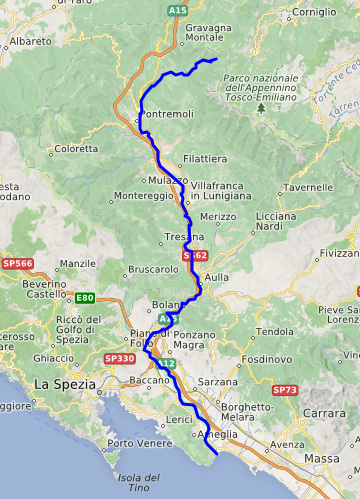

Location
- Country: Italy

Physical characteristics
- Source
  - location: Between Monte Borgognone and Monte Tavola
  - elevation: 1,200 m (3,900 ft)
- Mouth: Tyrrhenian Sea
  - coordinates: 44.0481°N 9.9876°E
  - elevation: 0 m (0 ft)
- Length: 62 km (39 mi)
- Basin size: 1,686 km^{2} (651 mi^{2})
- Discharge
  - average: 40 m^{3}/s (1,400 cu ft/s)

The Magra is a 62-kilometre (39 mi) long river of Northern Italy, which runs through Pontremoli, Filattiera, Villafranca in Lunigiana and Aulla in the province of Massa-Carrara (Tuscany); Santo Stefano di Magra, Vezzano Ligure, Arcola, Sarzana and Ameglia in the province of La Spezia (Liguria).

In Roman times, it was known as the Macra and marked the eastern boundary of the territory of Liguria.

The river's drainage basin occupies around 1,700 km^{2} (660 mi^{2}). Its most important tributary is the Vara which joins the Magra from the right within the commune of Santo Stefano di Magra.

== Caprigliola bridge collapse ==
In April 2020 a 260-metre long (850 ft) road bridge across the Magra at Albiano Magra near Aulla collapsed. Very few vehicles were using the bridge at the time due to the coronavirus lockdown then in force, and only two people were injured.

== Regional Natural Park of Montemarcello-Magra-Vara ==
Since 1995 an area of 4,320.8 hectares (10,677 acres) surrounding the Magra and Vara rivers is protected by a natural park of the regione Liguria, placed near the border with the Tuscany region. Due its biodiversity, the Regional Natural Park of Montemarcello-Magra-Vara is part of the Natura 2000 European network.

== See also ==
- List of rivers of Italy
