= Borghetto di Vara =

Borghetto di Vara O Borghetto de Væa
- Comune
- Comune di Borghetto di Vara
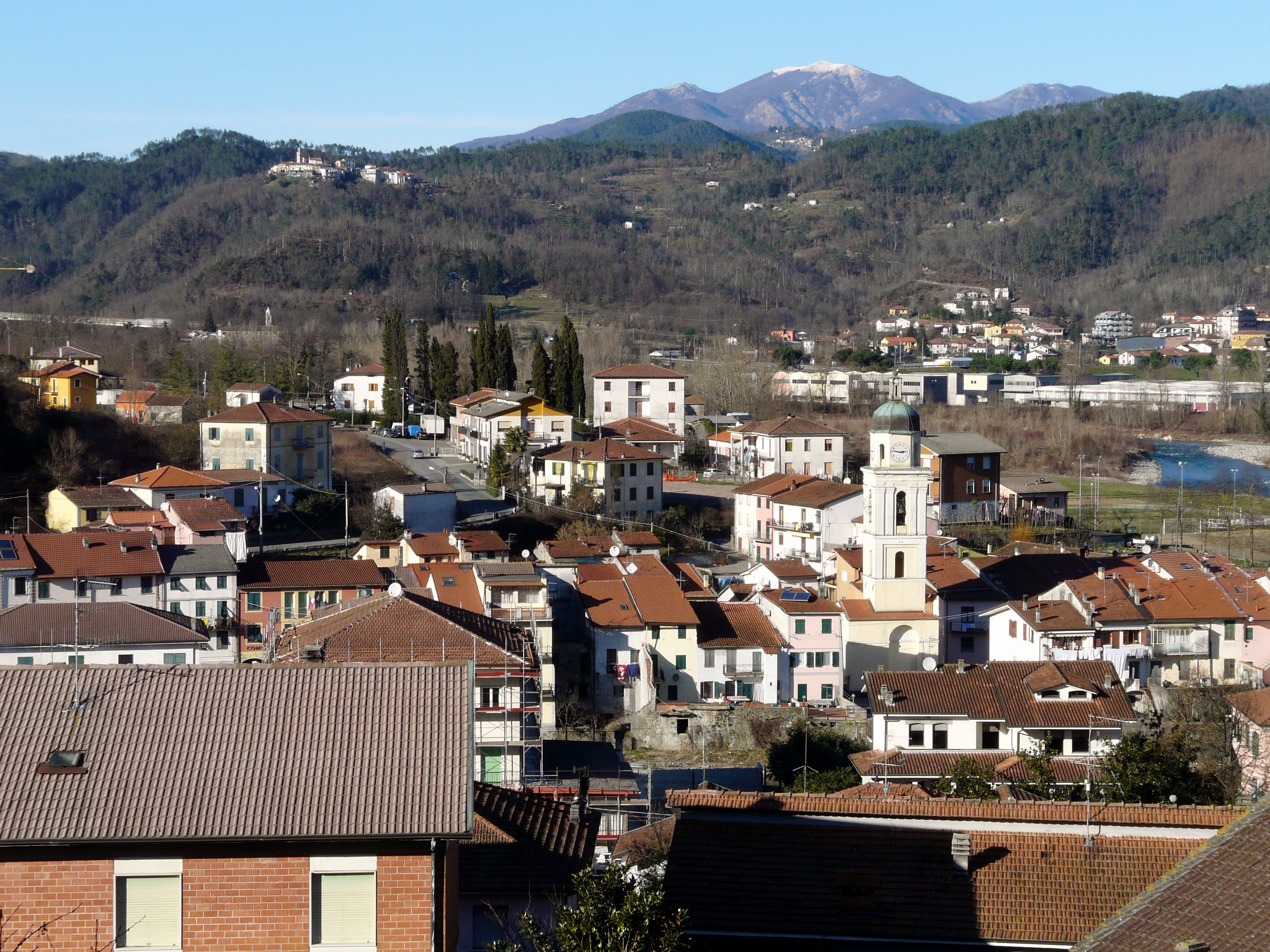
- Borghetto di Vara

- Coat of arms

- Location within Italy Location within Liguria
- Coordinates: 44°13′N 9°43′E
- Country: Italy
- Region: Liguria
- Province: Province of La Spezia (SP)
- Frazioni: Boccapignone, Cassana, L'Ago, Pogliasca, Ripalta, Termine di Roverano

Government
  - Mayor: Claudia Delvigo

Area
  - Total: 27.3 km^{2} (10.5 sq mi)
- Elevation: 104 m (341 ft)

Population (31 December 2015)
  - Total: 937
  - Density: 34.3/km^{2} (88.9/sq mi)
- Demonym: Borghettini
- Time zone: UTC+1 (CET)
  - Summer (DST): UTC+2 (CEST)
- Postal code: 19020
- Dialing code: 0187

Borghetto di Vara (Ligurian: O Borghetto de Væa, locally U Burghetu) is a comune (municipality) in the Province of La Spezia in the Italian region Liguria, located about 70 kilometres (43 mi) southeast of Genoa and about 15 kilometres (9 mi) northwest of La Spezia.

Borghetto di Vara borders the following municipalities: Beverino, Brugnato, Carrodano, Levanto, Pignone, Rocchetta di Vara, Sesta Godano.

== Twin towns ==
Borghetto di Vara is twinned with:

- Schneckenlohe, Germany (1993)
