= Carpena =

Carpena, Cárpena or Carpeña is a Spanish-language surname of Italian origin. It is the hispanicised version of the Italian family name Carpegna, brought to Spain by Italian settlers, which is a habitational surname for people from the village of Carpegna in the Marche region. Notable people with the surname include:

- Claudia Cárpena (born 1957), Argentine actress
- Francisco Cárpena (1882–1955), Argentine actor
- Homero Cárpena (1910–2001), Argentine actor
- José María Martín Carpena (1950–2000), Spanish politician
- Maria Carpena (1886–1915), Filipina actress and singer
- Nora Cárpena (born 1945), Argentine actress
- Pepita Carpeña (1919–2005), Spanish anarchist

== See also ==
- Palacio de Deportes José María Martín Carpena, indoor sporting arena in Málaga, Spain
