= Province of La Spezia =

Province of Italy, located in the Liguria region

Coordinates: 44°06′28.95″N 09°49′43.94″E

Province of La Spezia Provincia della Spezia (Italian) Provinsa dea Spèza (Ligurian)
- Province
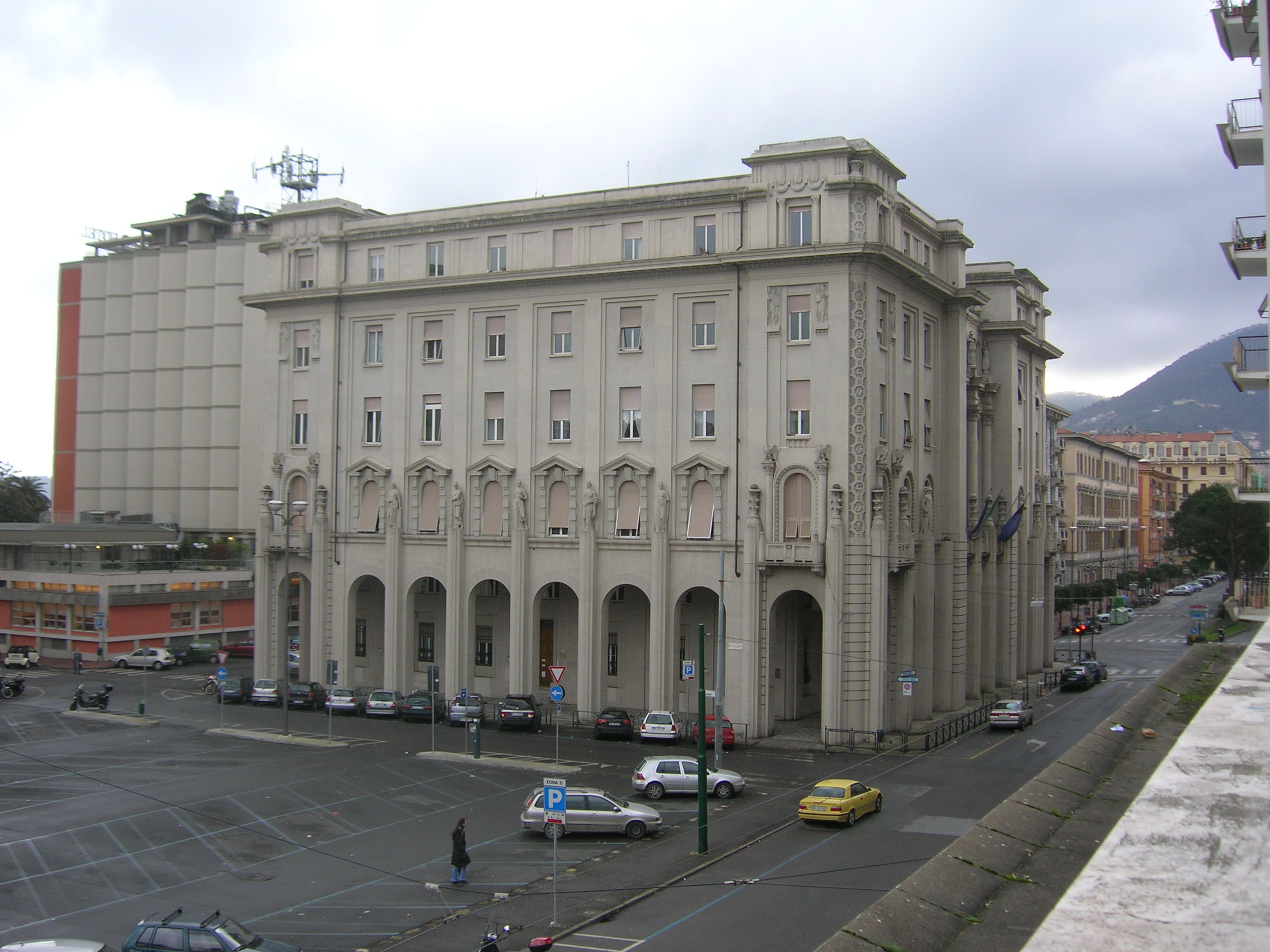
- The provincial seat building

- Flag Coat of arms

- Location of the province of La Spezia in Italy
- Country: Italy
- Region: Liguria
- Capital(s): La Spezia
- Municipalities: 32

Government
  - President: Pierluigi Peracchini

Area
  - Total: 881.35 km^{2} (340.29 sq mi)

Population (2026)
  - Total: 214,539
  - Density: 243.42/km^{2} (630.46/sq mi)

GDP
  - Total: €6.514 billion (2015)
  - Per capita: €29,431 (2015)
- Time zone: UTC+1 (CET)
  - Summer (DST): UTC+2 (CEST)
- Postal code: 19010-19018; 19020-19021; 19025; 19028; 19030-19032; 19034, 19038, 19100
- Telephone prefix: 0187
- Vehicle registration: SP
- ISTAT code: 011
- Website: Official website

The province of La Spezia (Italian: provincia della Spezia; Ligurian: provinsa dea Spèza) is a province in the region of Liguria in northern Italy. Its capital is the city of La Spezia.

It has a population of 214,539 in an area of 881.35 square kilometres (340.29 sq mi) across its 32 municipalities.

== Geography ==
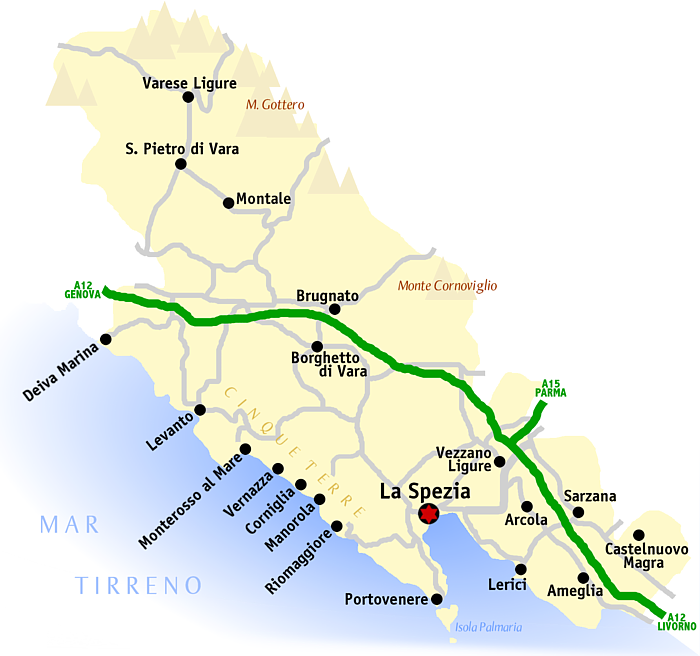
Map of the province of La Spezia

In the province of La Spezia are the Cinque Terre, Portovenere and the Islands (Palmaria, Tino and Tinetto), a UNESCO World Heritage Site. Also more in this area are the villages of Brugnato, Montemarcello, Tellaro and Varese Ligure, which were included in the list of the most beautiful villages in Italy. In addition, the province of La Spezia is one of the institutions awarded with the gold medal for Military Valour for the sacrifices of its people and its activities in the partisan struggle during the Second World War.

== Government ==
=== Municipalities ===
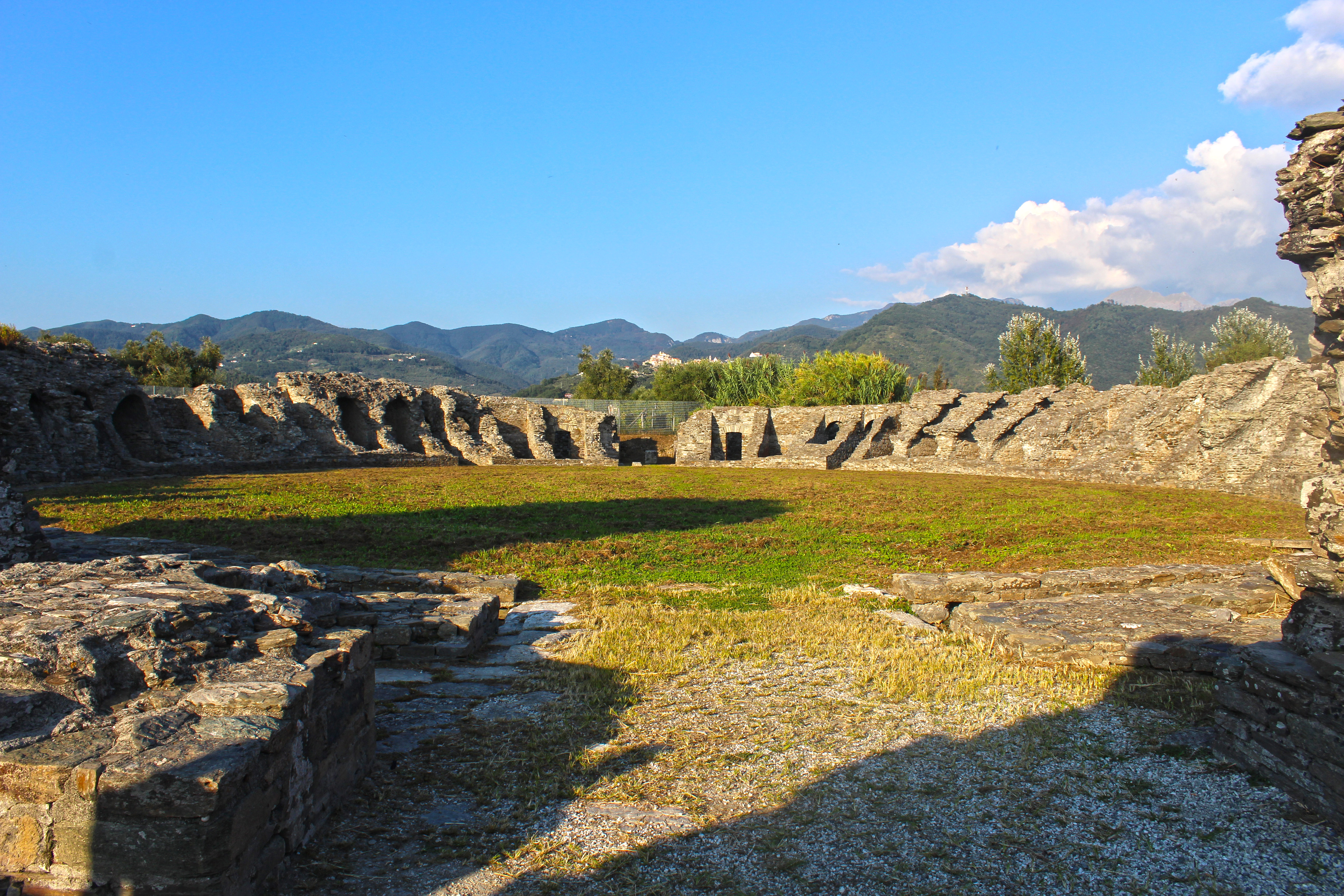
Roman amphitheater of Luni

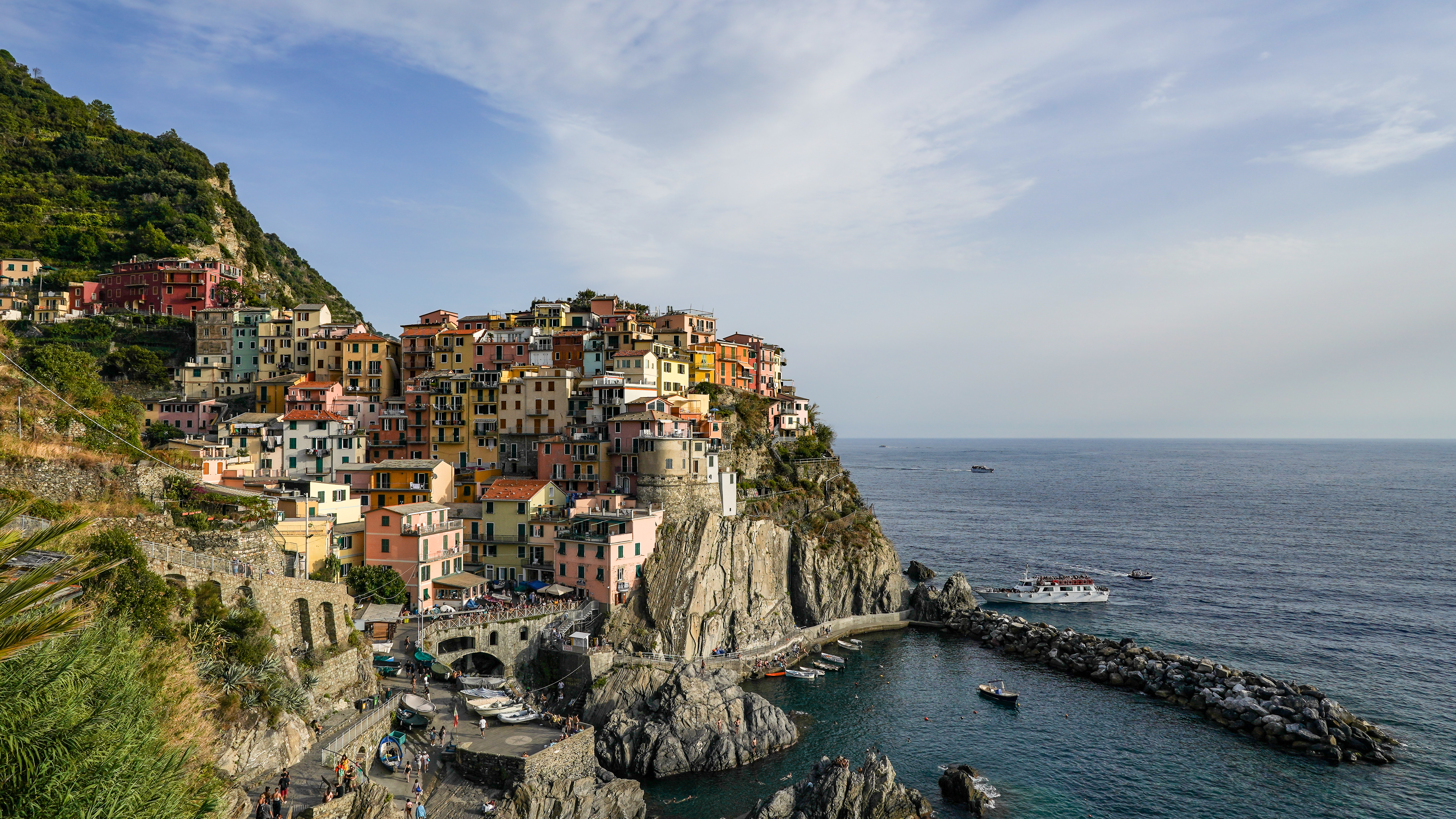
Manarola

The province has 32 municipalities:

- Ameglia
- Arcola
- Beverino
- Bolano
- Bonassola
- Borghetto di Vara
- Brugnato
- Calice al Cornoviglio
- Carro
- Carrodano
- Castelnuovo Magra
- Deiva Marina
- Follo
- Framura
- La Spezia
- Lerici
- Levanto
- Luni
- Maissana
- Monterosso al Mare
- Pignone
- Portovenere
- Riccò del Golfo di Spezia
- Riomaggiore
- Rocchetta di Vara
- Santo Stefano di Magra
- Sarzana
- Sesta Godano
- Varese Ligure
- Vernazza
- Vezzano Ligure
- Zignago

== Demographics ==
As of 2026, the population is 214,539, of which 49.1% are male, and 50.9% are female. Minors make up 13.0% of the population, and seniors make up 28.3%.

Historical population

Year	Pop.	±%
1861	98,650	—
1871	114,421	+16.0%
1881	124,964	+9.2%
1901	173,911	+39.2%
1911	181,520	+4.4%
1921	212,681	+17.2%
1931	230,507	+8.4%
1936	221,634	−3.8%

Year	Pop.	±%
1951	233,264	+5.2%
1961	239,256	+2.6%
1971	244,435	+2.2%
1981	241,371	−1.3%
1991	227,199	−5.9%
2001	215,935	−5.0%
2011	219,330	+1.6%
2021	215,117	−1.9%

Source: ISTAT

=== Immigration ===
As of 2025, immigrants make up 13.4% of the population. The 5 largest foreign countries of birth are Romania, the Dominican Republic, Albania, Morocco, and Bangladesh.

== Transport ==
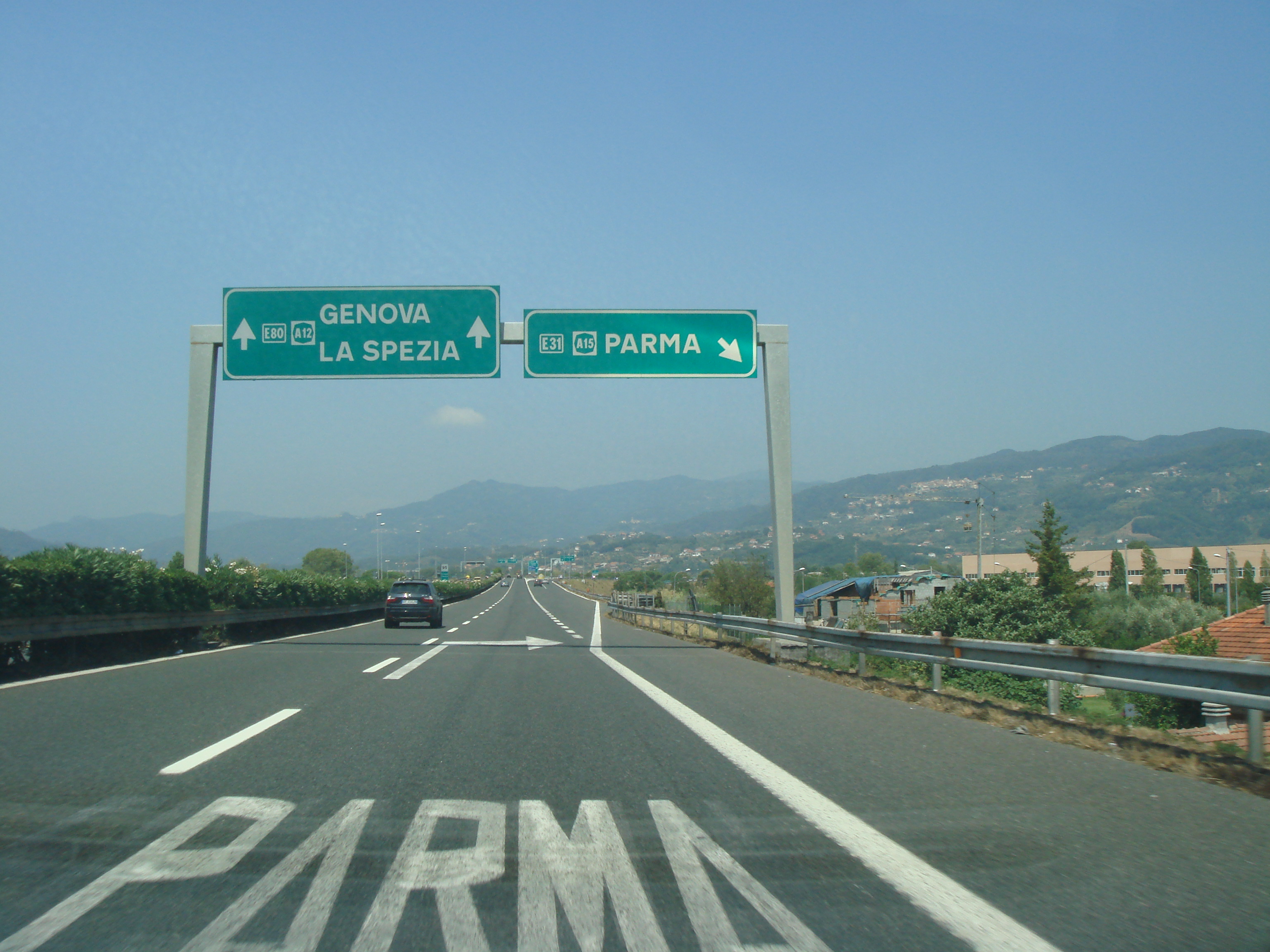
Autostrada A12 near Santo Stefano di Magra

Two main lines cross the territory: the "Tirrenica" line linking the province to Genoa and Rome, and the "Pontremolese" line that goes in the direction of Parma and Milan/Venice. There are regular trains that connect the province with other Italian cities, including Turin, Palermo and Ventimiglia.

In the province there is the airport of Luni, which is used only by general aviation. The nearest airports with international and intercontinental connections are: the airport Cristoforo Colombo of Genova, Firenze-Pisa airport, and Milan Malpensa airport.

There are two motorways that cross the territory. The Autostrada A12 which connects the province with Genoa and Livorno, and the Autostrada A15, which connects La Spezia to Parma.

Among the road development projects that are the subject of debate, they are mentioned: completion of the Aurelia Variation; interconnection of Via XXV aprile, in the Piana di Arcola, with the Aurelia; functional completion and regulatory adaptation of the Fornola junction (entrance in the direction of La Spezia and exit in the direction of Santo Stefano]; bypass Romito (link road that from the Sp331 bypasses the town, 'emerging' from the cemetery); the Santo Stefano-Ceparana bridge; the doubling of the Cisa state road between Santo Stefano and Sarzana; Muggiano-Ressora link road, which bypasses the town of San Terenzo; new infrastructure to the artisan urban plan of Tavolara (Sarzana); completion tunnel between the Gulf and Val di Vara, with exit at Piano di Valeriano.

== In popular culture ==
The fictional city of Portorosso in the 2021 animated film Luca was inspired by several towns in the province of La Spezia, such as Vernazza and Riomaggiore. The Pixar animation team visited Cinque Terre as well as Tellaro and Porto Venere for inspiration for the film.
