= Vernazza =

Vernazza Vernasa
- Comune
- Comune di Vernazza
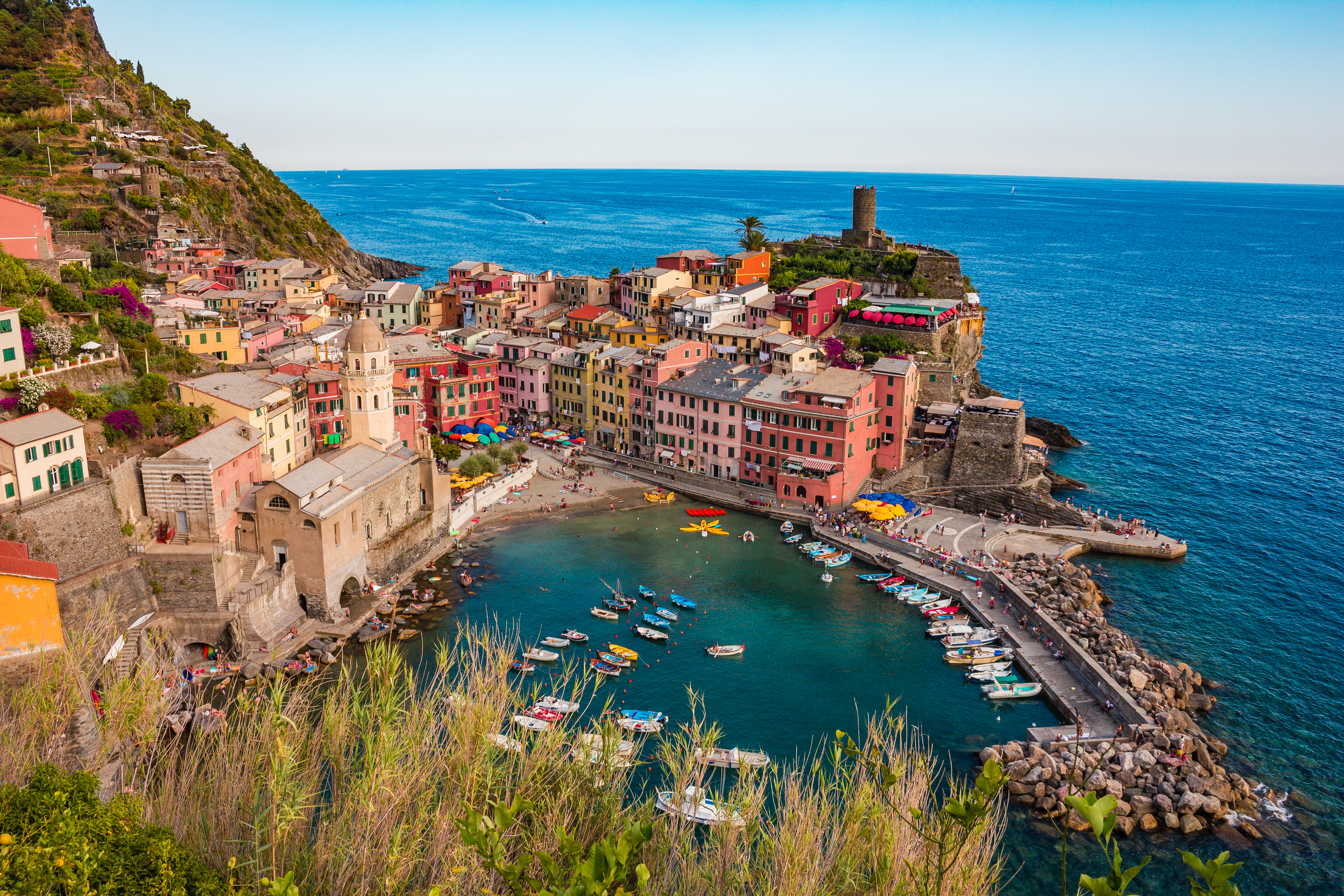
- Vernazza seen from the Azure Trail

- Coat of arms

- Location within Italy Location within Liguria
- Coordinates: 44°08′N 09°41′E
- Country: Italy
- Region: Liguria
- Province: La Spezia (SP)
- Founded: 1861
- Frazioni: Corniglia, Drignana, Muro, Prevo, San Bernardino

Government
  - Mayor: Marco Fenelli (Vernazza-Corniglia)

Area
  - Total: 12.3 km^{2} (4.7 sq mi)
- Elevation: 3 m (9.8 ft)

Population (July 2024)
  - Total: 703
  - Density: 57.2/km^{2} (148/sq mi)
- Demonym: Vernazzesi
- Time zone: UTC+1 (CET)
  - Summer (DST): UTC+2 (CEST)
- Postal code: 19018
- Dialing code: 0187
- ISTAT code: 011030
- Patron saint: Margaret the Virgin
- Saint day: 20 July
- Website: www.comune.vernazza.sp.it

Vernazza (Ligurian: Vernassa, locally Vernasa; Latin: Vulnetia) is a town and comune located in the province of La Spezia, Liguria, northwestern Italy. It is one of the five towns that make up the Cinque Terre region. Vernazza is the fourth town heading north, has no car traffic, and remains one of the truest "fishing villages" on the Italian Riviera. It is the only natural port of Cinque Terre and is famous for its elegant houses.

Vernazza's name is derived from the Latin adjective verna, meaning "native". The aptly named indigenous wine, vernaccia ("local" or "ours"), helped give birth to the village's name. It is one of I Borghi più belli d'Italia ("The most beautiful villages of Italy").

== History ==
The first records recognizing Vernazza as a fortified town date to 1080. Referred to as an active maritime base of the Obertenghi, a family of Italian nobility, it was a likely point of departure for naval forces in defence from pirates.

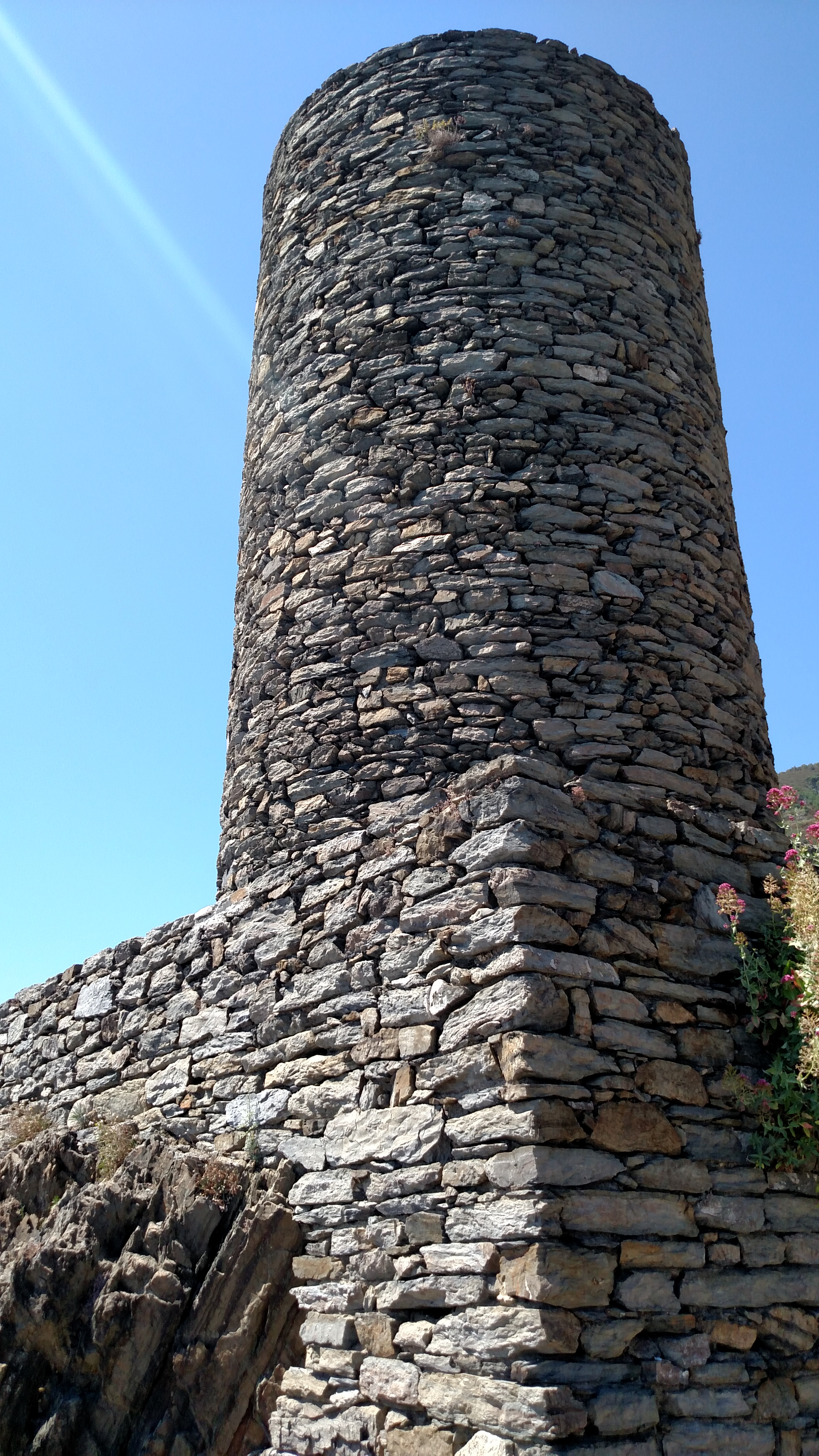
Tower of Castello Doria

Over the next two centuries, Vernazza was vital in Republic of Genoa's conquest of Liguria, providing port, fleet, and soldiers. In 1209, approximately 90 of the most powerful families of Vernazza pledged their allegiance to the republic of Genova.

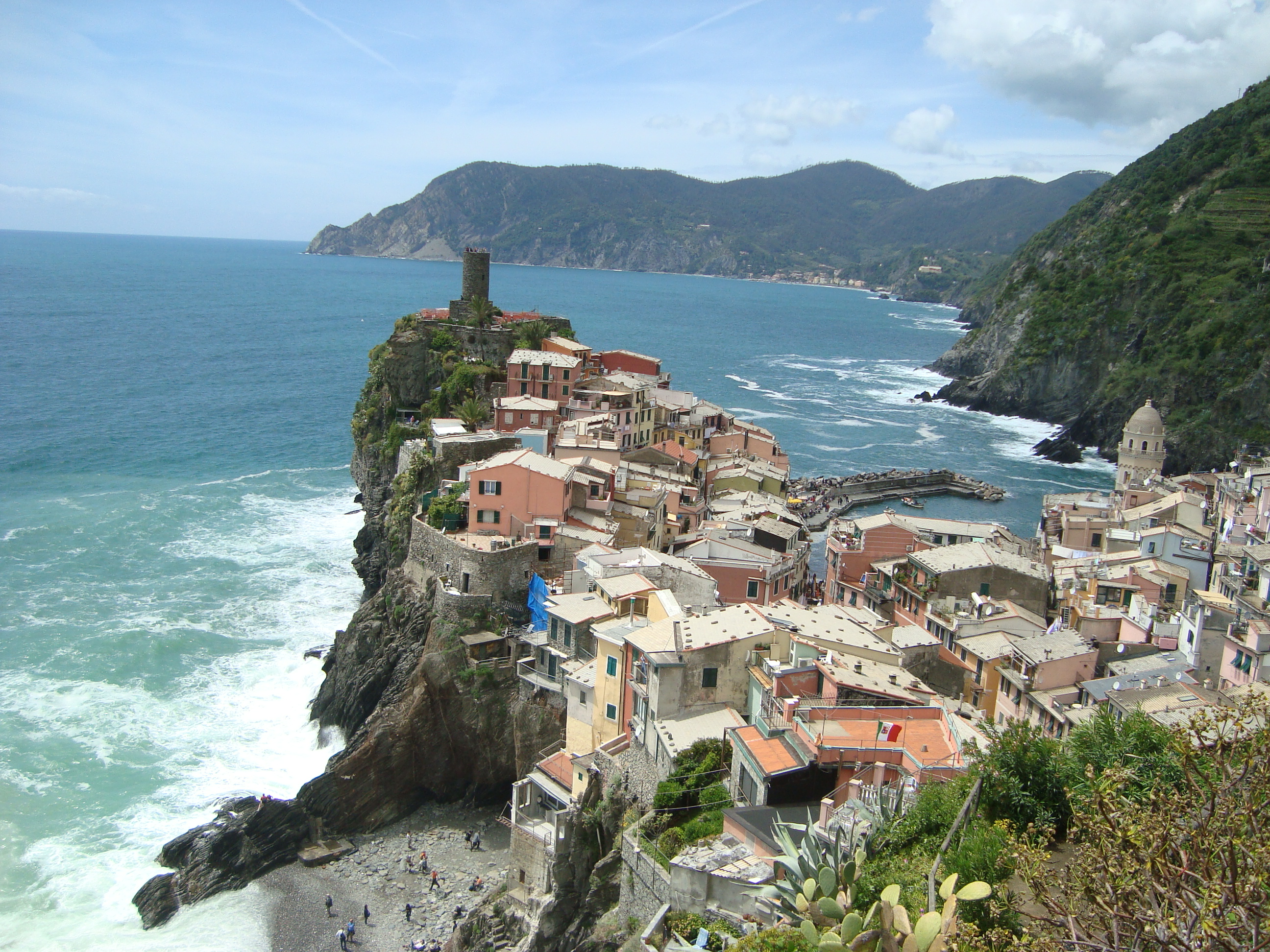
View from the south

The first documented presence of a church dates to 1251, with the parish of San Pietro cited in 1267. Reference to the Church of Santa Margherita d'Antiochia of Vernazza occurs in 1318. Some scholars are of the opinion, due to the use of materials and mode of construction, that the actual creation of the Church of Santa Margherita d'Antiochia took place earlier, some time in the 12th century. The Church of Santa Margherita d'Antiochia was expanded upon and renovated over the course of the 16th and 17th centuries, and thereafter was erected the octagonal bell tower that rises from the apse.

In the 15th century, Vernazza focused its defence against the dreadful and regularly occurring pirate raids, erecting a fortifying wall. In the mid-17th century, like many of the Cinque Terre villages, Vernazza suffered a period of decline that negatively affected wine production, and prolonged the construction of the trail system and harbour molo (mole constructed to protect against heavy seas).

In the 19th century, after a long period of stagnation, Vernazza returned to wine production, enlarging and creating new terraced hillsides. The result was a revitalisation of Vernazza's commerce. Also at this time, the construction of the Genoa–La Spezia rail line began, putting an end to Vernazza's long isolation. The population of Vernazza increased by 60% as a result. Meanwhile, the construction of La Spezia's naval base also proved important to Vernazza in providing employment for many members of the community.

With the arrival of the 20th century, Vernazza experienced a wave of emigration as working the land was viewed as dangerous and the cause of disease, and the ability to further exploit agriculture diminished.

In 1997, the Cinque Terre was recognised as a World Heritage Site by UNESCO and in 1999 the National Park of the Cinque Terre was created. Today the main source of revenue for Vernazza is tourism. However, as a testimony to the strength of centuries-old tradition, fishing, wine and olive oil production still continue.

On 25 October 2011, Vernazza was struck by torrential rains, massive flooding, and mudslides affecting not only Cinque Terre, but also Val di Vara and Val di Magra within Liguria, as well as the province of Lunigiana. The flood left the town buried in over 4 metres of mud and debris (submerging even the train station in mud), causing over 100 million euro worth of damage. The town was evacuated and remained in a state of emergency for many months.

== Main sights ==
- Church of Santa Margherita d'Antiochia, c. 1318. Unique for its east-facing entryway, it has a nave and two aisles, with an octagonal bell tower rising from the apse area, and is located in the town's main square Piazza Marconi.

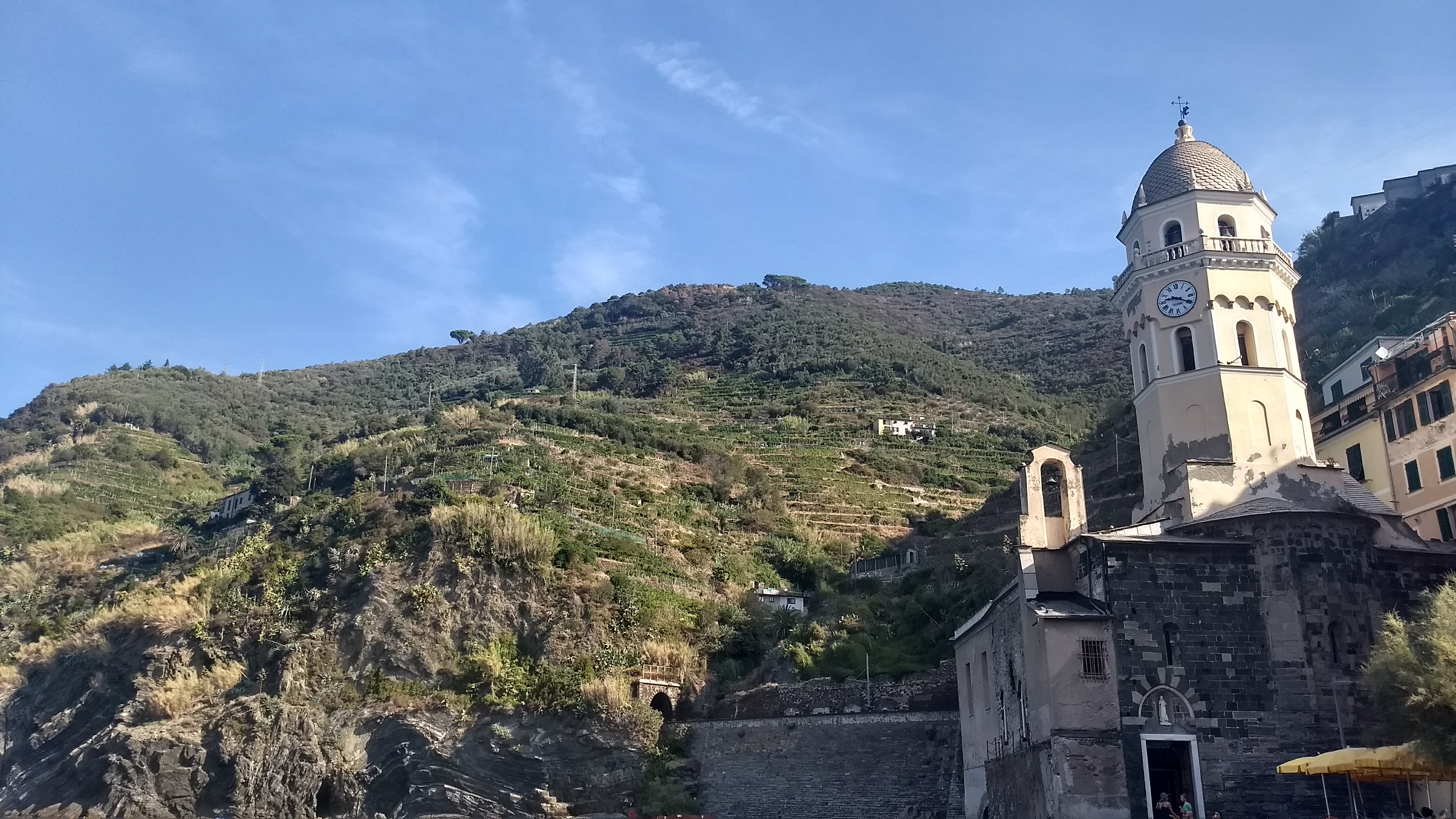
Church of Santa Margherita d'Antiochia

- Doria Castle - built in the 15th century as a lookout tower to protect the village from pirates.
- Sanctuary of Madonna di Reggio Santuario di Nostra Signora di Reggio, about an hour's steep walk above Vernazza. The path that leads up to the sanctuary is punctuated with the Stations of the Cross. The surrounding property of the sanctuary contains a large shady open area, expansive views of the hillside vineyards and coast.
- Chapel of Santa Marta, tiny stone chapel along Vernazza's main street, Via Roma. Mass celebrated on special Sundays.
- Vernazza's beach is off Piazza Marconi, within the protected harbour on the northwestern side.
- Tourists can use the local trail which connects all five towns of the Cinque Terre.

== In popular culture ==
The 2016 video game Hitman features a fictional town called Sapienza which is heavily influenced by Vernazza, including iconic sites such as the Chapel of Santa Marta and the Doria Castle.

The 2015 Video game Just Cause 3 features a fictional town called Manaea which is based on the Vernazza.

The 2021 animated film Luca was inspired by Vernazza and other Cinque Terre towns. Pixar animators visited Vernazza, and based the piazza of Portorosso on Vernazza's in particular.

== Gallery ==
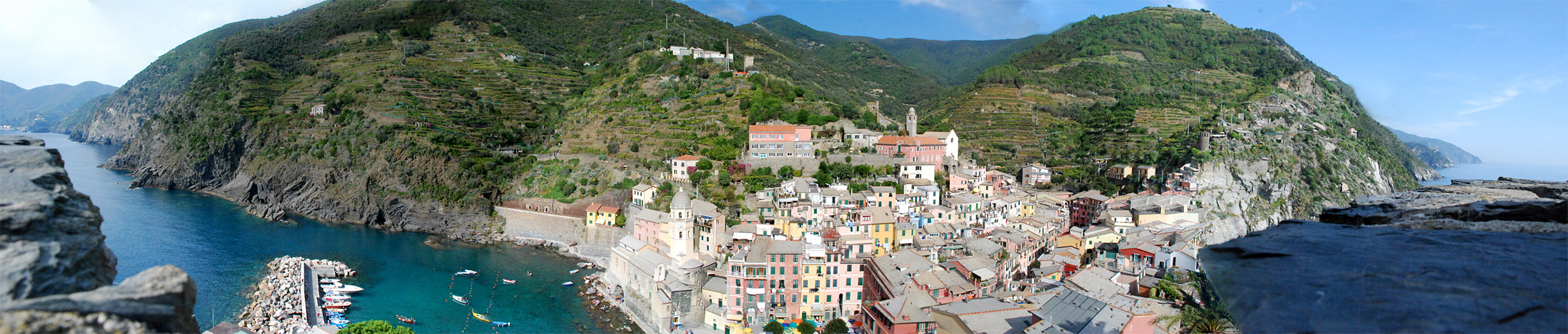
Panorama

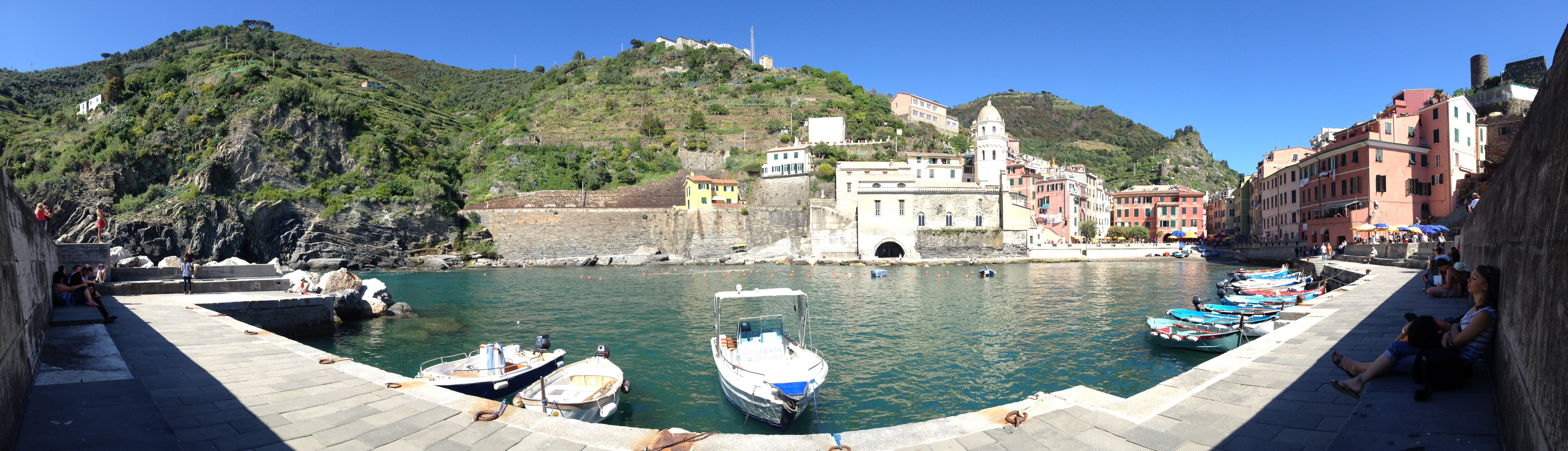
View from the harbor wall

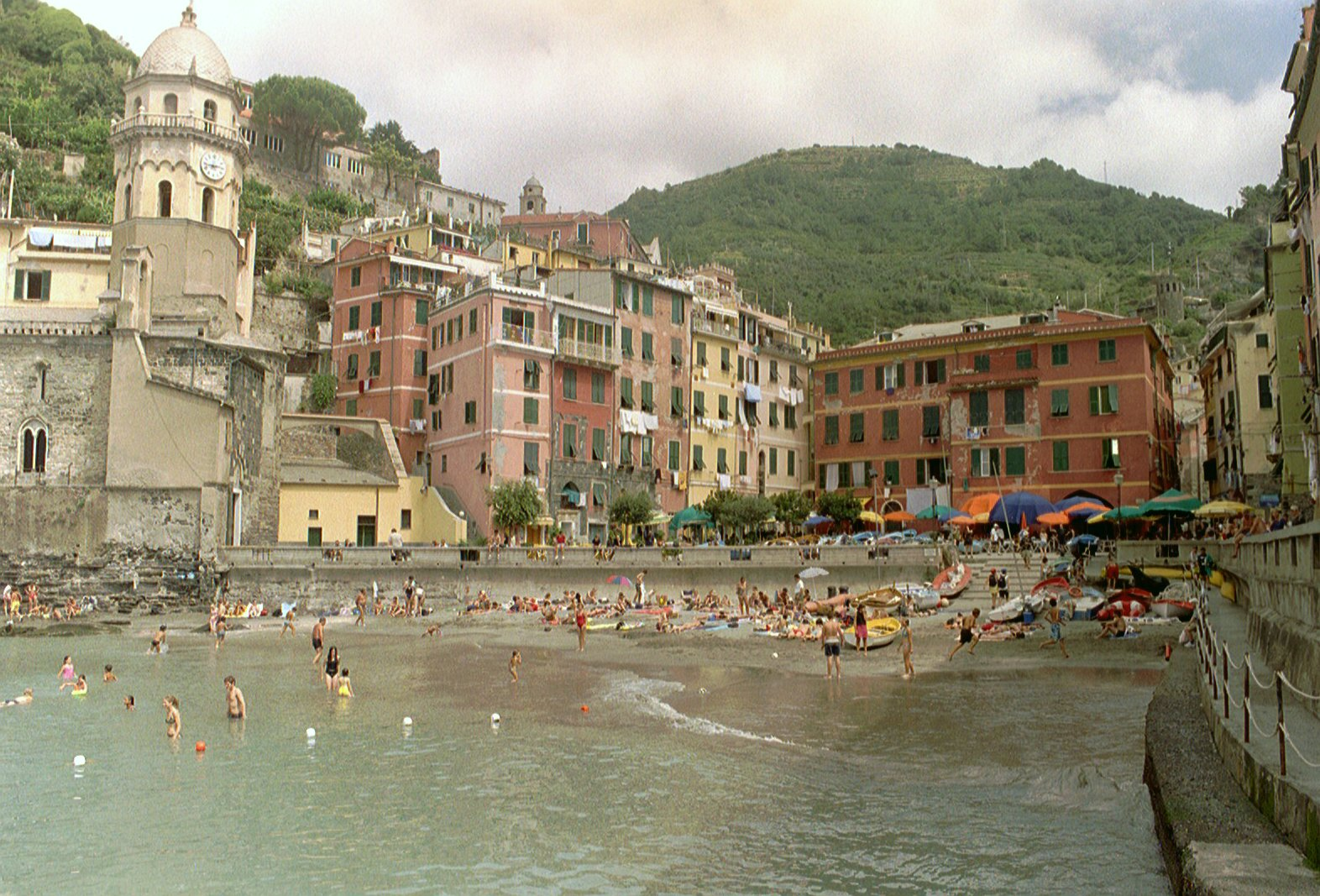

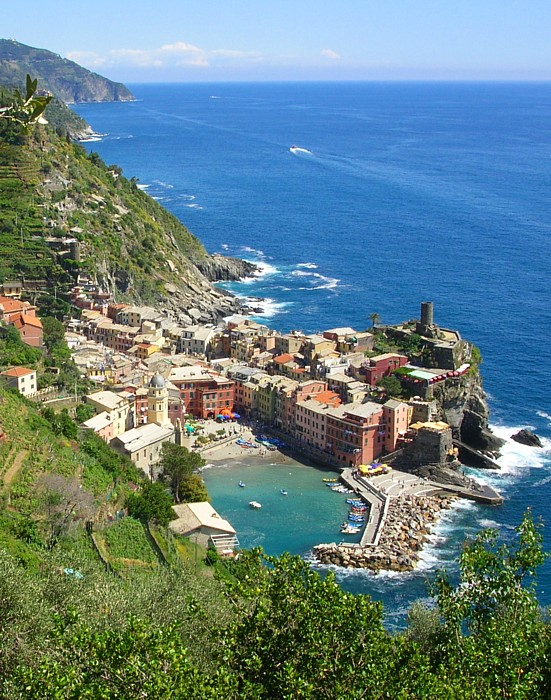

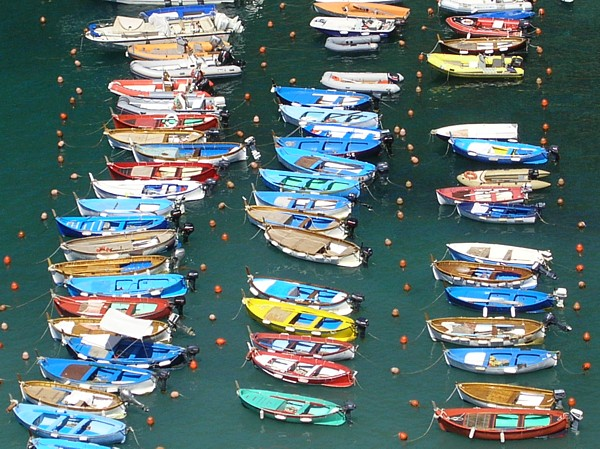

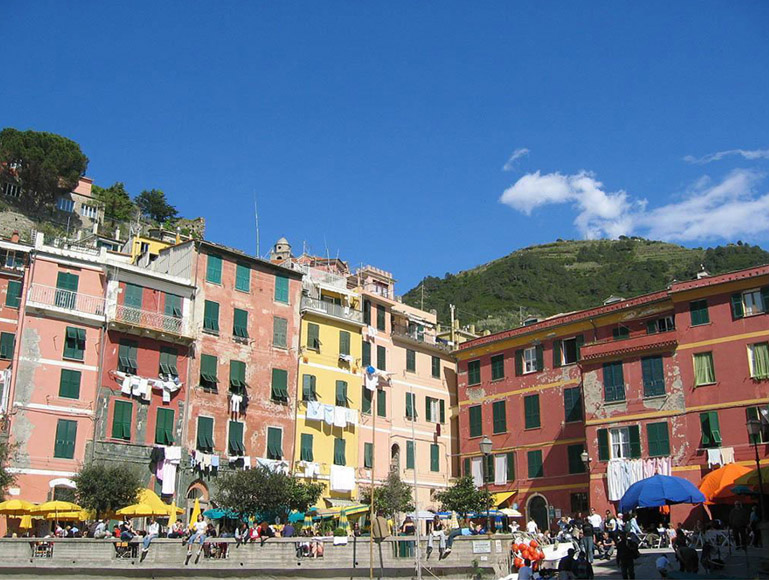

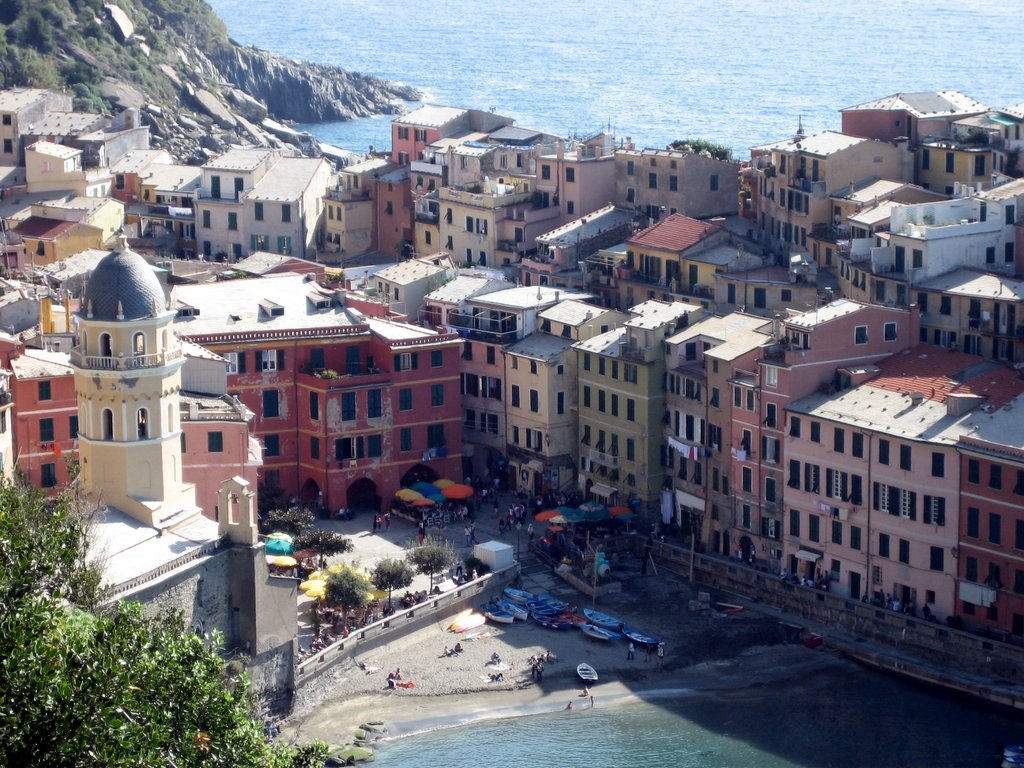

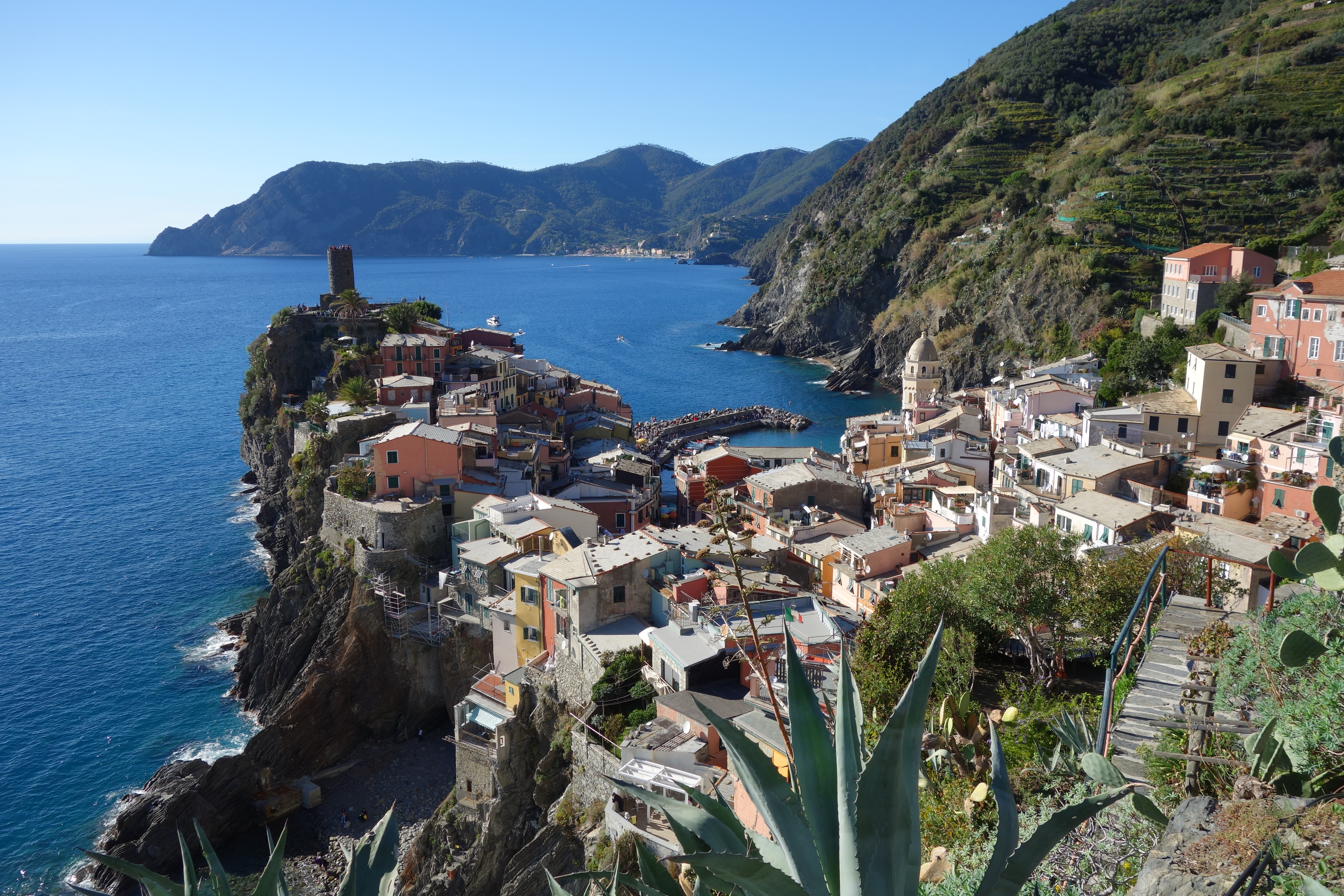
View of Vernazza
