= List of municipalities of the Province of La Spezia =

The following is a list of the 32 municipalities (comuni) of the Province of La Spezia in the region of Liguria in Italy.

== List ==
Municipality	Population (2026)	Area (km²)	Density
Ameglia	4,270	14.17	301.3
Arcola	10,229	16.54	618.4
Beverino	2,284	34.95	65.4
Bolano	7,456	14.57	511.7
Bonassola	761	9.19	82.8
Borghetto di Vara	928	27.34	33.9
Brugnato	1,291	11.90	108.5
Calice al Cornoviglio	1,023	33.75	30.3
Carro	489	31.79	15.4
Carrodano	459	21.86	21.0
Castelnuovo Magra	8,236	15.02	548.3
Deiva Marina	1,276	14.09	90.6
Follo	6,239	23.27	268.1
Framura	567	19.26	29.4
La Spezia	92,610	51.39	1,802.1
Lerici	9,143	16.01	571.1
Levanto	5,018	36.81	136.3
Luni	8,099	13.86	584.3
Maissana	567	45.43	12.5
Monterosso al Mare	1,289	10.94	117.8
Pignone	529	17.75	29.8
Portovenere	3,155	7.66	411.9
Riccò del Golfo di Spezia	3,643	37.76	96.5
Riomaggiore	1,260	10.27	122.7
Rocchetta di Vara	661	32.66	20.2
Santo Stefano di Magra	10,004	13.85	722.3
Sarzana	21,726	34.52	629.4
Sesta Godano	1,263	67.78	18.6
Varese Ligure	1,717	137.59	12.5
Vernazza	675	12.30	54.9
Vezzano Ligure	7,214	18.37	392.7
Zignago	458	28.70	16.0

== See also ==
- List of municipalities of Liguria
- List of municipalities of Italy
