= Castiglione Chiavarese =

Castiglione Chiavarese O Castiggion
- Comune
- Comune di Castiglione Chiavarese
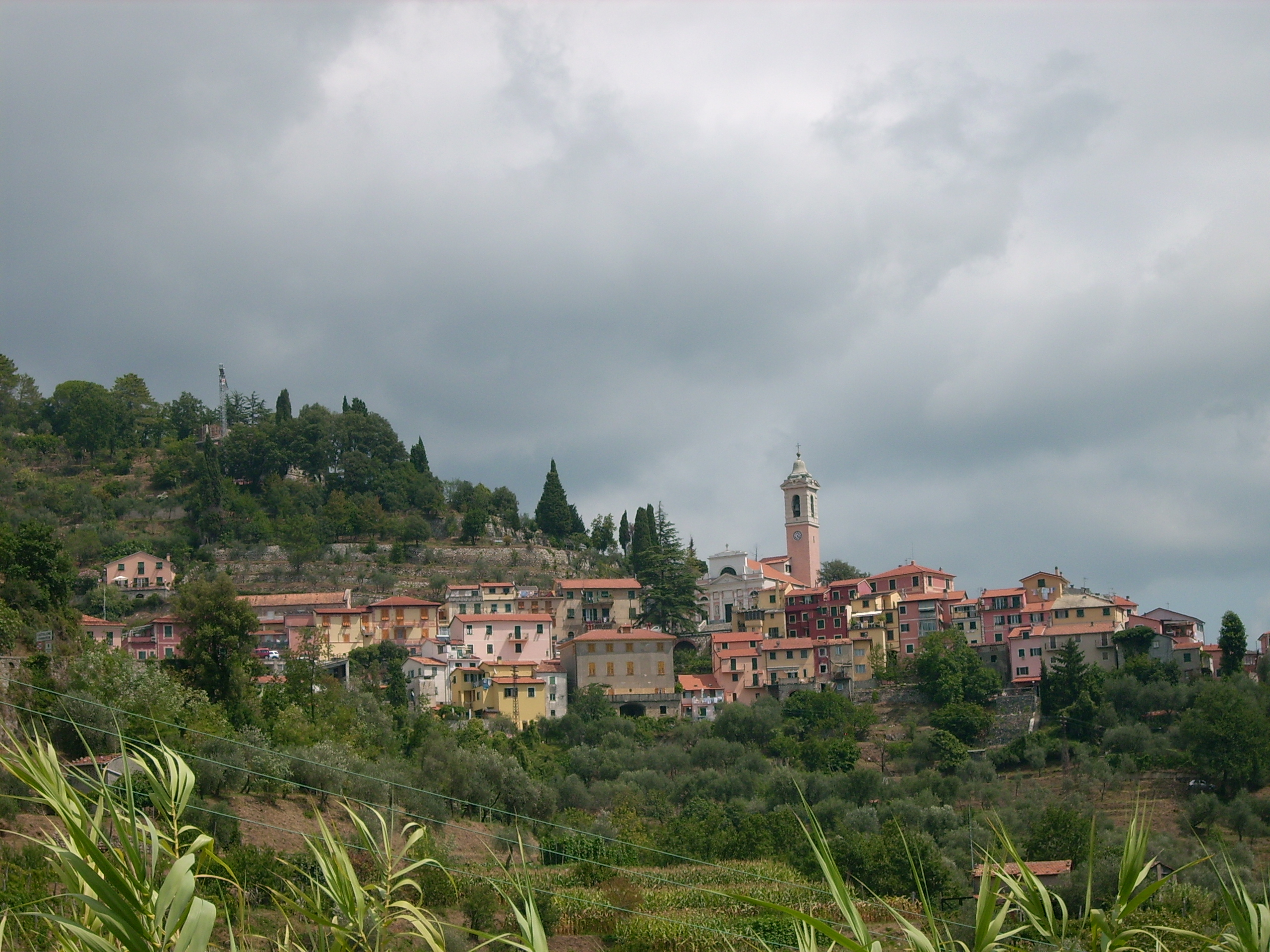

- Coat of arms

- Location within Italy Location within Liguria
- Coordinates: 44°17′N 9°31′E
- Country: Italy
- Region: Liguria
- Metropolitan city: Genoa (GE)
- Frazioni: Campegli, Casali, Conio, Fiume, Casa del Monte, Masso, Mereta, Missano, San Pietro Frascati, Velva, Velva Santuario

Government
  - Mayor: Giovanni Collorado

Area
  - Total: 30.1 km^{2} (11.6 sq mi)
- Elevation: 271 m (889 ft)

Population (30 June 2017)
  - Total: 1,591
  - Density: 52.9/km^{2} (137/sq mi)
- Demonym: Castiglionesi
- Time zone: UTC+1 (CET)
  - Summer (DST): UTC+2 (CEST)
- Postal code: 16030
- Dialing code: 0185
- Website: Official website

Castiglione Chiavarese (Ligurian: O Castiggion [u kastiˈdʒuŋ]) is a comune (municipality) in the Metropolitan City of Genoa in the Italian region Liguria, located about 50 kilometres (31 mi) southeast of Genoa.

Castiglione Chiavarese borders the following municipalities: Carro, Casarza Ligure, Deiva Marina, Maissana, Moneglia.

== History ==
In ancient times the area of Castiglione probably marked the border between the Ligurian and the Etruscan cultures. the modern frazione of Velva was a Roman municipium during Trajan's reign.

The Val Petronio was colonized by Benedictine monks after the fall of the Western Roman Empire; later it became a possession of the Fieschi family who, in 1276, sold Castiglione to the Republic of Genoa. In 1747, the latter built here a series of fortifications against the Austrians. In 1815, after a short Napoleonic rule, it was acquired by the Kingdom of Sardinia-Piedmont, becoming part of the newly unified Kingdom of Italy in 1861.

== Main sights ==
- Church of Sant'Antonino martire (1143)
- Conio Abbey (1664)
- Roman bridges and roads

== Transport ==
Castiglione Chiavarese is located across the SS523 State Road connecting it to Sestri Levante, which also houses the nearest railway station.

== Sources ==
- Figone, Fausto (1995). La Podesteria di Castiglione. Lineamenti storici. Chiavari.
