= Casarza Ligure =

Casarza Ligure Casersa
- Comune
- Comune di Casarza Ligure
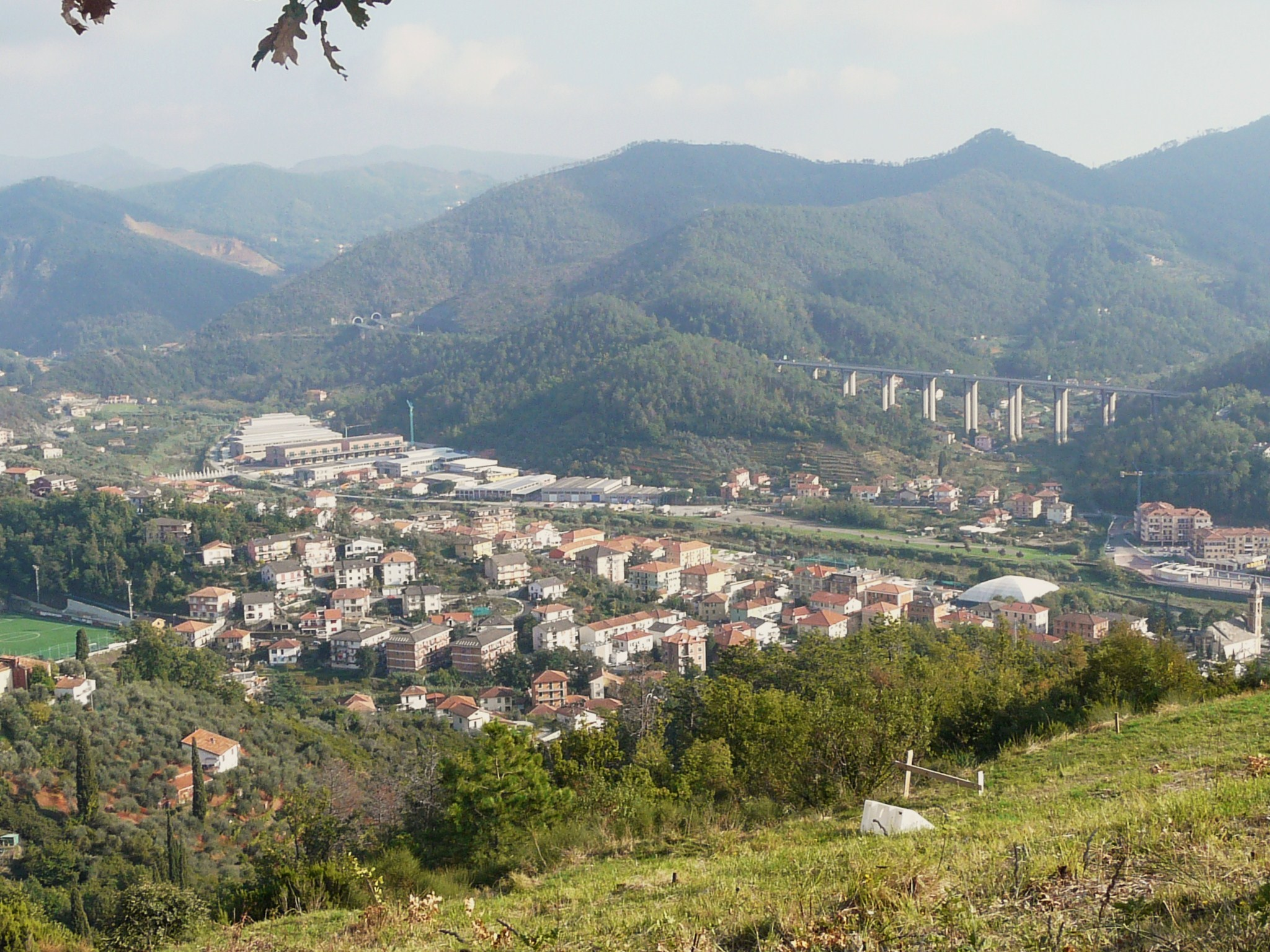
- Casarza Ligure

- Coat of arms

- Location within Italy Location within Liguria
- Coordinates: 44°16′N 9°26′E
- Country: Italy
- Region: Liguria
- Metropolitan city: Genoa (GE)
- Frazioni: Bargonasco, Bargone, Cardini, Massasco, Verici

Government
  - Mayor: Giovanni Stagnaro

Area
  - Total: 27.4 km^{2} (10.6 sq mi)
- Elevation: 34 m (112 ft)

Population (31 May 2017)
  - Total: 6,919
  - Density: 253/km^{2} (654/sq mi)
- Demonym: Casarzesi
- Time zone: UTC+1 (CET)
  - Summer (DST): UTC+2 (CEST)
- Postal code: 16030
- Dialing code: 0185
- Website: Official website

Casarza Ligure (Ligurian: Casersa) is a comune (municipality) in the Metropolitan City of Genoa in the Italian region Liguria, located about 45 kilometres (28 mi) southeast of Genoa.

Casarza Ligure borders the following municipalities: Castiglione Chiavarese, Maissana, Moneglia, Ne, Sestri Levante.
