= Sesta Godano =

- Comune
- Comune di Sesta Godano
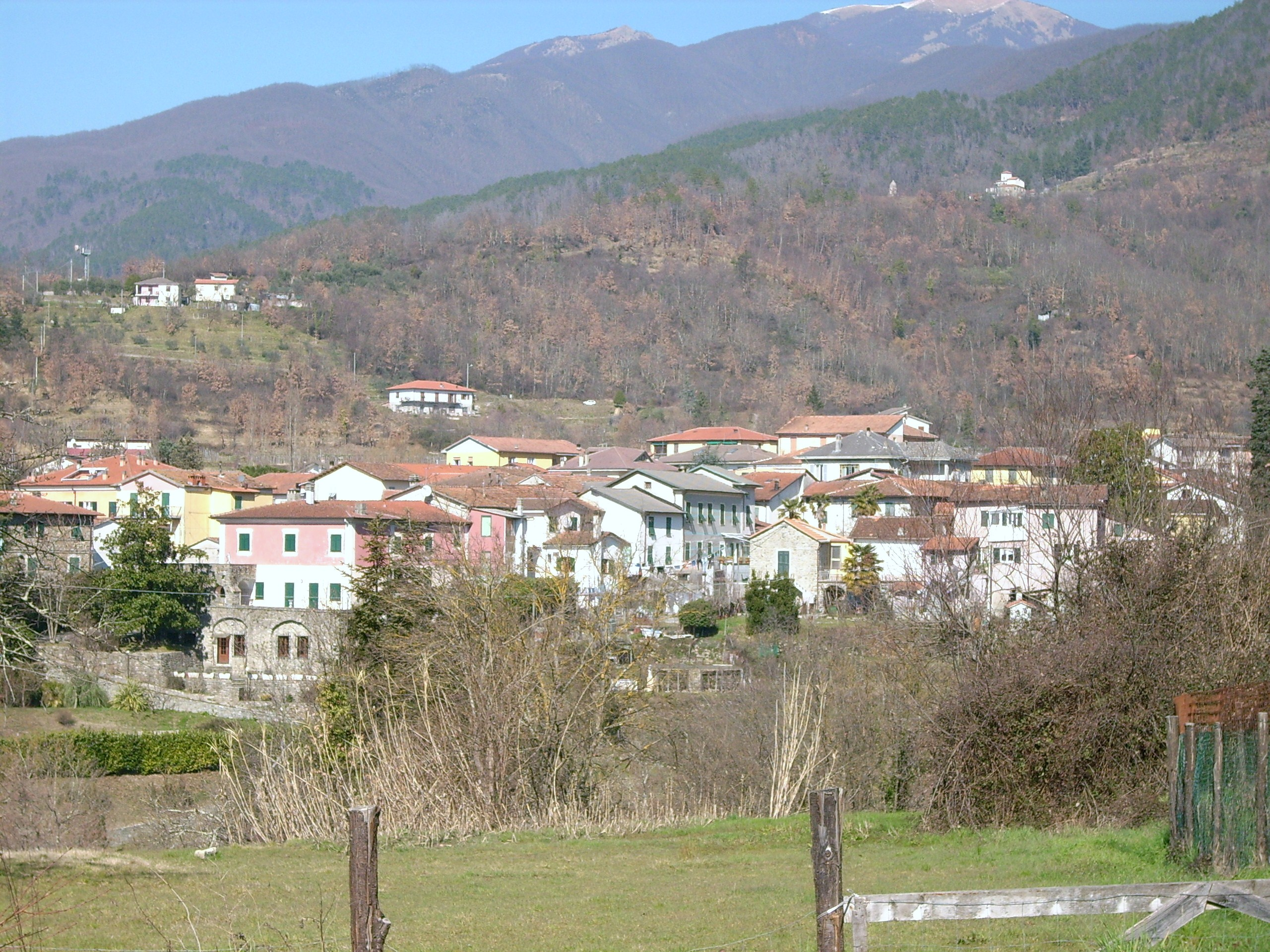

- Coat of arms

- Location within Italy Location within Liguria
- Coordinates: 44°17′N 9°40′E
- Country: Italy
- Region: Liguria
- Province: La Spezia (SP)
- Frazioni: Airola, Antessio, Bergassana, Chiusola, Cornice, Godano, Groppo, Mangia, Oradoro, Orneto, Pignona, Rio, Santa Maria, Scogna, Vizzà

Government
  - Mayor: Marco Traversone

Area
  - Total: 69.4 km^{2} (26.8 sq mi)
- Elevation: 242 m (794 ft)

Population (31 August 2021)
  - Total: 1,277
  - Density: 18.4/km^{2} (47.7/sq mi)
- Demonym: Godani
- Time zone: UTC+1 (CET)
  - Summer (DST): UTC+2 (CEST)
- Postal code: 19020
- Dialing code: 0187
- Website: Official website

Sesta Godano (Ligurian: A Sesta) is a comune (municipality) in the Province of La Spezia in the Italian region Liguria, located about 60 kilometres (37 mi) east of Genoa and about 25 kilometres (16 mi) northwest of La Spezia.

Sesta Godano borders the following municipalities: Albareto, Borghetto di Vara, Brugnato, Carro, Carrodano, Varese Ligure, Zeri, Zignago.

== See also ==
- Angelo Acerbi
