= Rocchetta di Vara =

- Comune
- Comune di Rocchetta di Vara
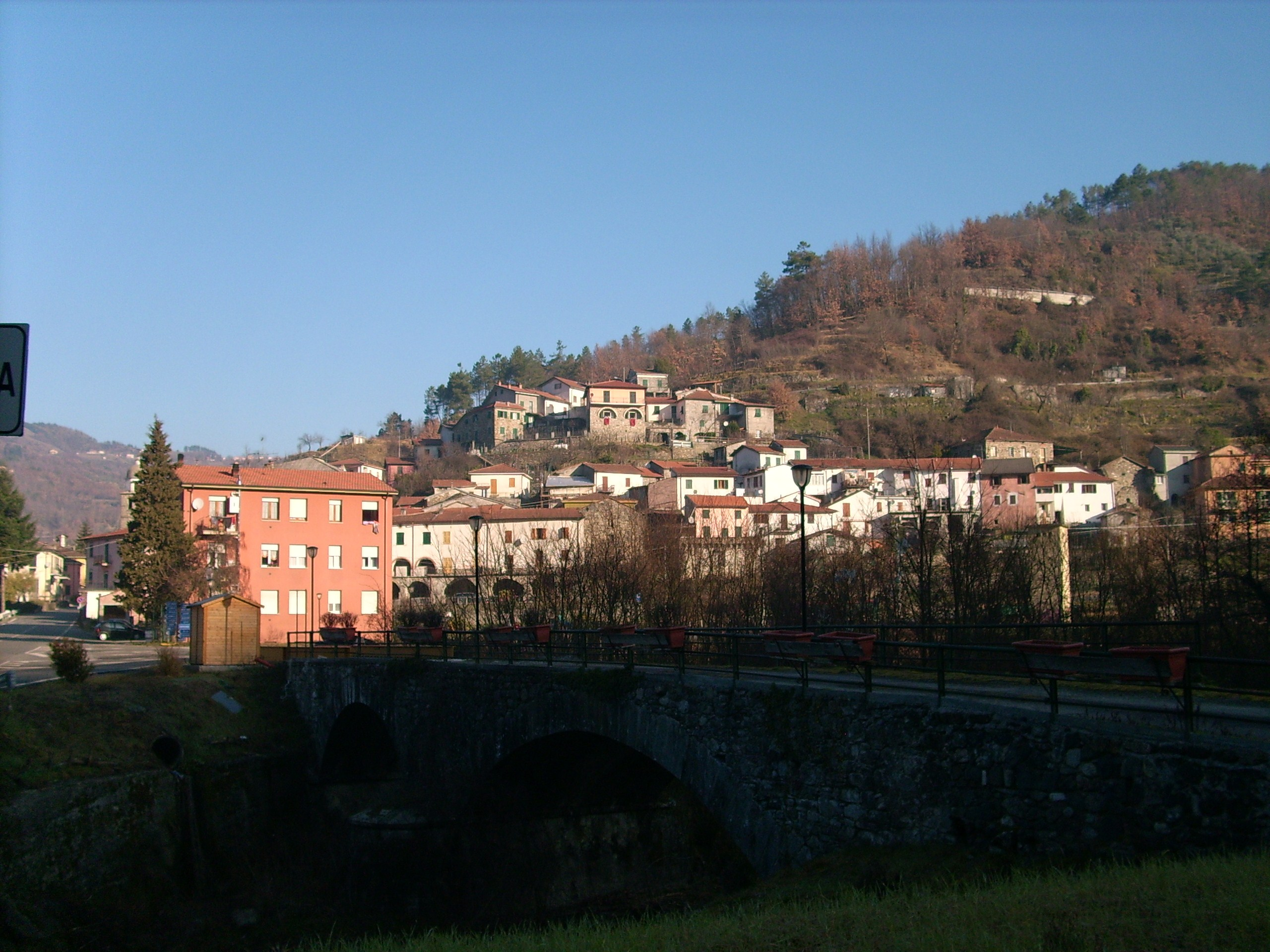
- Rocchetta di Vara

- Coat of arms

- Location within Italy Location within Liguria
- Coordinates: 44°12′N 9°47′E
- Country: Italy
- Region: Liguria
- Province: La Spezia (SP)

Government
  - Mayor: Riccardo Barotti

Area
  - Total: 32.3 km^{2} (12.5 sq mi)
- Elevation: 220 m (720 ft)

Population (31 December 2015)
  - Total: 703
  - Density: 21.8/km^{2} (56.4/sq mi)
- Demonym: Rocchettesi
- Time zone: UTC+1 (CET)
  - Summer (DST): UTC+2 (CEST)
- Postal code: 19020
- Dialing code: 0187
- Website: Official website

Rocchetta di Vara (Ligurian: A Rocheta) is a comune (municipality) in the Province of La Spezia in the Italian region Liguria, located about 70 kilometres (43 mi) southeast of Genoa and about 11 kilometres (7 mi) north of La Spezia.

Rocchetta di Vara borders the following municipalities: Beverino, Borghetto di Vara, Brugnato, Calice al Cornoviglio, Mulazzo, Zeri, Zignago.
