= Carrodano =

- Comune
- Comune di Carrodano
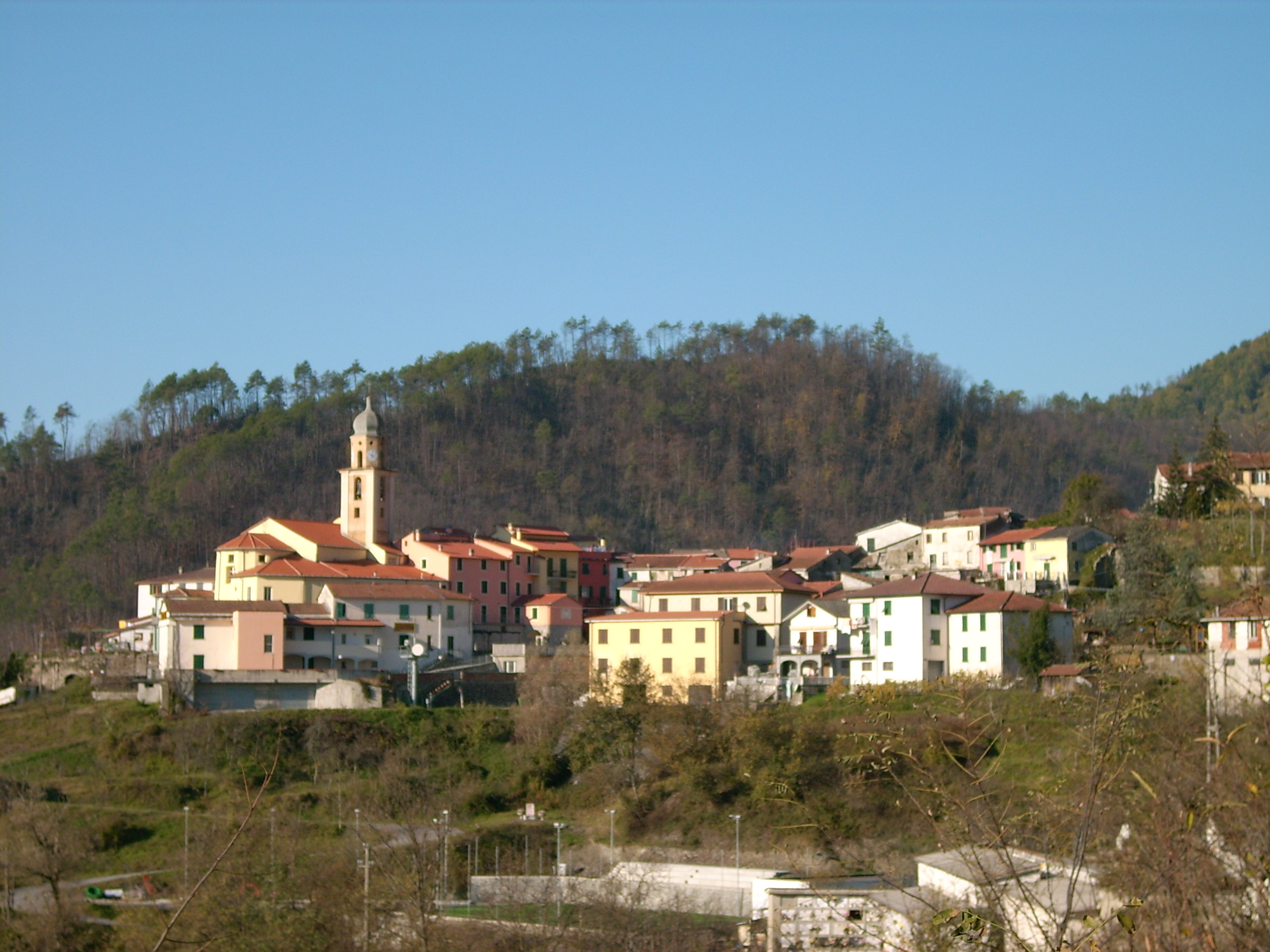
- Carrodano

- Coat of arms

- Location within Italy Location within Liguria
- Coordinates: 44°15′N 9°39′E
- Country: Italy
- Region: Liguria
- Province: Province of La Spezia (SP)

Area
  - Total: 21.0 km^{2} (8.1 sq mi)

Population (Dec. 2004)
  - Total: 532
  - Density: 25.3/km^{2} (65.6/sq mi)
- Time zone: UTC+1 (CET)
  - Summer (DST): UTC+2 (CEST)
- Postal code: 19020
- Dialing code: 0187

Carrodano (Ligurian: Carreu, locally Caröa) is a comune (municipality) in the Province of La Spezia in the Italian region Liguria, located about 60 kilometres (37 mi) southeast of Genoa and about 20 kilometres (12 mi) northwest of La Spezia. As of 31 December 2004, it had a population of 532 and an area of 21.0 square kilometres (8.1 mi^{2}).

Carrodano borders the following municipalities: Borghetto di Vara, Carro, Deiva Marina, Framura, Levanto, Sesta Godano.

== Demographic evolution ==
Historical population

| Year | Pop. | ±% |
|---|---|---|
| 1861 | 1,451 | — |
| 1871 | 1,315 | −9.4% |
| 1881 | 1,415 | +7.6% |
| 1901 | 1,170 | −17.3% |
| 1911 | 1,213 | +3.7% |

| Year | Pop. | ±% |
|---|---|---|
| 1921 | 1,194 | −1.6% |
| 1931 | 1,159 | −2.9% |
| 1936 | 1,188 | +2.5% |
| 1951 | 999 | −15.9% |
| 1961 | 888 | −11.1% |

| Year | Pop. | ±% |
|---|---|---|
| 1971 | 724 | −18.5% |
| 1981 | 596 | −17.7% |
| 1991 | 569 | −4.5% |
| 2001 | 545 | −4.2% |

Source: Data from ISTAT
