= Carro =

- Comune
- Comune di Carro
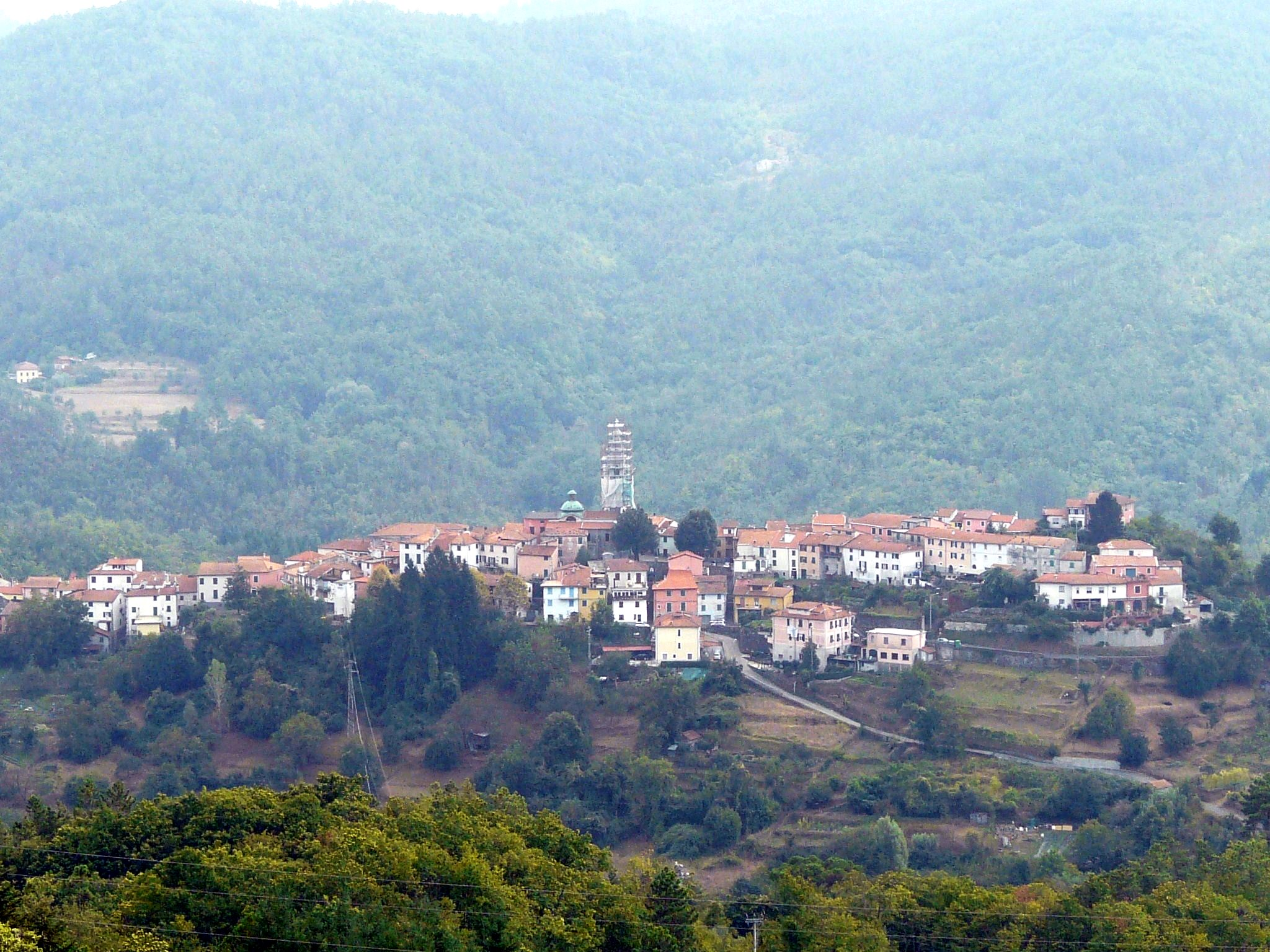
- Carro

- Coat of arms

- Location within Italy Location within Liguria
- Coordinates: 44°16′N 9°36′E
- Country: Italy
- Region: Liguria
- Province: Province of La Spezia (SP)webos

Government
  - Mayor: Antonio Solari

Area
  - Total: 5,000 km^{2} (1,900 sq mi)
- Elevation: 418 m (1,371 ft)

Population (31 May 2017)
  - Total: 538
  - Density: 0.11/km^{2} (0.28/sq mi)
- Demonym: Carresi
- Time zone: UTC+1 (CET)
  - Summer (DST): UTC+2 (CEST)
- Postal code: 19012
- Dialing code: 0187
- Patron saint: San Lorenzo
- Saint day: 10 agosto
- Website: Official website

Carro (Ligurian: O Caro, locally U Caru) is a comune (municipality) at the Province of La Spezia in the Italian region Liguria, located about 60 kilometres (37 mi) southeast of Genoa and about 25 kilometres (16 mi) northwest of La Spezia.

Carro borders the following municipalities: Carrodano, Castiglione Chiavarese, Deiva Marina, Maissana, Sesta Godano, Varese Ligure.
