= Conscenti =

- Frazione
- Location of Conscenti in Italy
- Coordinates: 44°35′N 9°4′E
- Country: Italy
- Region: Liguria
- Province: Genoa
- Comune: Ne
- Elevation: 68 m (223 ft)

Population (2001)
  - Total: 726
- Time zone: UTC+1 (CET)
  - Summer (DST): UTC+2 (CEST)
- Postal code: 16040
- Dialing code: 01850
- Patron saint: Saint Laurence
- Saint day: August 10

Conscenti is a frazione (a subdivision roughly equivalent to hamlet, ward, or parish) of the Italian municipality of Ne. It is located approximately 1 km from Ne, and serves as the municipality's seat of government. Its population in 2001 was 726.

The municipality's public library is located in Conscenti. Opened on May 28, 1998, it is managed by the board of education of the neighboring town of Cogorno, and is dedicated to Hugo Plomteux, the Belgian scholar of Ligurian cultural and linguistic heritage.

The family of the founder of the modern, united Italian state, Giuseppe Garibaldi, originated in the nearby Graveglia Valley. A monument to Garibaldi is located in Conscenti.

The following annual events are held in Conscenti:

- Graveglia Valley agricultural produce market every Saturday morning from May 28 to October 28
- The Agriculture Fair during the month of July.
- "Dinner under the stars" during the month of August.
- The Feast of Saint Lawrence, the patron saint of the town, on August 10
- Christmas Market during the month of December.

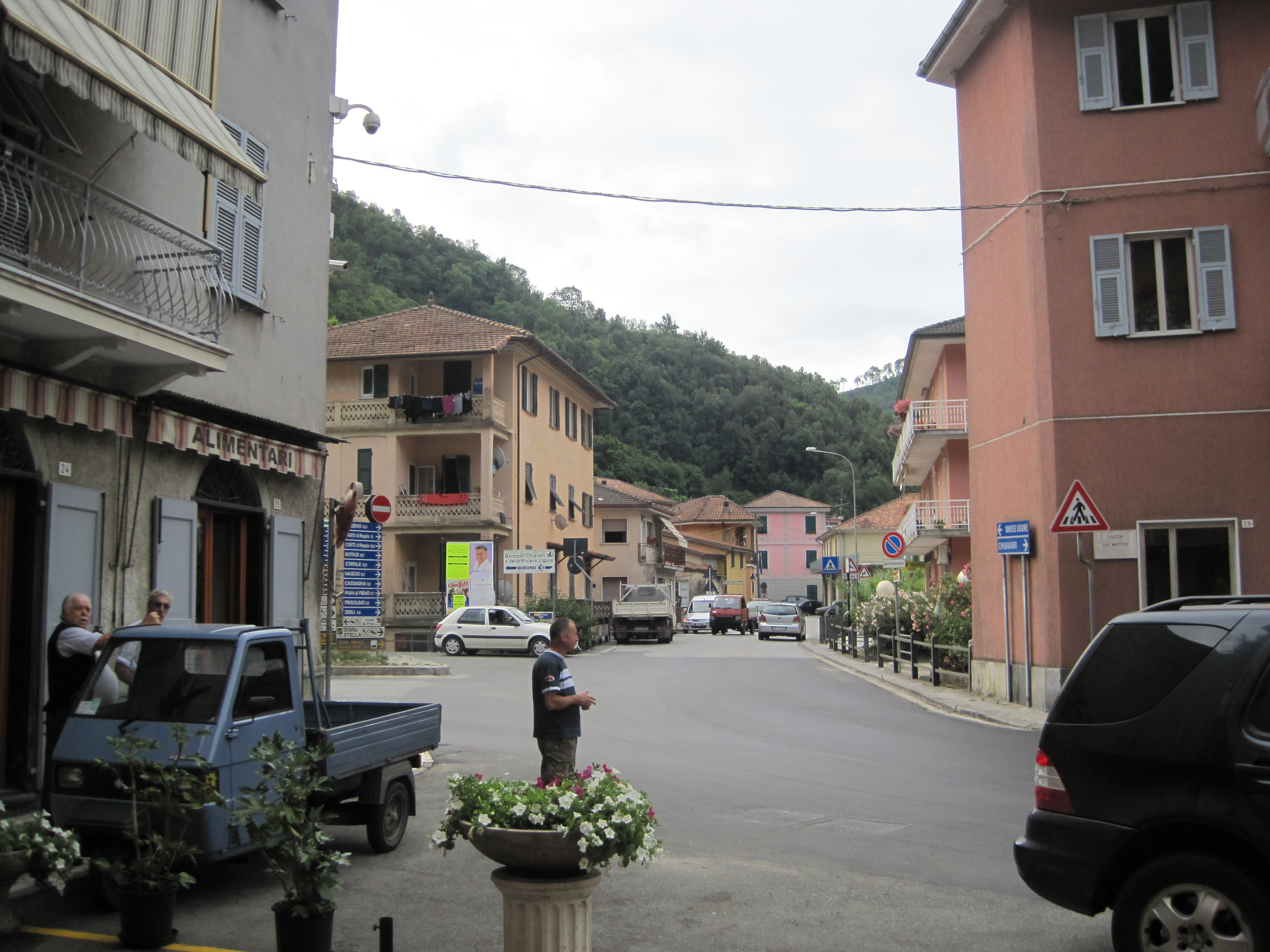
Town center, Conscenti

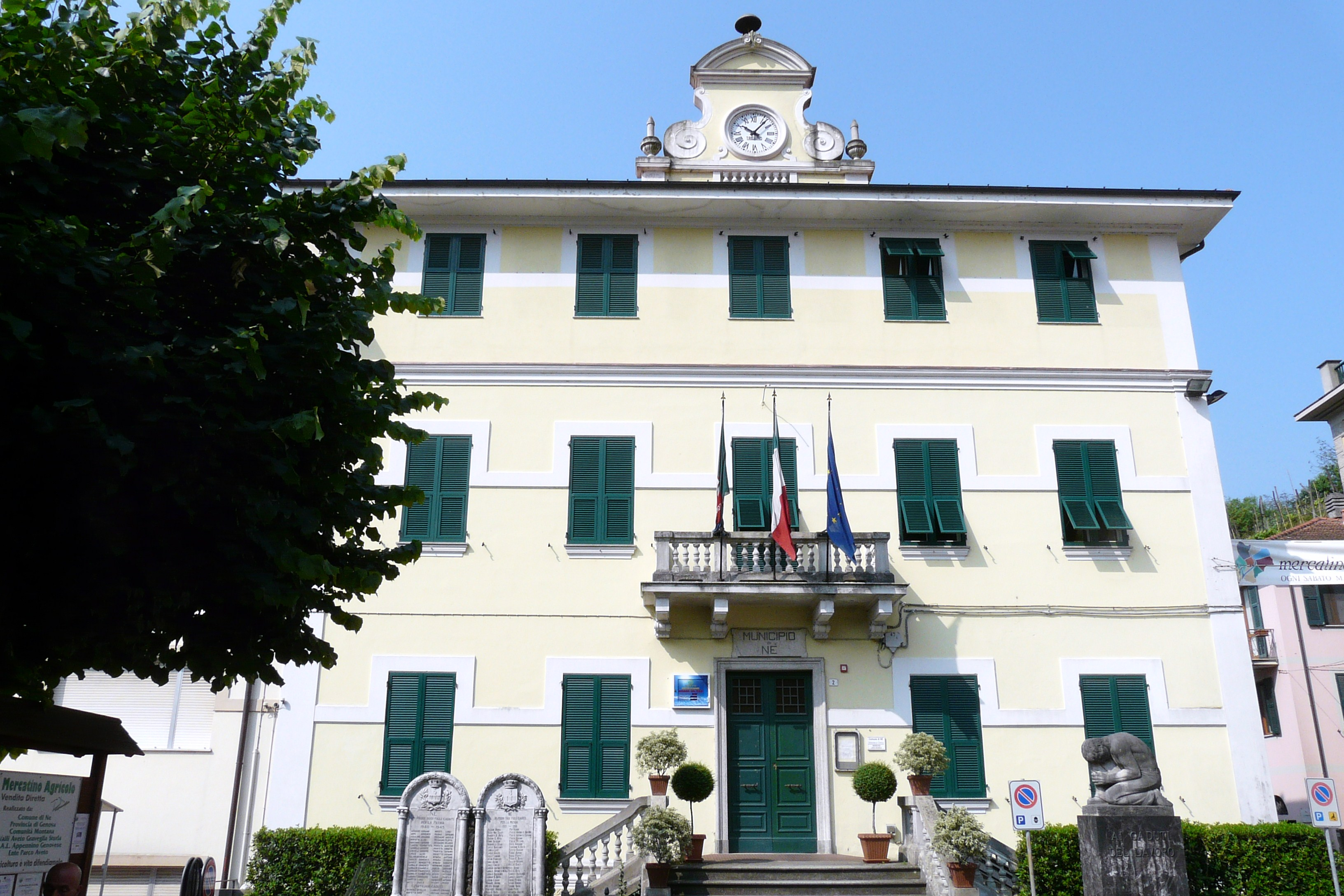
Town hall at Conscenti, the municipal seat of Ne

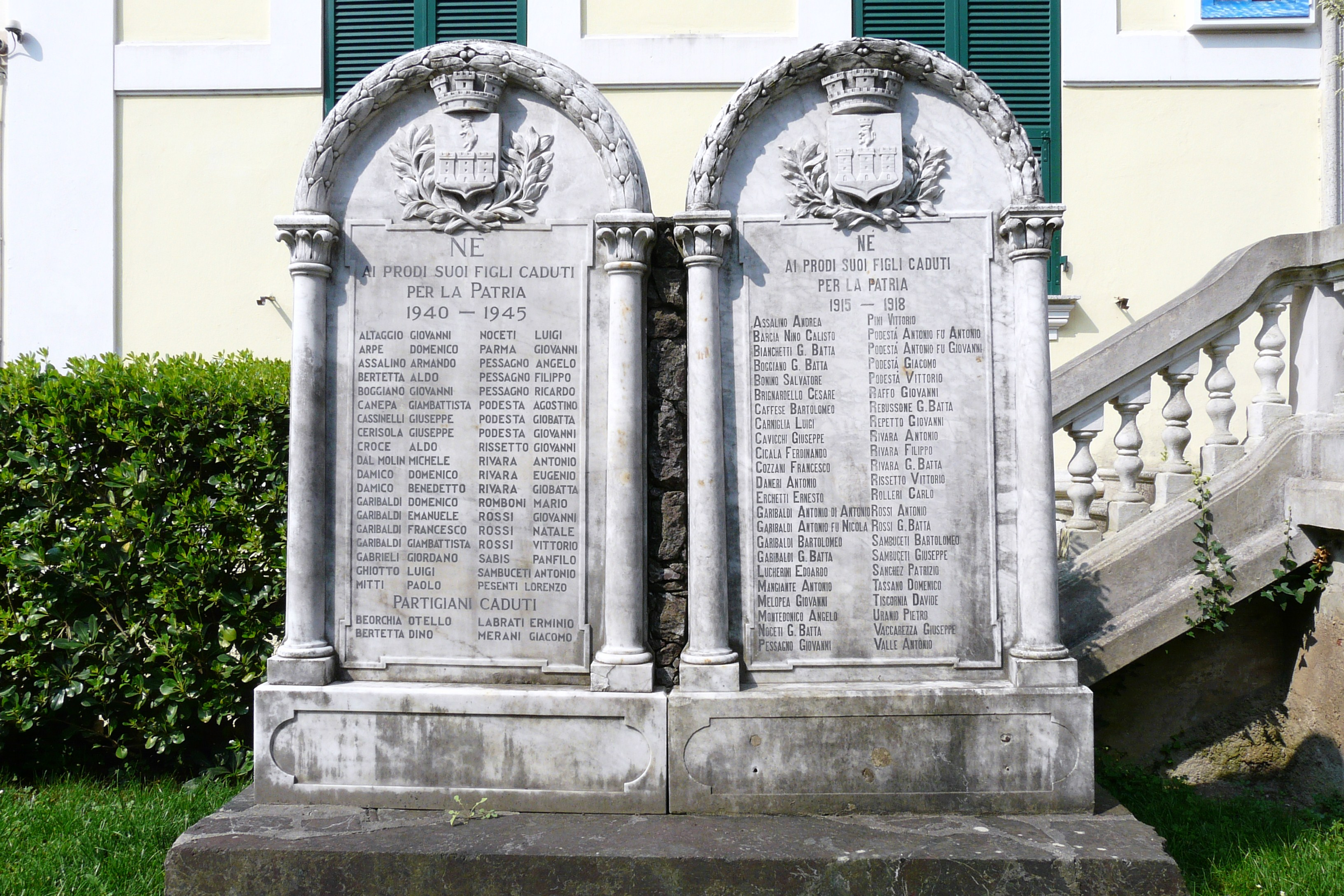
Concenti's WWI and WWII memorials.

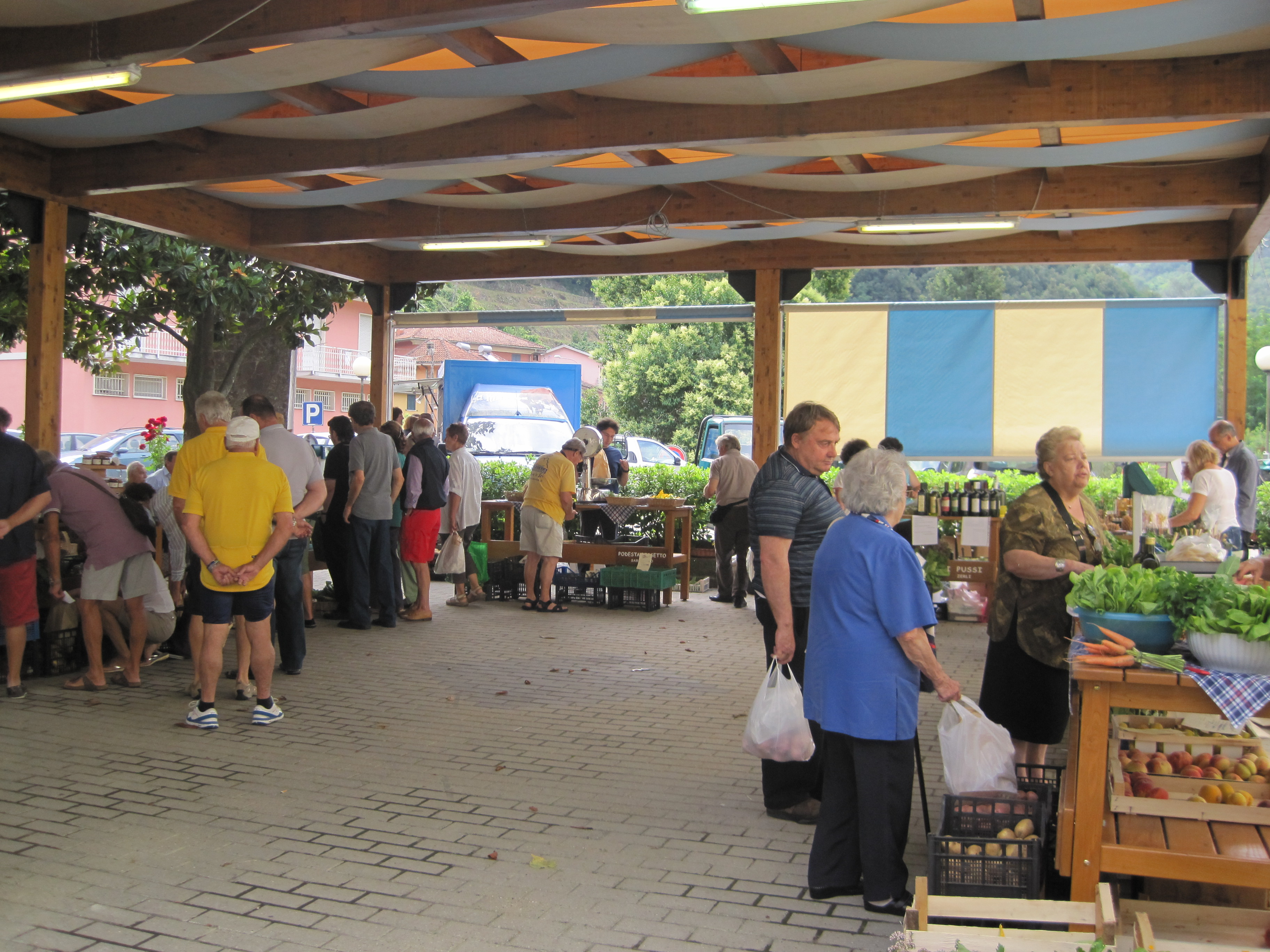
Concenti's farmers' market
