= Zignago =

- Comune
- Comune di Zignago
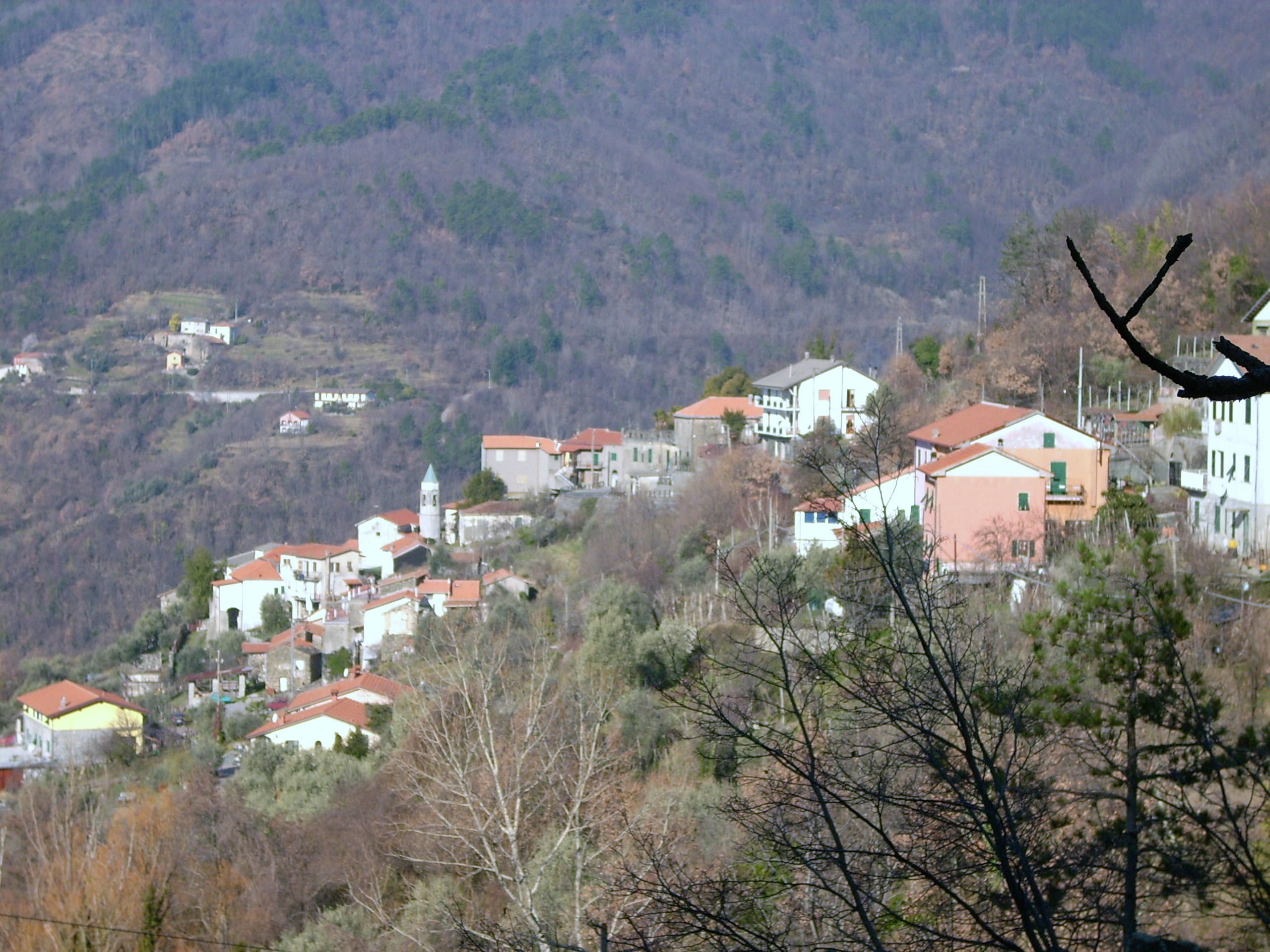
- Zignago

- Coat of arms

- Location within Italy Location within Liguria
- Coordinates: 44°17′N 9°45′E
- Country: Italy
- Region: Liguria
- Province: La Spezia (SP)
- Frazioni: Torpiana

Government
  - Mayor: Simone Sivori

Area
  - Total: 27.8 km^{2} (10.7 sq mi)
- Elevation: 632 m (2,073 ft)

Population (31 December 2015)
  - Total: 532
  - Density: 19.1/km^{2} (49.6/sq mi)
- Demonym: Zignaghesi
- Time zone: UTC+1 (CET)
  - Summer (DST): UTC+2 (CEST)
- Postal code: 19020
- Dialing code: 0187
- Patron saint: Our Lady of Dragnone
- Saint day: 8 September
- Website: Official website

Zignago (Ligurian: Zignego, locally Zignaigu) is a comune (municipality) in the Province of La Spezia in the Italian region Liguria, located about 70 kilometres (43 mi) east of Genoa and about 20 kilometres (12 mi) north of La Spezia.

Zignago borders the following municipalities: Brugnato, Rocchetta di Vara, Sesta Godano, Zeri.

== History ==
=== The Torpiana massacre (1945) ===
In April 1945, the hilly territory of Torpiana was the scene of the summary execution of twenty-three soldiers of the National Republican Guard (Guardia Nazionale Repubblicana - GNR). They had been taken prisoner by the "Zignago" Battalion, a unit belonging to the Giustizia e Libertà partisan column, following the surrender of the garrison of Borghetto di Vara on 12 April. The prisoners were marched on foot to the hamlet and shot near a local natural cave historically known as the "Tana du Cadin du Mazendà", where the bodies were hidden. Despite being hidden in the cave, two wounded soldiers (including Giuseppe Pocci) initially managed to escape during the night, but were subsequently tracked down in the surrounding area and killed.

The historical memory of the event was preserved both through the parish diary of the priest at the time, Father Ravini, and thanks to decades of research spearheaded by Carlo Pocci, the son of one of the victims. In the early 2000s, a complex investigation by the Judicial Police and Deputy Prosecutor General Luigi Cavadini Lenuzza established that the executions were preceded by severe torture, violence, and abuse of the prisoners. Due to the particular brutality of these acts, the magistrates of the General Prosecutor's Office ruled out the applicability of the political amnesty (the so-called "Togliatti amnesty"). However, the criminal proceedings against the surviving suspects were ultimately dismissed by the judge for preliminary investigations due to the statute of limitations, as the legal limit had expired on 12 April 1960.
