= Maissana =

- Comune
- Comune di Maissana
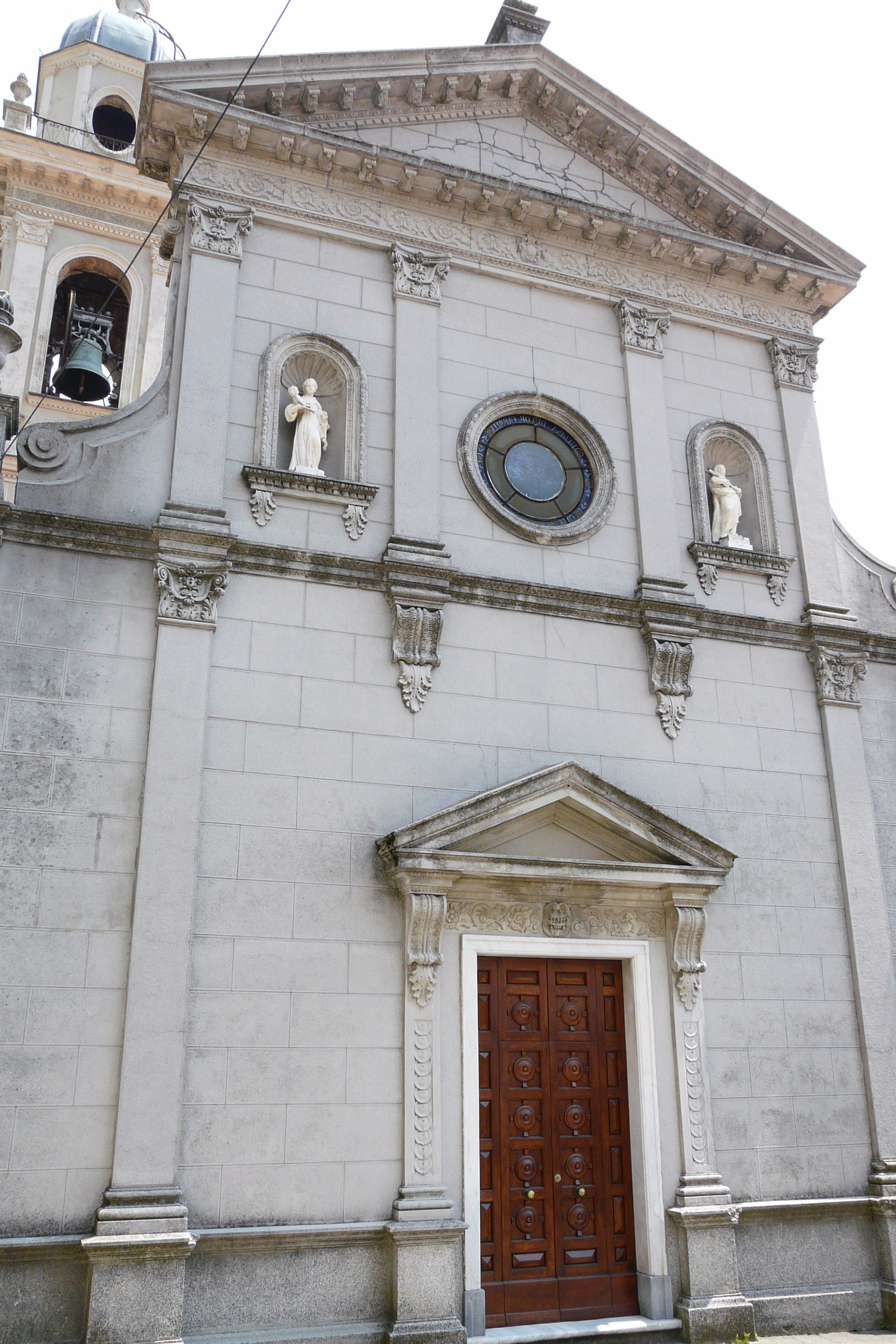
- Church of St. Bartholomew.

- Coat of arms

- Location within Italy Location within Liguria
- Coordinates: 44°20′N 9°32′E
- Country: Italy
- Region: Liguria
- Province: La Spezia (SP)
- Frazioni: Campore, Cembrano, Chiama, Colli, Disconesi, Ossegna, Salterana, Santa Maria, Tavarone, Torza

Government
  - Mayor: Egidio Banti

Area
  - Total: 45.5 km^{2} (17.6 sq mi)
- Elevation: 575 m (1,886 ft)

Population (30 September 2017)
  - Total: 617
  - Density: 13.6/km^{2} (35.1/sq mi)
- Demonym: Maissanesi
- Time zone: UTC+1 (CET)
  - Summer (DST): UTC+2 (CEST)
- Postal code: 19010
- Dialing code: 0187
- Website: Official website

Maissana (Ligurian: Maissann-a) is a comune (municipality) in the Province of La Spezia in the Italian region Liguria, located about 50 kilometres (31 mi) east of Genoa and about 35 kilometres (22 mi) northwest of La Spezia.

This is also the coldest village in the province, with average winter temperatures ranging from a minimum of −5 °C (23 °F) to a maximum of 4 °C (39 °F). Snowfalls are frequent and heavy. In February 2009, in just one night 65 centimetres (26 in) of fresh snow has fallen.

Maissana borders the following municipalities: Carro, Casarza Ligure, Castiglione Chiavarese, Ne, Varese Ligure.
