= Moneglia =

Moneglia Moneggia (Ligurian)
- Comune
- Comune di Moneglia
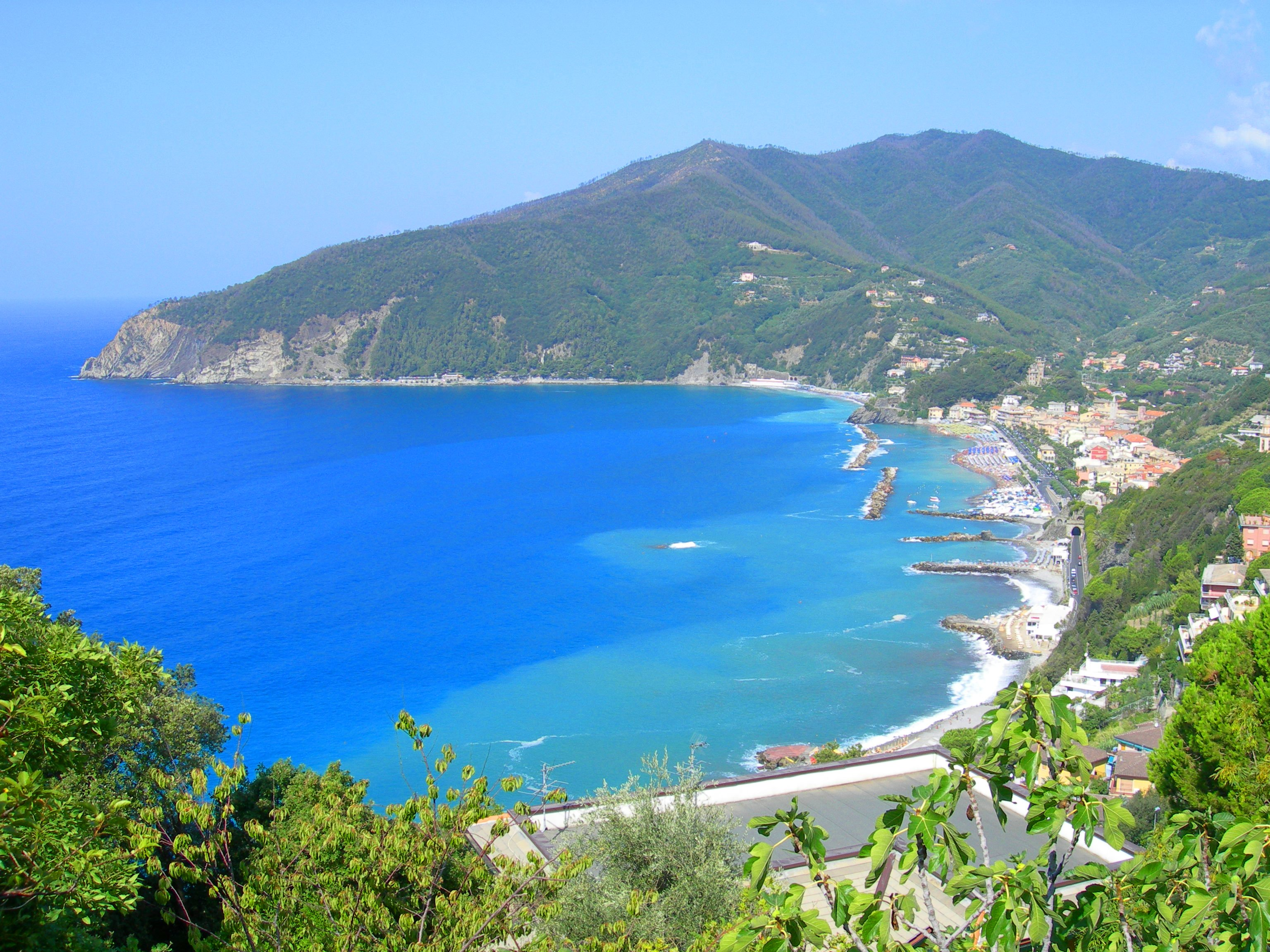

- Coat of arms

- Location within Italy Location within Liguria
- Coordinates: 44°14′N 9°29′E
- Country: Italy
- Region: Liguria
- Metropolitan city: Genoa (GE)
- Frazioni: Bracco, Casale, Camposoprano, Comeglio, Crova, Facciù, Lemeglio, Littorno, San Lorenzo, San Saturnino, Tessi

Government
  - Mayor: Claudio Magro

Area
  - Total: 15.4 km^{2} (5.9 sq mi)
- Elevation: 4 m (13 ft)

Population (31 October 2017)
  - Total: 2,794
  - Density: 181/km^{2} (470/sq mi)
- Demonym: Monegliesi
- Time zone: UTC+1 (CET)
  - Summer (DST): UTC+2 (CEST)
- Postal code: 16030
- Dialing code: 0185
- Saint day: 14 September
- Website: Official website

Moneglia (Italian: [moˈneʎʎa]; Ligurian: Moneggia [muˈnedʒa]) is a comune (municipality) in the Metropolitan City of Genoa in the Italian region Liguria, located about 50 kilometres (31 miles) southeast of Genoa. It is a tourist resort on the Riviera di Levante. It is one of I Borghi più belli d'Italia ("The most beautiful villages of Italy").

== Geography ==
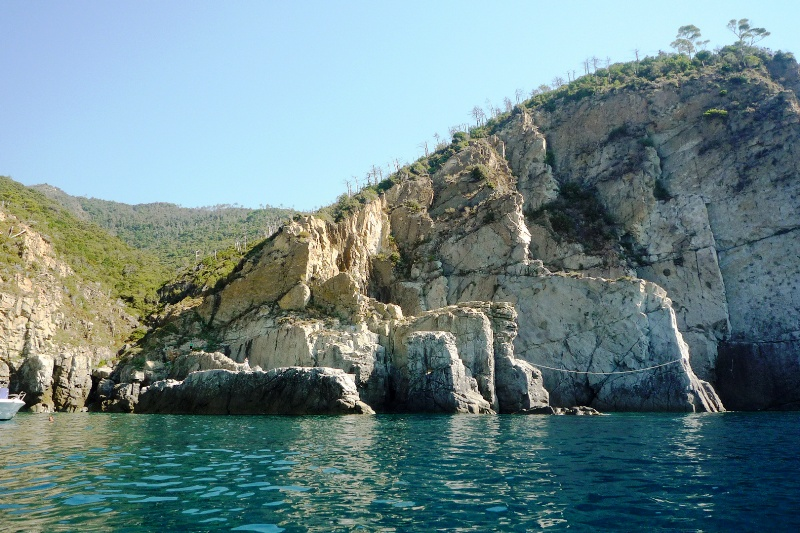
The rocky coast of Moneglia

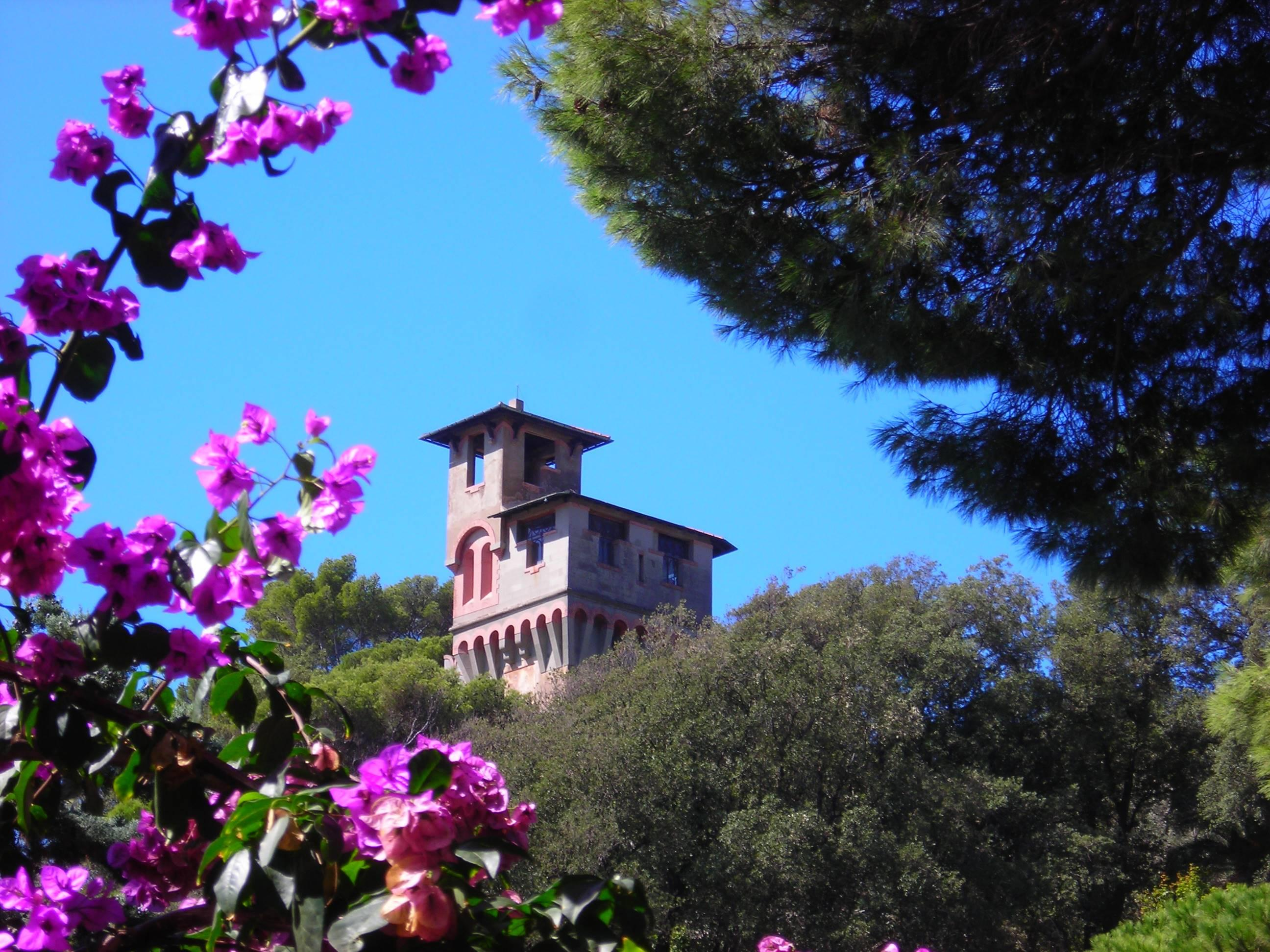
De Fornari Castle

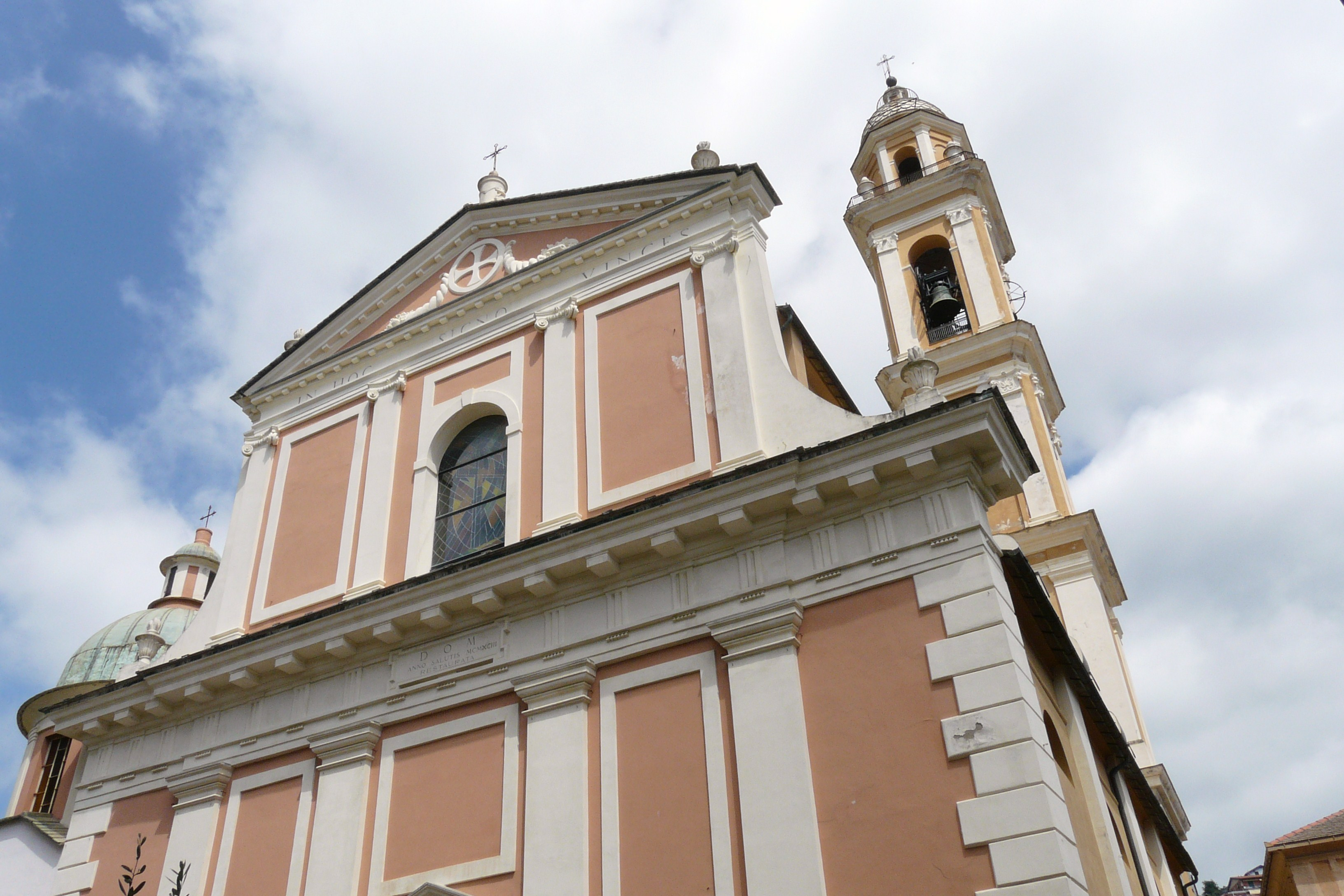
The church of Santa Croce

=== Topography ===
The village is placed on the eastern Ligurian Riviera, at the mouth of Petronio valley, about 56 kilometres (35 miles) east of Genoa, which is the last town of the province.

The village is located inside a large bay bounded by two capes, both rich in Mediterranean vegetation: Punta Moneglia in the west and Punta Rospo in the east. While the first is completely wild and accessible only by trail, the second has several residential areas to the village of Lemeglio.

The municipality includes, in addition to the main village, the frazioni of Bracco, Casale, Camposoprano, Comeglio, Crova, Facciù, Lemeglio, Littorno, San Lorenzo, San Saturnino and Tessi.

It is bordered to the north by the municipality of Castiglione Chiavarese, to the south is washed by the Ligurian Sea, to the west by the municipality of Casarza Ligure and Sestri Levante and to the east by municipality of Deiva Marina, in the province of La Spezia.

=== Climate ===
Moneglia has a Mediterranean climate. The Climatic Classification is "zone D, 1547 GR/G". The summers are quite hot during the day and fresh in the night. The winters are usually quite warm and the temperature rarely goes below zero.

== Main sights ==
- Church of San Giorgio, built in 1396 by Benedictine monks, who were replaced by Franciscans in 1494. The interior houses a wooden sculpture by Anton Maria Maragliano, a canvas of St. George Killing the Dragon attributed to Peter Paul Rubens, a Madonna with Saints by Carlo Dolci and an Adoration of the Magi by Luca Cambiaso. It has also a cloister.
- Church of Santa Croce, built, according to some sources, in 1130, but probably pre-existing. The modern church, in Baroque style, dates to 1725, and houses a statue of Madonna by Maragliano and a Byzantine Crucifix.
- Oratory of the Disciplinanti, known from the 10th century. It houses frescoes of stories of the Madonna and Jesus.
- Villafranca Tower, built by the Republic of Genoa around 1130, but later rebuilt during the struggle between the Genoese and the Malaspina family.
- Monleone Fortress, constructed in 1173 by the Genoese. In 1174 it was besieged by Count Obizzo Malaspina. It houses now an Art Nouveau-style residence, dating to the early 20th century.

== Economy ==
=== Tourism ===
The most important economic resource is tourism. It has wide sandy beaches, many rocky beaches and a large number of small bays accessible only by sea. There are numerous nature trails in the hills around the town. The rocky coast is also home of several a climbing wall systems.

== History ==
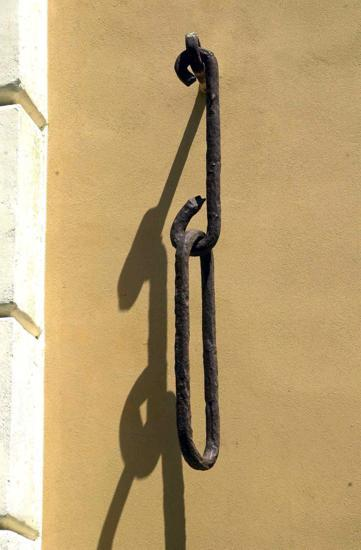
The port chains from Pisa

The village, already inhabited in pre-Roman times by Ligurians, became an important centre during the Roman Age thanks to its strategic position on Via Aurelia. In the 7th century AD Liguria was conquered by king Rothari and then by the Lombard king Liutprand who favoured the spread of the monasteries. Charlemagne gave the land and the port to the Monks Columban. In the Middle Ages Moneglia, along with other villages of eastern Liguria, was invaded by Saracen pirates who sacked it. The fief of Moneglia was ruled, until 1153, by the Fieschi from Lavagna, and subsequently became part of the Republic of Genoa. In 1284 Moneglia participated with its ships at the victorious Battle of Meloria, where Genoa won against the Republic of Pisa. According to the tradition Genoa donated to the community of Moneglia some pieces of the port of Pisa chain in exchange for their contribution to the victory. In the 16th century Moneglia was elected by Genoa as capital of the surrounding area. In 1815 Moneglia was incorporated in the Kingdom of Sardinia, after the Congress of Vienna; in 1861 it became part of the Kingdom of Italy.

== Culture ==
=== Cuisine ===
The main product of this land is Ligurian olive oil, which has obtained in recent years the PDO "Riviera Ligure di Levante". The cultivation of olive trees has allowed, over the past decades, the emergence of several mills where the production, especially a family, is now widespread. Moneglia oil goes well with fish dishes and Mediterranean diet, of which the Ligurian cuisine is perhaps the ultimate expression.

=== People ===
- Nicolò Caveri (also Canerio) who drew in 1502 a map of the "New world", discovered 10 years before by Christopher Columbus: the map is now held at Musee hydrographique de la Marine in Paris.
- Sandro Giacobbe (1951), Italian singer.
- Luca Cambiaso (1527–1585), artist.
- Giuseppe Domenico Botto (1791–1865), physicist.
- Gerolamo Bollo (1866–1931), admiral of the Italian Navy.
- On 29 September 2002 Gianluca Genoni, Italian diver, obtained in the waters of Moneglia the world record (132 m or 433 ft below sea level) in variable weight.

=== Main events ===
- "Carnevale della zucca", in February, a parade of carnival floats.
- "Festa delle Feste" at the end of February.
- Olive oil festival, on the Easter Monday.
- "Sagre" of San Saturnino, Bracco and Comeglio in summer.
- "Santa Croce" festival in the Santa Croce church in September.

== Transports ==
=== Roads ===
The village center of Moneglia is crossed by the main coastal road that allows the connection to the west with Sestri Levante via Riva Trigoso and to the east with Deiva Marina, in the province of La Spezia. The nearest motorway junctions are Sestri Levante and Deiva Marina on the Autostrada A12.

Further links are the provincial roads n° 55 "of Moneglia" and n° 68 "del Facciù", which are connected, on the hills behind the village, both to the north with the SS1 Aurelia.

=== National rail ===
Moneglia has a railway station on the railway line Genoa-La Spezia-Pisa. Convenient connections with Milan, Genoa, La Spezia, Cinque Terre and the others villages of Ligurian riviera.

== Twin towns ==
Moneglia is twinned with:

- Engen, Germany, since 2009
