= Varese Ligure =

Varese Ligure Vaise (Ligurian)
- Comune
- Comune di Varese Ligure
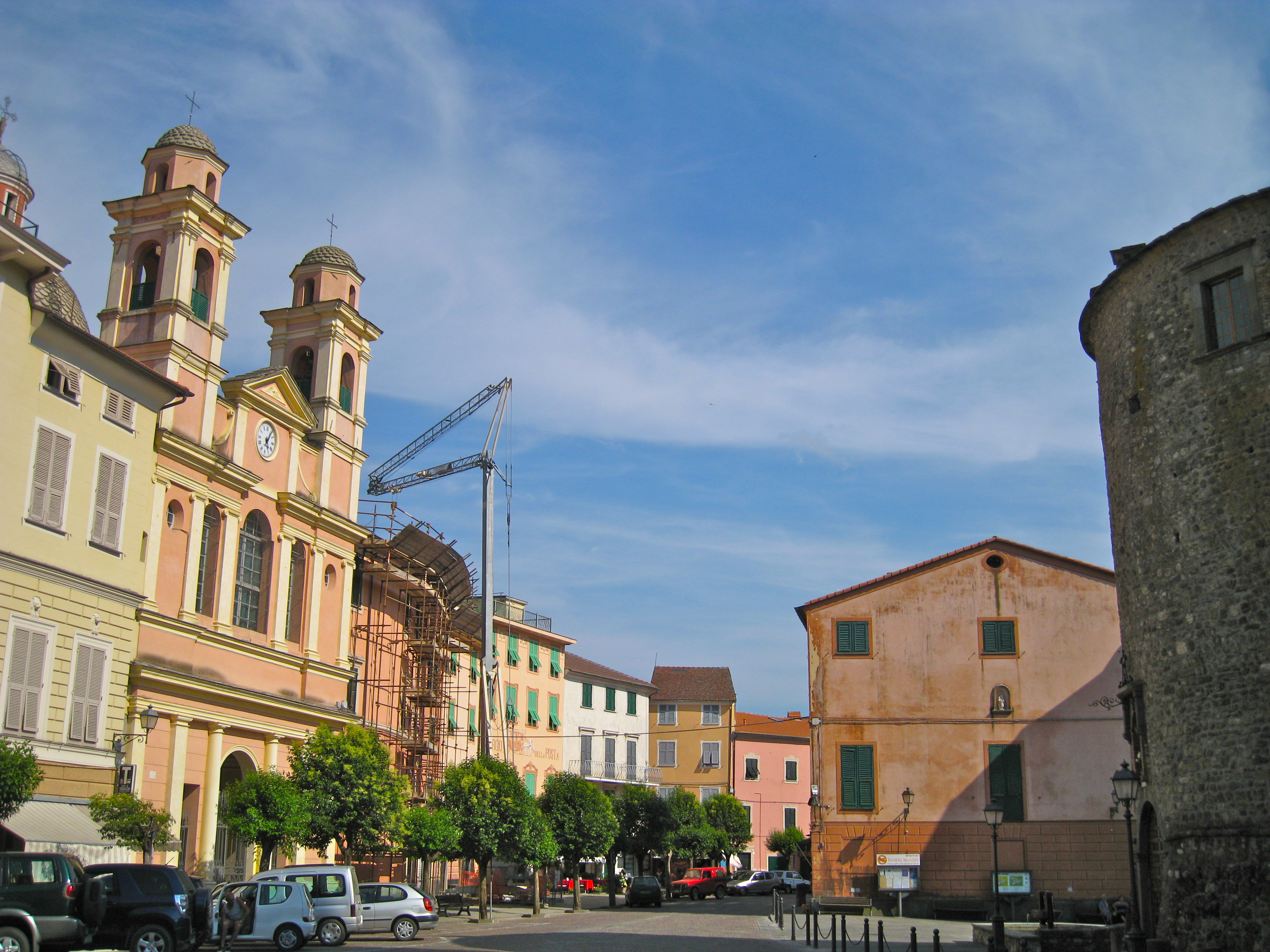

- Flag Coat of arms

- Location within Italy Location within Liguria
- Coordinates: 44°23′N 9°36′E
- Country: Italy
- Region: Liguria
- Province: La Spezia (SP)
- Frazioni: Buto, Caranza, Cassego, Cavizzano, Codivara, Comuneglia, Costola, Montale, Porciorasco, Salino, San Pietro Vara, Scurtabò, Teviggio, Taglieto, Valletti

Government
  - Mayor: Gian Carlo Lucchetti

Area
  - Total: 136.3 km^{2} (52.6 sq mi)
- Elevation: 353 m (1,158 ft)

Population (30 December 2015)
  - Total: 2,059
  - Density: 15.11/km^{2} (39.13/sq mi)
- Demonym: Varesini
- Time zone: UTC+1 (CET)
  - Summer (DST): UTC+2 (CEST)
- Postal code: 19028
- Dialing code: 0187
- Website: Official website

Varese Ligure (Ligurian: Vaise [ˈvajze]) is a comune (municipality) in the Province of La Spezia in the Italian region Liguria, located about 50 kilometres (31 mi) east of Genoa and about 35 kilometres (22 mi) northwest of La Spezia.

Varese Ligure borders the following municipalities: Albareto, Borzonasca, Carro, Maissana, Ne, Sesta Godano, Tornolo. It is one of I Borghi più belli d'Italia ("The most beautiful villages of Italy").
