= Giuseppe Domenico Botto =

Italian physicist (1791–1865)

Giuseppe Domenico Botto (4 April 1791 – 20 March 1865) was an Italian physicist.

Born at Moneglia, then in the Republic of Genoa. He studied at the University of Genoa and the École Polytechnique in Paris. The chair of General and Experimental Physics was assigned to G.D Botto in 1828. Experimental work was dedicated to magnetic, thermal, and chemical effects of electrical currents and induction of currents.

In 1830 Botto described in a note a prototype electric motor on which he was working and published a description of it in a Memoria titled "Machine Loco-motive mise en mouvement par l'électro-magnétisme" to the Academy of Turin around 1836.

A device built on the basis of his description was part of the collection of scientific instruments of the Grand Duke of Tuscany, which is now kept at the Institute and Museum of History of Science in Florence. In the following years he published more work on improving efficiency of electric motors.

Botto experimented with electrolysis of water using a manual generator of electric sparks, the electric magnet designed by Leopoldo Nobili and Vincenzo Antinori on the basis of the discovery of' electromagnetic induction made by Michael Faraday in 1831. In 1833 he tested an iron-platinum thermocouple wrapped as a chain around a wooden stick which generated a current when heat from a flame was applied. The heat from the flame created a temperature difference, and the thermocouple converted the temperature difference into an electric voltage.

He also worked on other subjects and published in 1846 a note for the improvement of agriculture in Piedmont. In 1849 he proposed a new system for transmission and encoding for the electrical telegraph system (notes on this subject were recently discovered in the archives of the Museo Sanguineti Leonardini of Chiavari).

He died at Turin in 1865.
