= Brugnato =

Brugnato Brugnæ
- Comune
- Comune di Brugnato
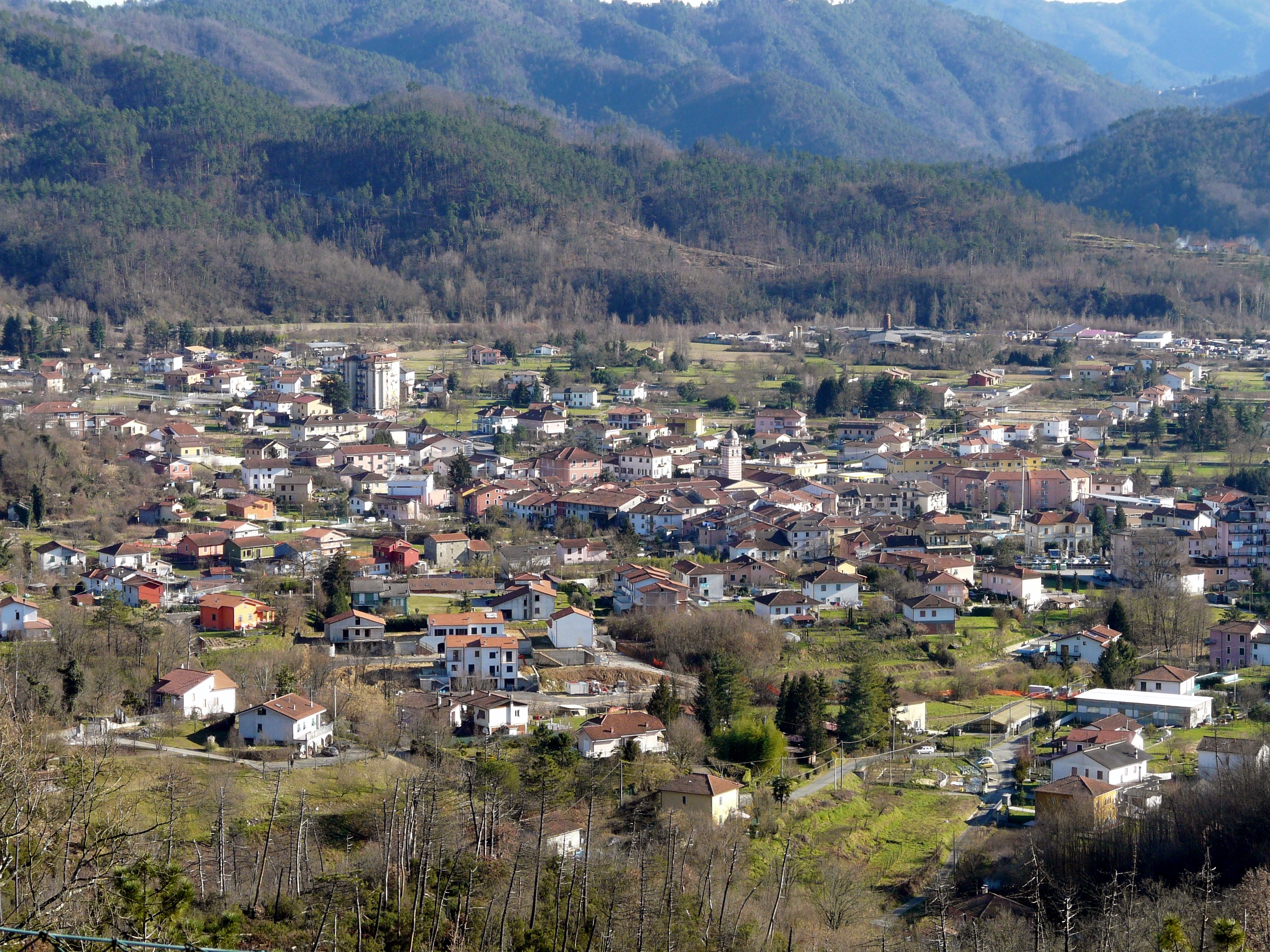
- Brugnato

- Coat of arms

- Location within Italy Location within Liguria
- Coordinates: 44°14′N 9°43′E
- Country: Italy
- Region: Liguria
- Province: Province of La Spezia (SP)
- Frazioni: Bozzolo

Government
  - Mayor: Claudio Galante (Lista Civica "Insieme per Brugnato" (Center-Right))

Area
  - Total: 12.0 km^{2} (4.6 sq mi)

Population (December 2010)
  - Total: 1,345
  - Density: 112/km^{2} (290/sq mi)
- Time zone: UTC+1 (CET)
  - Summer (DST): UTC+2 (CEST)
- Postal code: 19020
- Dialing code: 0187

Brugnato (Ligurian: Brugnæ) is a comune (municipality) in the Province of La Spezia in the Italian region Liguria, located about 70 kilometres (43 mi) southeast of Genoa and about 15 km (9.3 mi) northwest of La Spezia. As of 31 December 2004, it had a population of 1,205 and an area of 12.0 square kilometres (4.6 mi^{2}). It borders the following municipalities: Borghetto di Vara, Rocchetta di Vara, Sesta Godano, Zignago.

The foundation of Brugnato dates back to the 7th or 8th centuries and is linked to the erection of a monastery which, like other monastic sites in Liguria and northern Italy, was dependent on the abbey of St. Columbanus in Bobbio. In 1133, Brugnato became the see of a bishopric and the cathedral was built. On 25 November 1820, the diocese was amalgamated with that of Luni and Sarzana to form the new diocese of Luni, Sarzana e Brugnato, which in turn would become the Diocese of La Spezia, Sarzana e Brugnato, in 1975.

Brugnato has been chosen as one of the most beautiful villages in Italy and as such, it has been awarded the prestigious "Orange Flag" (Bandiera Arancione) by the Italian Touring Club since 2006. It is one of I Borghi più belli d'Italia ("The most beautiful villages of Italy").

== Demographic evolution ==
Historical population

| Year | Pop. | ±% |
|---|---|---|
| 1861 | 883 | — |
| 1871 | 994 | +12.6% |
| 1881 | 1,146 | +15.3% |
| 1901 | 1,106 | −3.5% |
| 1911 | 1,207 | +9.1% |

| Year | Pop. | ±% |
|---|---|---|
| 1921 | 1,182 | −2.1% |
| 1931 | 1,255 | +6.2% |
| 1936 | 1,191 | −5.1% |
| 1951 | 1,220 | +2.4% |
| 1961 | 1,003 | −17.8% |

| Year | Pop. | ±% |
|---|---|---|
| 1971 | 927 | −7.6% |
| 1981 | 1,030 | +11.1% |
| 1991 | 1,154 | +12.0% |
| 2001 | 1,191 | +3.2% |

Source: Data from ISTAT

== See also ==
- Diocese of Brugnato
