= Ne, Liguria =

Ne
- Comune
- Comune di Ne
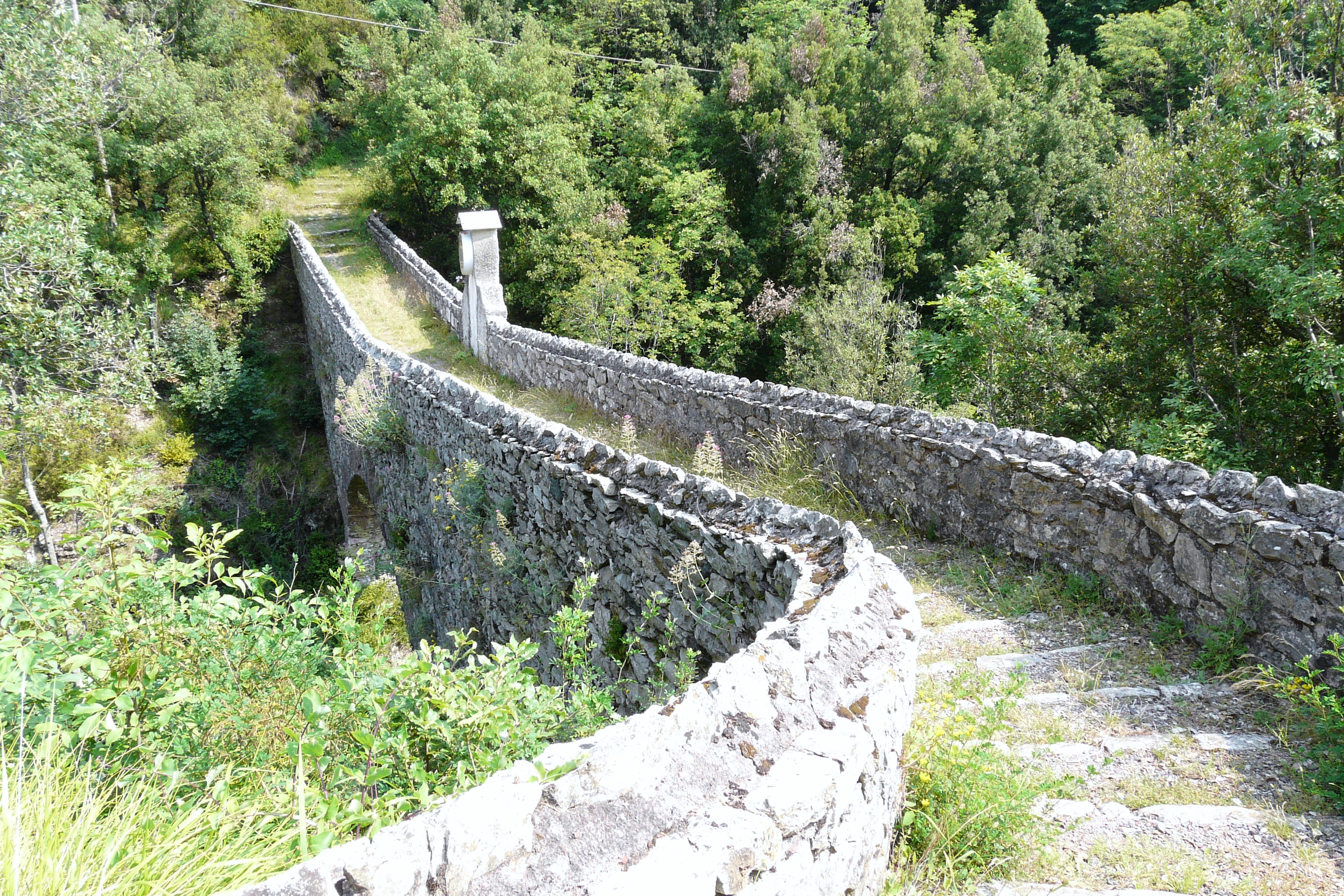
- Ancient bridge connecting the burghs of Nascio and Cassagna.

- Coat of arms

- Location within Italy Location within Liguria
- Coordinates: 44°21′N 9°24′E
- Country: Italy
- Region: Liguria
- Metropolitan city: Genoa (GE)
- Frazioni: Arzeno, Caminata, Castagnola, Chiesanuova, Conscenti (communal seat), Frisolino, Graveglia, Nascio, Ne, Piandifieno, Pontori, Reppia, Sambuceto, Santa Lucia, Statale, Zerli

Government
  - Mayor: Cesare Pesce

Area
  - Total: 64.1 km^{2} (24.7 sq mi)
- Elevation: 68 m (223 ft)

Population (30 November 2017)
  - Total: 2,228
  - Density: 34.8/km^{2} (90.0/sq mi)
- Demonym: Neesi
- Time zone: UTC+1 (CET)
  - Summer (DST): UTC+2 (CEST)
- Postal code: 16040
- Dialing code: 0185
- Patron saint: San Lorenzo
- Saint day: August 10
- Website: Official website

Ne (Italian pronunciation: [nɛ]) is a comune (municipality) in the Metropolitan City of Genoa in the Italian region Liguria, located in the Val Graveglia about 40 kilometres (25 mi) east of Genoa. It is formed by several distinct burghs, or frazioni.

== History ==
Ne stands for Nae, meaning "ship", and refers to the shape of Monte Zatta, the highest mountain of the area at an elevation of 1,404 metres (4,606 ft). It adjoins the valley of Graveglia, the ancient realm of Garibald, the king of the Lombards who fled from Lombardy in 673.

The family of the founder of the modern, united Italian state, Giuseppe Garibaldi, originated in the nearby valley of Graveglia. A monument to Garibaldi is located in Conscenti, one of Ne's 16 frazione, or hamlets, and the comune's seat of government. Most of these frazione originated as castles built during and after the tenth century as defenses against Saracen raids.

== Main sights ==
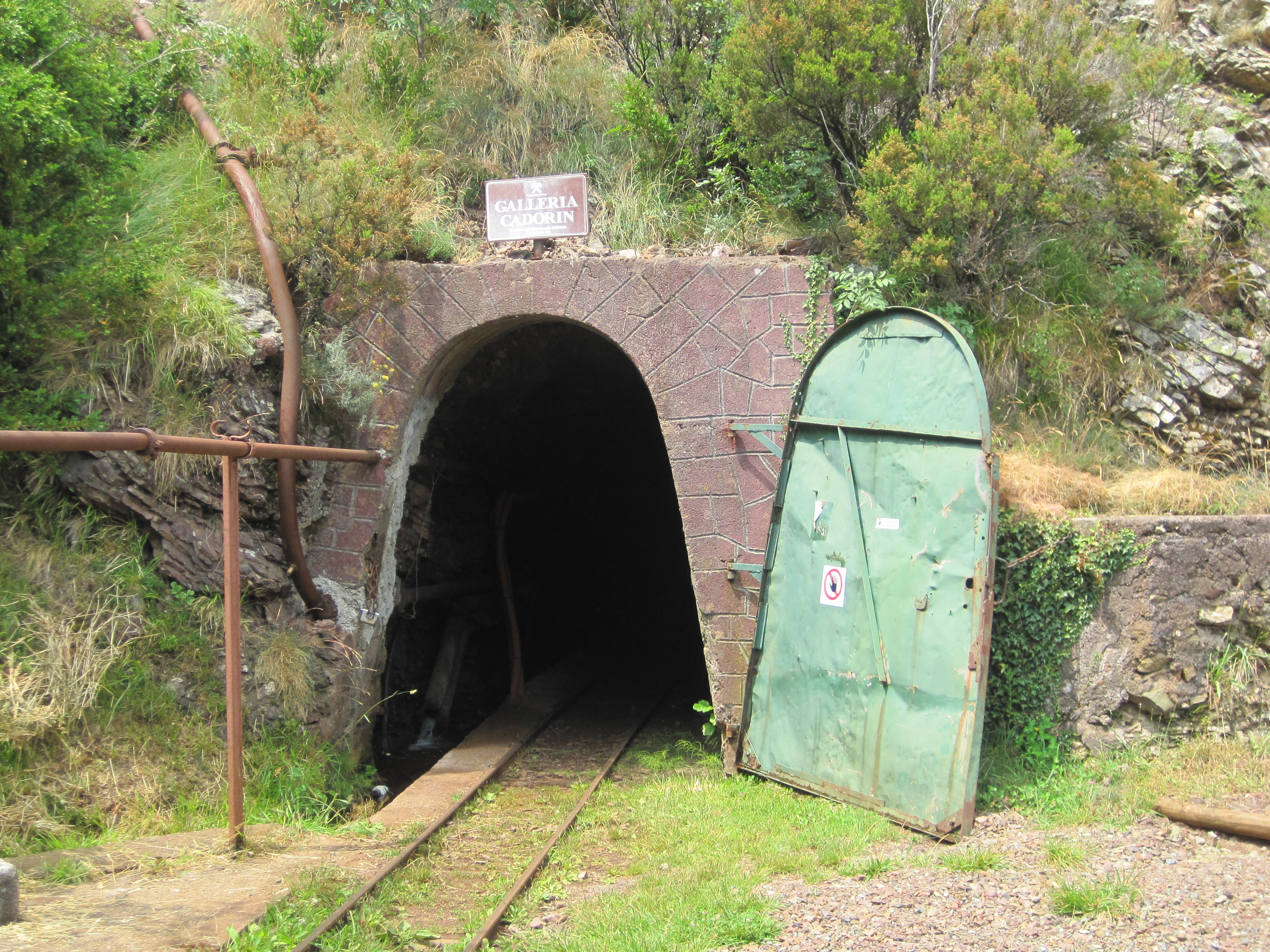
Gambatesa Mine

Ne's landscape is naturally partitioned by the bottom of the Graveglia valley, the Graveglia river, and the high pastures and woods.

Natural attractions include:

- Views of Mount Chiappozzo, Mount Porcile, and the Biscia Pass.
- The thousand-year-old oak tree of Gosita, in the frazione Zerli.
- A network of high-altitude paths, pedestrian and carriage roads for trekking and mountain biking, which afford striking views of the southern part of the Aveto Natural Regional Park.
- The caves of Tana di Cà Freghé.
- Geological formations known as "the pillows".
- The Gambatesa Mine, the largest manganese mine in Europe, which is visitable via tram.

Other attractions include:

- Traces of pre-Roman settlements at Statale.
- Cassagna, a medieval stone village reachable on foot through the Ponte Cambiaso, a bridge built in 1766 on top of a 50-metre (160 ft) precipice.
