= Zeri =

Zeri Zéri
- Comune
- Comune di Zeri
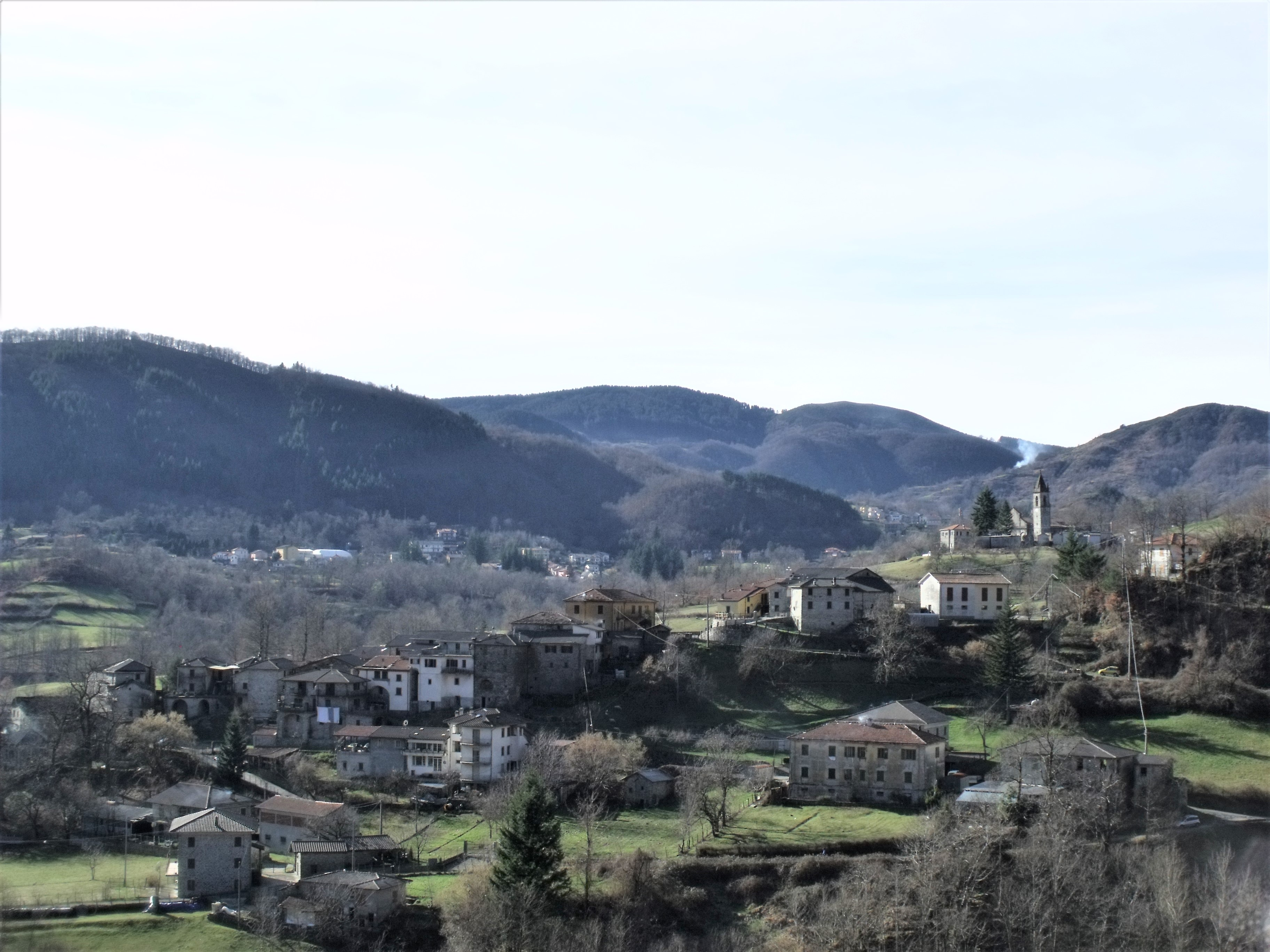

- Coat of arms

- Location within Italy Location within Tuscany
- Coordinates: 44°21′N 09°46′E
- Country: Italy
- Region: Tuscany
- Province: Massa and Carrara (MS)
- Frazioni: Adelano, Antara, Bosco di Rossano, Bergugliara, Castello, Codolo, Coloretta, Ferdana, Fichi, La Dolce, Noce, Paretola, Patigno, Rossano, Serralunga, Valditermine, Villaggio Aracci, Villaggio Passo del Rastrello

Government
  - Mayor: Cristian Petacchi

Area
  - Total: 73.66 km^{2} (28.44 sq mi)
- Elevation: 708 m (2,323 ft)

Population (31 October 2021)
  - Total: 978
  - Density: 13.3/km^{2} (34.4/sq mi)
- Demonym: Zeraschi
- Time zone: UTC+1 (CET)
  - Summer (DST): UTC+2 (CEST)
- Postal code: 54029
- Dialing code: 0187
- Website: Official website

Zeri (Emilian: Zéri) is a comune in the province of Massa and Carrara, Tuscany, central Italy. It is located in the Lunigiana traditional region.
