= Deiva Marina =

- Comune
- Comune di Deiva Marina
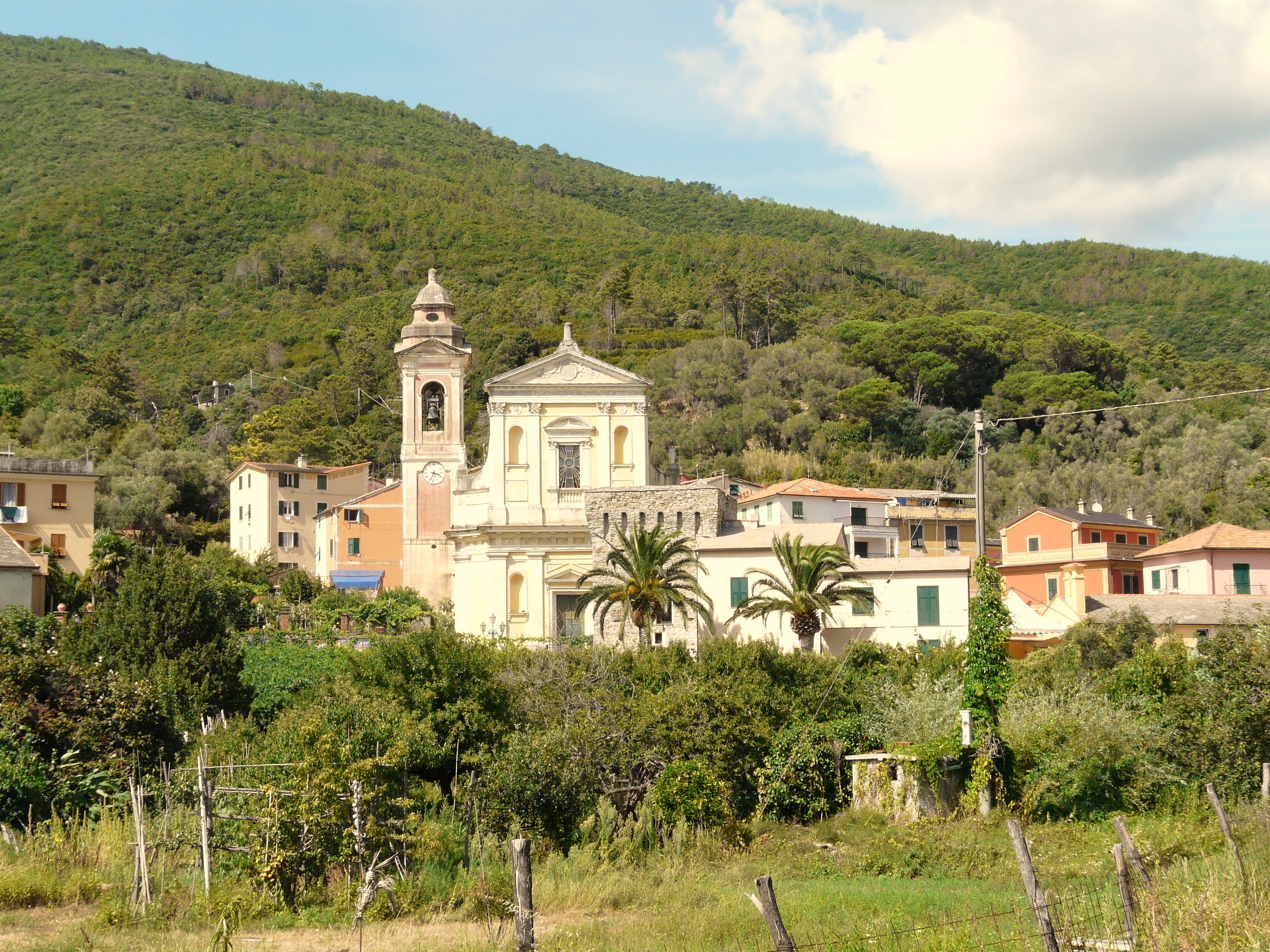
- Deiva Marina (historic center)

- Coat of arms

- Location within Italy Location within Liguria
- Coordinates: 44°13′N 9°31′E
- Country: Italy
- Region: Liguria
- Province: Province of La Spezia (SP)
- Frazioni: Mezzema, Mulino, Miniera, Colle, Piazza, Ca' Mirò

Government
  - Mayor: Gianluigi Troiano

Area
  - Total: 14 km^{2} (5.4 sq mi)
- Elevation: 18 m (59 ft)

Population (30 June 2017)
  - Total: 1,359
  - Density: 97/km^{2} (250/sq mi)
- Demonym: Deivesi
- Time zone: UTC+1 (CET)
  - Summer (DST): UTC+2 (CEST)
- Postal code: 19013
- Dialing code: 0187
- Patron saint: Sant'Antonio abate
- Saint day: 17 January
- Website: Official website

Deiva Marina is a small Italian comune in the province of La Spezia (region of Liguria), located about 65 kilometres (40 mi) east of the city of Genoa on the Riviera di Levante. It is one of I Borghi più belli d'Italia ("The most beautiful villages of Italy").

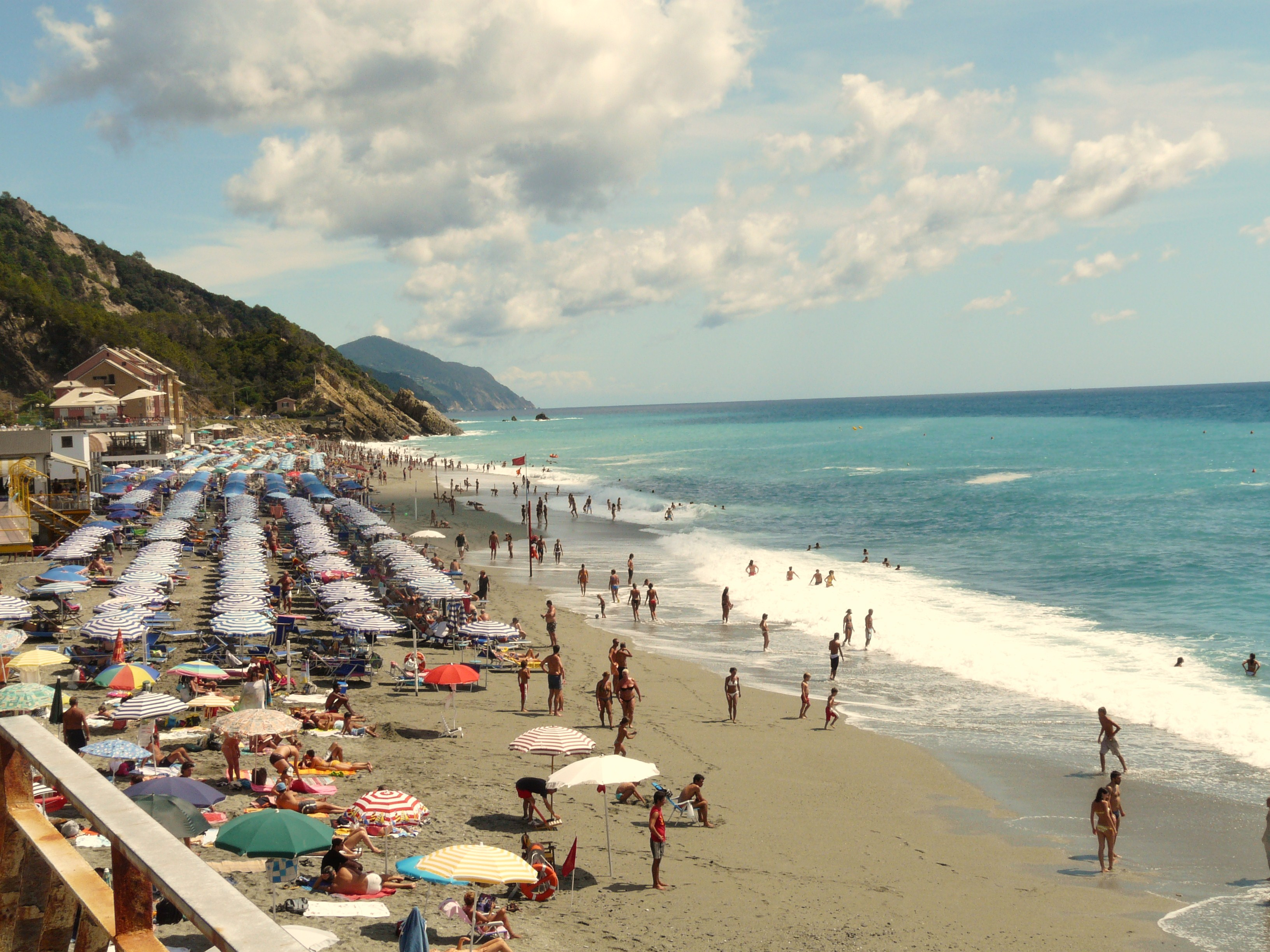
Deiva Marina seashore in summer.

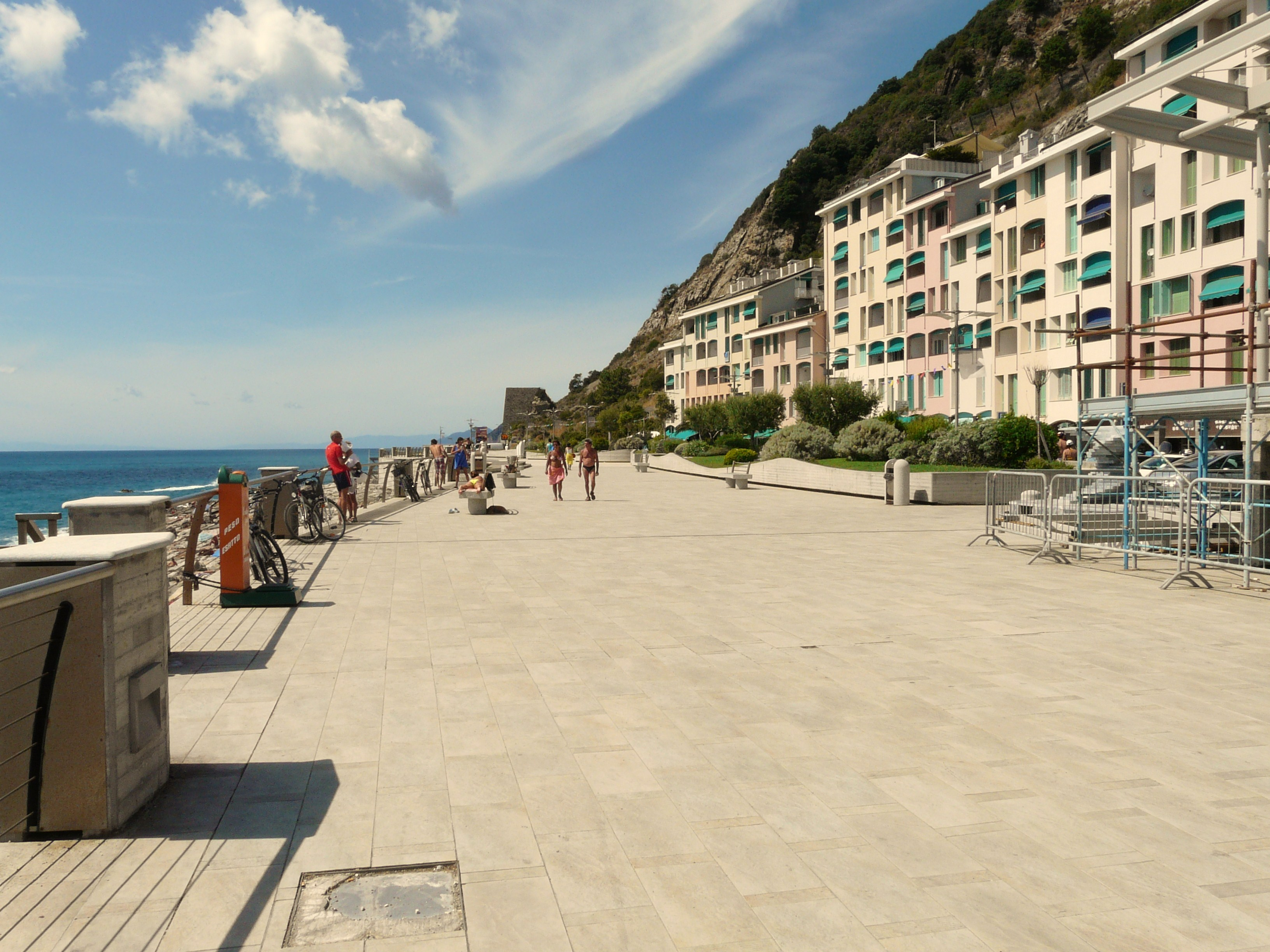
Deiva Marina seafront (western side).

It is a quiet touristic resort, with clean seawater and a seashore surrounded by green mountains. It is known as a fishing place all year long.

Excursions to nearby Cinque Terre National Park, which is a UNESCO World Heritage Site, or to Portofino are very easy by train.

Since 2018 Deiva Marina municipality is a partner of the Pelagos Sanctuary for Mediterranean Marine Mammals. This implies a commitment to intensify the fight against any form of pollution, whether of maritime or land-based origin having or likely to have a direct or indirect impact on the marine mammal conservation status as well as to avoid any highspeed motorboat competition.

== History ==
Although mentioned in documents since Carolingian period, the territory was hard to reach by land because of the high mountains surrounding it and by sea, because of the lack of a harbour. A number of small villages scattered the inland, while the seafront could not be inhabited because of the incursions of Muslim Barbary pirates. Local people were often fishermen, but at night would retreat inland to the historic center of Deiva near the church. Two watch towers, built in the 16th century, were the only fortifications, where the population could hide, and today are in the coat of arms of the municipality. The square tower, near the church, about one kilometer from the sea, has been preserved and restored. The round one, near the sea, was partially demolished by a flash flood in 1852.

In 1874 the railway along the Ligurian coast was completed and Deiva became easier to access: a few houses were built near the railway station, including an inn called "Albergo Savoia". The rest of the coastal area was partially used by a factory and later also for military defense. The only remarkable building built near the seashore in the first half of the 20th century was "Villa Schiaffino", a villa in the Art Nouveau style.

The transformation of Deiva into a holiday resort became possible only in 1932, when the railways (including the railway station) were moved about 1 km inland, leaving a wide usable seafront, but really took place after World War II. Meanwhile, connection to the main Italian towns was greatly improved both by the construction of the motorway A12 and by the reuse of abandoned railway tunnels for local car traffic. This encouraged in the Sixties and Seventies the construction of many apartment buildings, to be used as second houses.

== Economy ==
The most important economic resource is tourism.

=== Tourism ===
Deiva Marina offers its visitors a variety of sea and land attractions. It has wide sandy beaches, many rocky beaches and a large number of small bays accessible only by sea. Fishing is productive all year long. Moreover cruises for fishing or whale watching are possible.

There are many nature trails in the hills surrounding Deiva Marina. The two trails leading to the nearby places of Framura and Moneglia develop parallel to the coast line among the maquis shrubland, vineyard terraces or chestnut or maritime pine woods and provide interesting viewpoints on the sea. Other trail lead inland, climbing the local Apennine mountains. Real climbing can be experienced on the Falesia della Sfinge.

== Transportation ==
It can be reached:

- by train from Genova or La Spezia.
- by car the nearest motorway junction is indicated as "Deiva Marina" on the Autostrada A12. It is also convenient to exit at Sestri Levante and reach Deiva following the coast through Riva Trigoso and Moneglia. Most of this road takes advantage of one-way tunnels, where direction of traffic is alternated every 20 minutes.
- by plane the nearest airports are Genoa (GOA) at 59 km; Pisa (PSA) at 92 km; Parma (PMF) at 90 km and Milan (LIN) at 136 km.

Train is also very convenient for exploring the nearby famous resorts as Cinque Terre (15 minutes) or Portofino (30 minutes). The marina of Lavagna is also close.

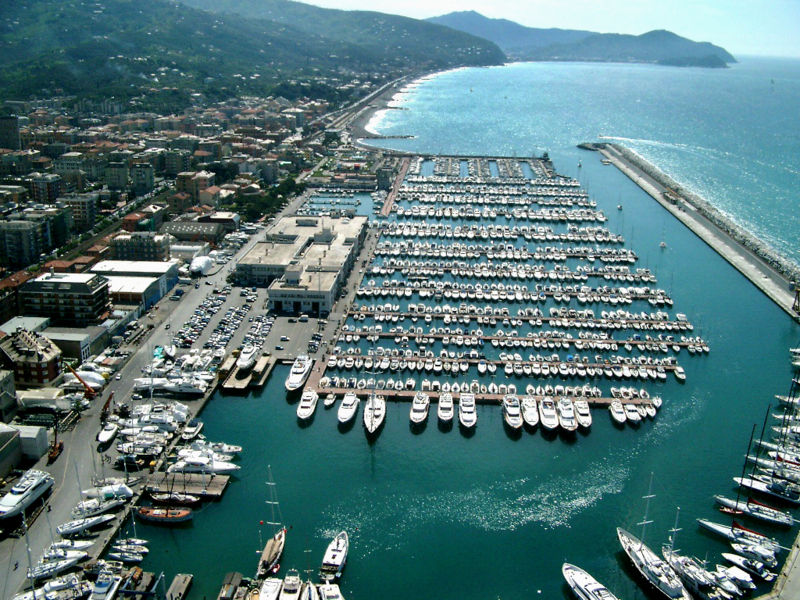
The nearby marina of Lavagna
