= Surnames of Russian Orthodox clergy =

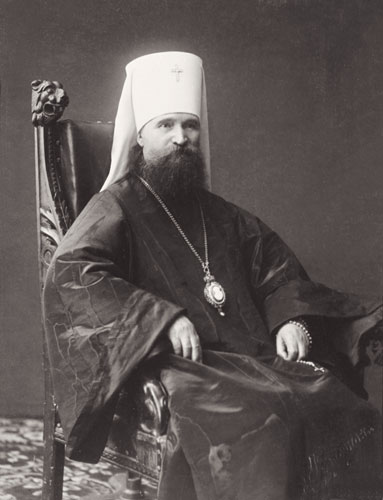
Vladimir Bogoyavlensky; the surname is derived from "явление Бога", 'manifestation of God', i.e., from the holiday of Epiphany

Surnames of Russian Orthodox clergy, variously called семинаристские фамилии, семинарские фамилии, фамилии церковного происхождения, поповские фамилии, etc. (seminarist surnames, seminarian surnames, families of church origin, priestly surnames, etc.) are a category of Russian artificial surnames acquired by Russian Orthodox clergy. This practice originated in Russian Empire in the end of the 17th century and continued for two centuries. Most often surnames of this type were given to students of theological schools (seminary, bursa, theological academy, etc.) by school heads, commonly to the students of lower social strata who did not have surnames or had "unpleasant", "cacophonic" surnames, inappropriate for their future spiritual occupations.

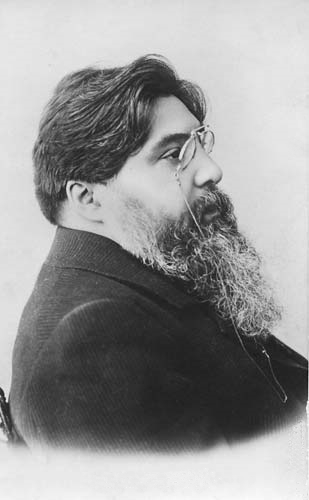
Alexander Amfiteatrov

Boris Unbegaun noted the limitless inventiveness in creation of these surnames. Still, in his book on Russian surnames, he identified several typical categories: according to birthplaces (Krasnopolsky for Krasnoye Pole), from the names and epithets of saints (Kosminsky), local churches and church holidays, from Biblical and church traditions. They could have lexical elements from Church Slavonic, Greek and Latin language, as well as from Classic Latin and Greek tradition (Troyansky, after Troy), and even ordinary nouns of Greek or Latin root (Amfiteatrov). They could originate from the nature: plants, animals, precious minerals, and natural phenomena and concepts (Severov from sever, 'north'). Finally, they may derive from the names of prominent foreigners (Miltonov, after John Milton) or locations (Sorbonsky, after the Sorbonne).

Since the Russian Orthodox clergy can marry, these surnames gradually propagated via the children outside clergy over all Russia.

== See also ==
- Religious name
- Eastern Slavic naming customs
