= Amfiteatrof Music Festival =

- Genre: Classical; chamber music; musical theatre
- Dates: June/July - September
- Locations: Levanto, Bonassola, Framura, Brugnato and other ligurian Comuni in the Province of La Spezia, Italy
- Years active: 1992 - present
- Organizer: Associazione Massimo Amfiteatrof Levanto
- Website: www.festivalamfiteatrof.com

Amfiteatrof Music Festival (previously known as Festival Massimo Amfiteatrof) is a classical and chamber music festival based in Levanto, an Italian Comune in the Ligurian Riviera, between Genoa and La Spezia, since 1992.

The festival pays tribute to Massimo Amfiteatrof (born Maksim Aleksandrovich Amfiteatrov), considered one of the greatest cellists of the 20th century, dubbed as the "Cellists' Caruso" (Italian: "il Caruso dei Violoncellisti"). He moved from St. Petersburg to Italy in the early 1920s, settling first in Cavi, a frazione of Lavagna, and then in Levanto, where he died in 1990. During his lifetime, Amfiteatrof worked with Arturo Toscanini, Fabrizio De André and collaborated with EIAR and subsequently with RAI.

The Festival has been organized by Associazione Festival Massimo Amfiteatrof Levanto since its beginning and the administrative board is currently led by president Angela Fenwick.

== The Festival ==
Founded two years after Amfiteatrof's death, Amfiteatrof Music Festival offers every summer, from July to September, a considerable number of concerts and music performances. The festival is well known for the architectonic, historic and geographic hallmarks of the sites where they are held: old churches, castles, noble houses, small scenic squares (the so-called "piazzettes"), old towns and convents, gardens, parks and amazing heights and cliffs overlooking the Ligurian Sea. Partly due to these features, a large number of tourists, including foreigners, regularly attend the concerts during the summer season in the Levanto area, near to the Cinque Terre towns.

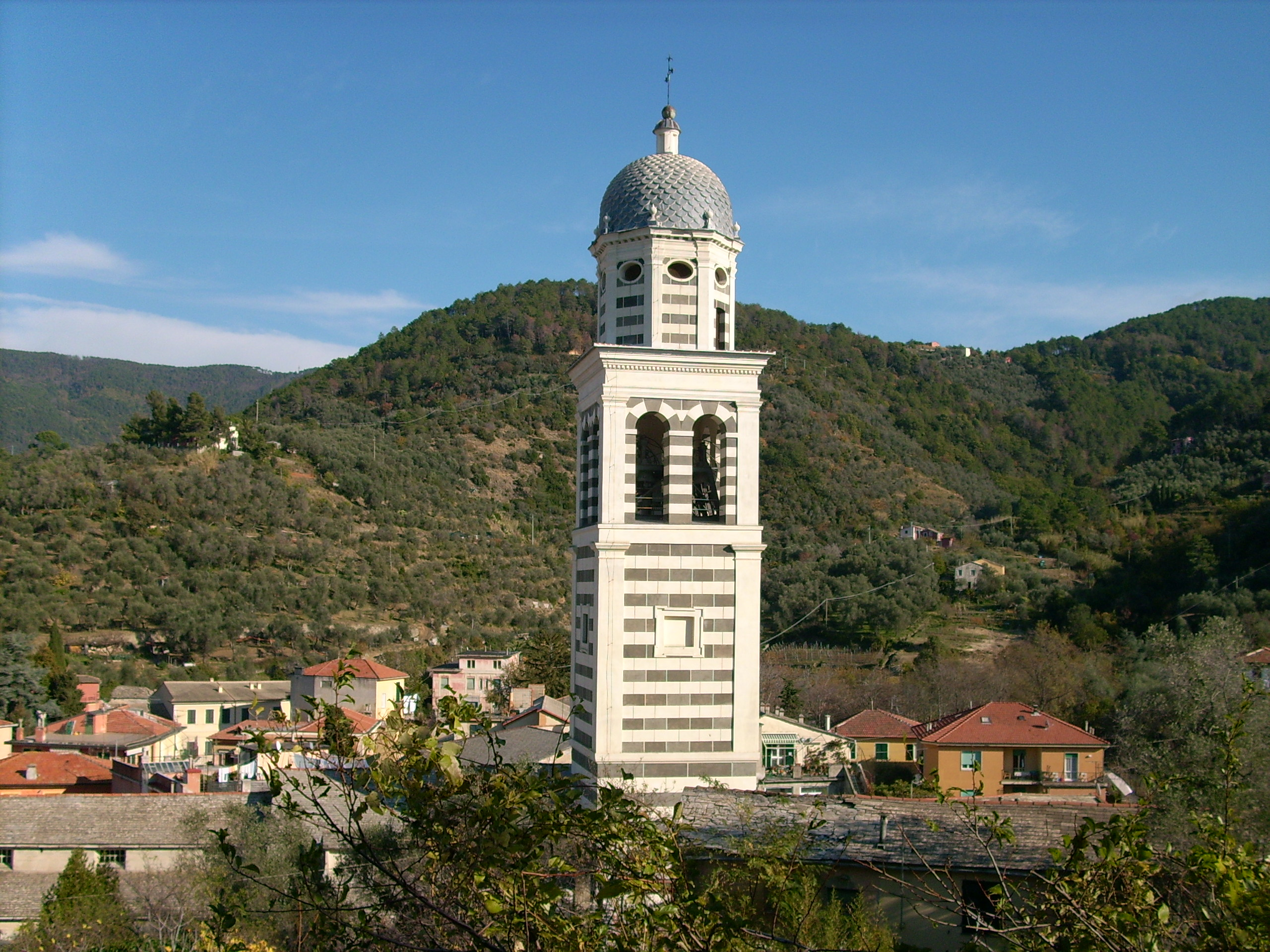
Bell tower of St. Andrew's Church (Chiesa di S. Andrea) in Levanto, the main location of the Festival.

All the concerts are free entry with the exception of those requiring an early reservation, such as premieres, debuts, theatre shows and very famous musicians' recitals, often located in prestigious sites (for example, the gardens of Villa Agnelli in Levanto, which belonged to Gianni Agnelli).

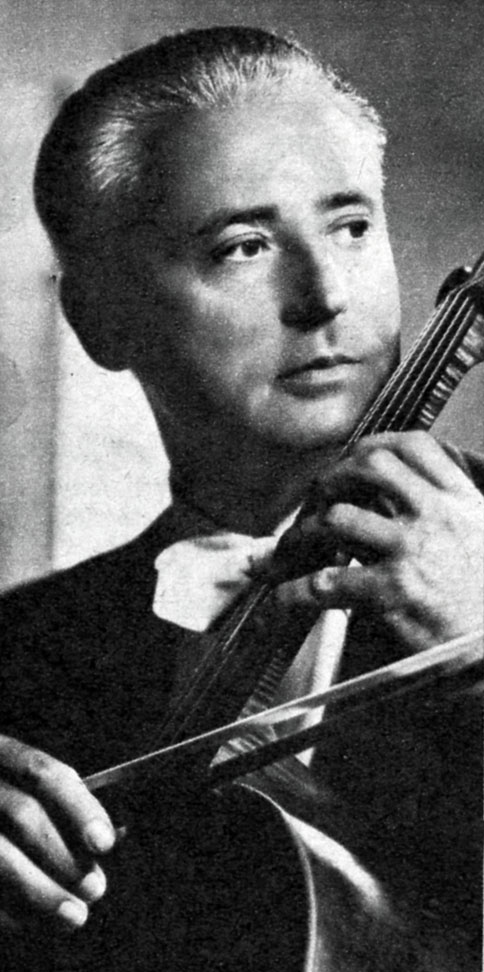
The Festival is dedicated to Massimo Amfiteatrof, known as the "Cellists' Caruso"

Amfiteatrof Music Festival features classical and chamber music performances by many internationally renowned soloists and ensembles. Formative and didactic workshops, cultural lectures, children theatre and contemporary experimental performances, which blend music with other arts, also make the event. Many musicians and orchestra conductors collaborated with Amfiteatrof during his lifetime or were tied with him from caring relationships and that's one of the main reasons why they frequently come back in Levanto to perform again. During the early years the major place of the Festival was the Convento della Santissima Annunziata in Levanto. Later on, it has been moved to the outside yard of St. Andrew's Church (Chiesa di Sant'Andrea). Nowadays there are more locations than before - both internal and external ones - in Levanto, but also in the nearby villages of the Province of La Spezia, such as Framura, Bonassola (on the Riviera) and Brugnato (within the inner Province)

== Artists and performers ==
Popular and recurrent performers of the Festival are: Camerata RCO (soloists of the Royal Concertgebouw Orchestra), ensemble-in-residence from 2009 to 2015, Dynamis Ensemble, Elena Denisova, Moni Ovadia, Alexander Lonquich, the chamber musicians of Maggio Musicale Fiorentino, Palo Alto Chamber Orchestra, Andrea Bacchetti, Mariangela Vacatello, Domenico Nordio, Bruno Canino - Antonio Ballista piano duo and many other popular artists

== Main locations ==
Amfiteatrof Music Festival locations are in Levanto and in the nearby Comuni.

- in Levanto: St. Andrew's Church (Chiesa di Sant'Andrea), St. Jack's Oratory (Oratorio di San Giacomo), Clarisse's Convent (Convento delle Clarisse), the gardens outside Villa Agnelli, Piazzetta della Loggia, Piazzetta della Compera, Convento della Santissima Annunziata and frazioni of Montale and Chiesanuova
- in Bonassola: St. Catherine of Alexandria's Church (Chiesa di Santa Caterina d'Alessandria), St. Erasmus's Oratory (Oratorio di Sant'Erasmo)
- in Framura: St. Martin's Church (Chiesa di San Martino) in the frazione of Costa.

Amfiteatrof Music Festival concerts or musical events also take place in the pedestrian paths and in the cliffs upon the Ligurian Sea, near to the aforementioned Comuni.

== See also ==
- Massimo Amfiteatrof
- Levanto
- Liguria
