= Amfiteatrov =

Amfiteatrov, feminine: Amfiteatrova is a Russian surname originated in clergy, derived from the word amphitheatre. Notable people with the surname include:

- Alexander Amfiteatrov
- Daniele Amfitheatrof (1901 – 1983), Russian-Italian composer and conductor
- Filaret Amfiteatrov (1779–1858), bishop of the Russian Orthodox Church, Metropolitan of Kiev and Galicia
- Francesca Amfitheatrof, jewelry designer
- Massimo Amfiteatrof (Maksim Amfiteatrov)
