= Operations Ginny I and II =

Failed sabotage missions during World War II

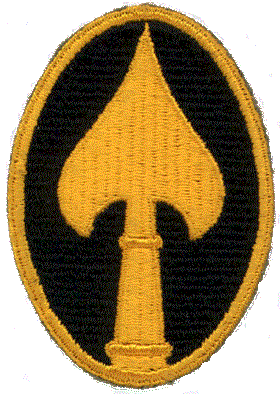
- OSS Shoulder Insignia
Date	February 27 – March 26, 1944
Location	Ligurian coast
Result	Mission failure

Belligerents
United States	Germany; Italian Social Republic

Commanders and leaders
(United States) Vincent Russo	(Nazi Germany) Anton Dostler

Strength
15	Unknown

Casualties and losses
All executed	none

Operations Ginny I and II were two ill-fated sabotage missions conducted by the U.S. Office of Strategic Services (OSS) in 1944 during the Italian campaign of World War II. Their aim was to blow up railway tunnels that would cut the line of communication to German forces in central Italy. The first mission, Ginny I, occurred on February 27/28, 1944, when fifteen U.S. soldiers attempted to land west of the small town of Framura. However, the OSS team had to abort after they landed on the wrong spot and could not find the tunnel. The second attempt, Ginny II, occurred a month later on March 22 when the same team attempted to land on the same spot. However, they landed again in the wrong place and were captured two days later by the German Army. Although the OSS members were properly uniformed, they were summarily executed on March 26 under Hitler's Commando Order of 1942 at the command of German General Anton Dostler. After the war, Dostler was tried by a military tribunal for the deaths of fifteen Americans, sentenced to death, and executed by a firing squad.

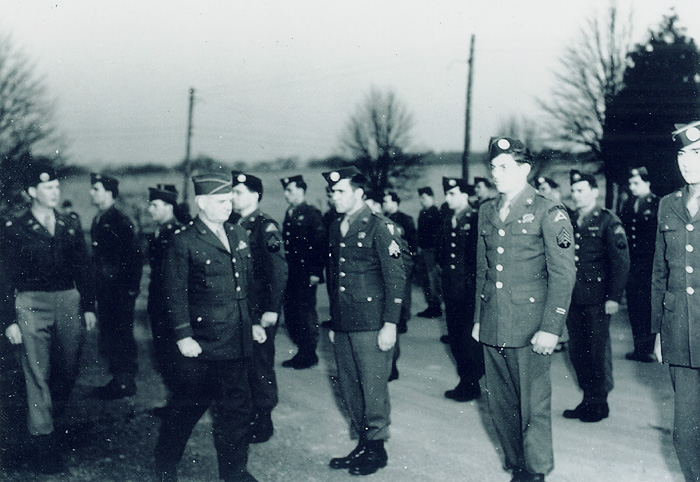
General William J. Donovan reviews the Operational Groups (OGs) at Area F, the Congressional Country Club in Bethesda, Maryland, prior to their departure for China.

== Background ==
The Office of Strategic Services (OSS) was formed in June 1942 by General William J. Donovan to collect and analyze strategic information required by the Joint Chiefs of Staff and to conduct special operations not assigned to other agencies. In the early days of the OSS, it initially lacked experience, resources, and the respect of skeptical staff officers in the theater. However, the OSS proved its value by establishing contacts with Allied sympathizers and gathered intelligence vital to the invasion prior to Operation Torch and organized warrior tribesmen into a guerrilla force to guard against a possible Axis thrust through Spanish Morocco into the Allied rear with bilingual U.S. officers during the North African Campaign. The OSS then established the Operational Group (OG) to recruit second generation American soldiers with language facility who, if organized in small groups and trained with commando capabilities, could be parachuted into enemy occupied territory to harass the enemy and to encourage and support local resistance organizations.

During the landings on the Italian mainland at Salerno in September 1943, an OSS detachment provided Lieutenant Colonel William O. Darby's Rangers with critical intelligence during their defense of the Sorrento Peninsula. Three weeks after the Italian government surrendered to the Allies on September 8, Allied Force Headquarters (AFHQ) issued a key directive, "OSS/SOE Activities in Italy," that the OG's mandate was: to undertake the commando-type actions—for which Donovan had been pinning. In this document, the OSS and SOE were given four tasks:

- Instigation of the Italian population to carry out acts of resistance to German forces.
- Direct attack on communications and transport in that area of Italy now held by the enemy. Old raiding parties will make the attacks and remain to instruct and incite the local population to further and similar efforts.
- Destruction of enemy aircraft on the ground.
- Destruction of enemy supply drops.

One of the OSS' most important tasks was to cut vital German supply lines that reinforced the Gustav and later the Gothic Line. After the USAAF bombing raids on mountainous terrain roads along the Italian coast during Operation Strangle failed in damaging the German supply lines, the OSS discussed the use of sabotage teams. On January 9, 1944, the OSS proposed the destruction of tunnels between Levanto and Bonassola, a segment in the Genoa-La Spezia rail line. The longest of these were the "La Francesca", 510 meters in length, at the northwestern end of the target sector; at the southeastern end, beginning 600 meters west of Levanto station, were two short tunnels, one 105 and the other 75 meters in length, separated by 25 meters of open track. The rocky walls of the tunnels were thought to consist chiefly of the serpentine type, making them less vulnerable to demolition. A captured Italian officer who had recently traveled over the line reported that there were few guards along the coast between Genoa and La Spezia. This gave the OSS an advantage and it was reported that "the tunnels are all single track: interruption of traffic would thus require blowing fewer tunnel entrances and permit achievement of greater results with the same weight of explosive." This meant that fewer teams and fewer explosives would have been required to sabotage and interrupt the rail traffic. The mission was given the code name Ginny.

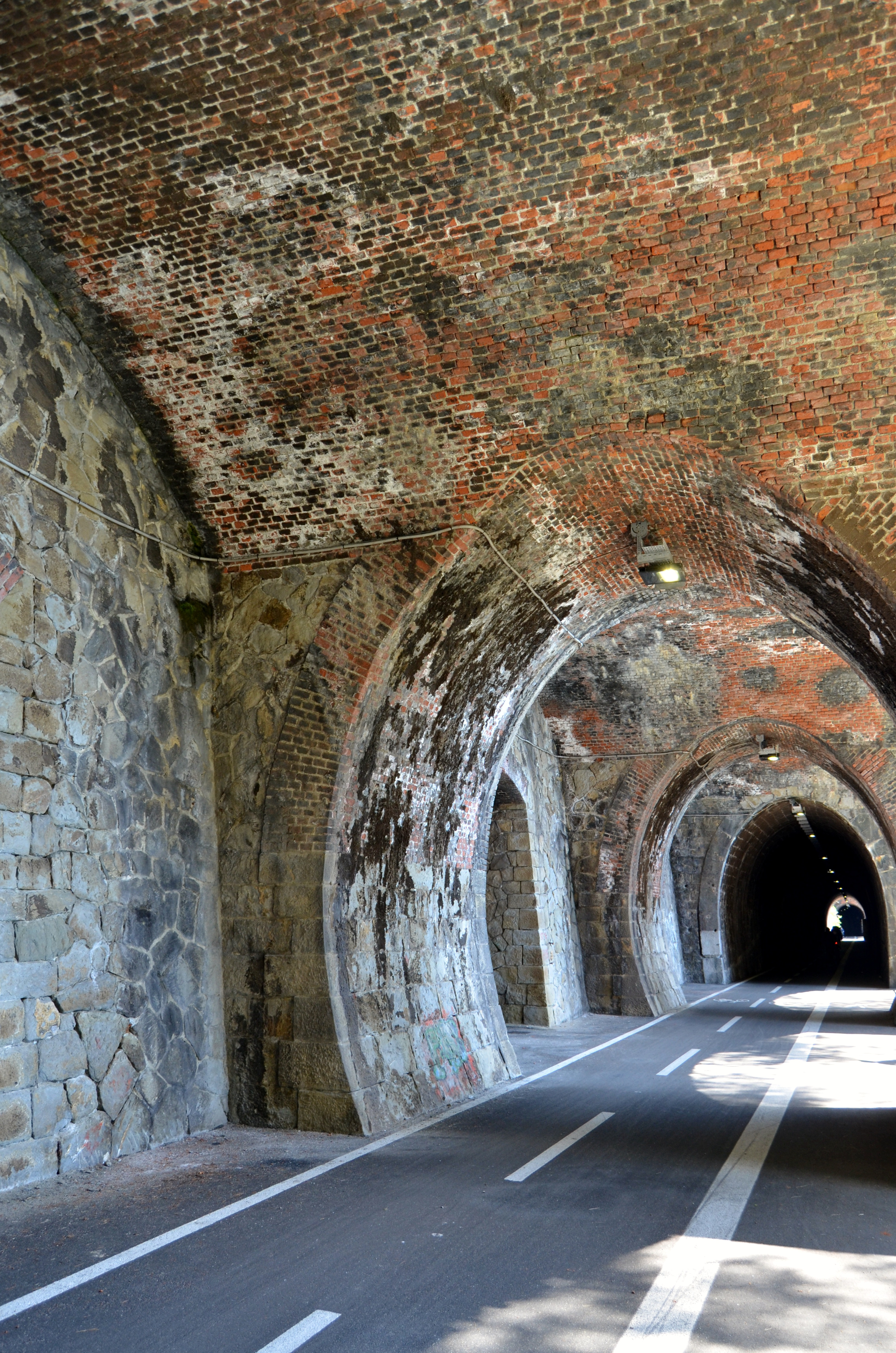
Bicycle path between the municipalities of Framura and Bonassola, Liguria, Italy

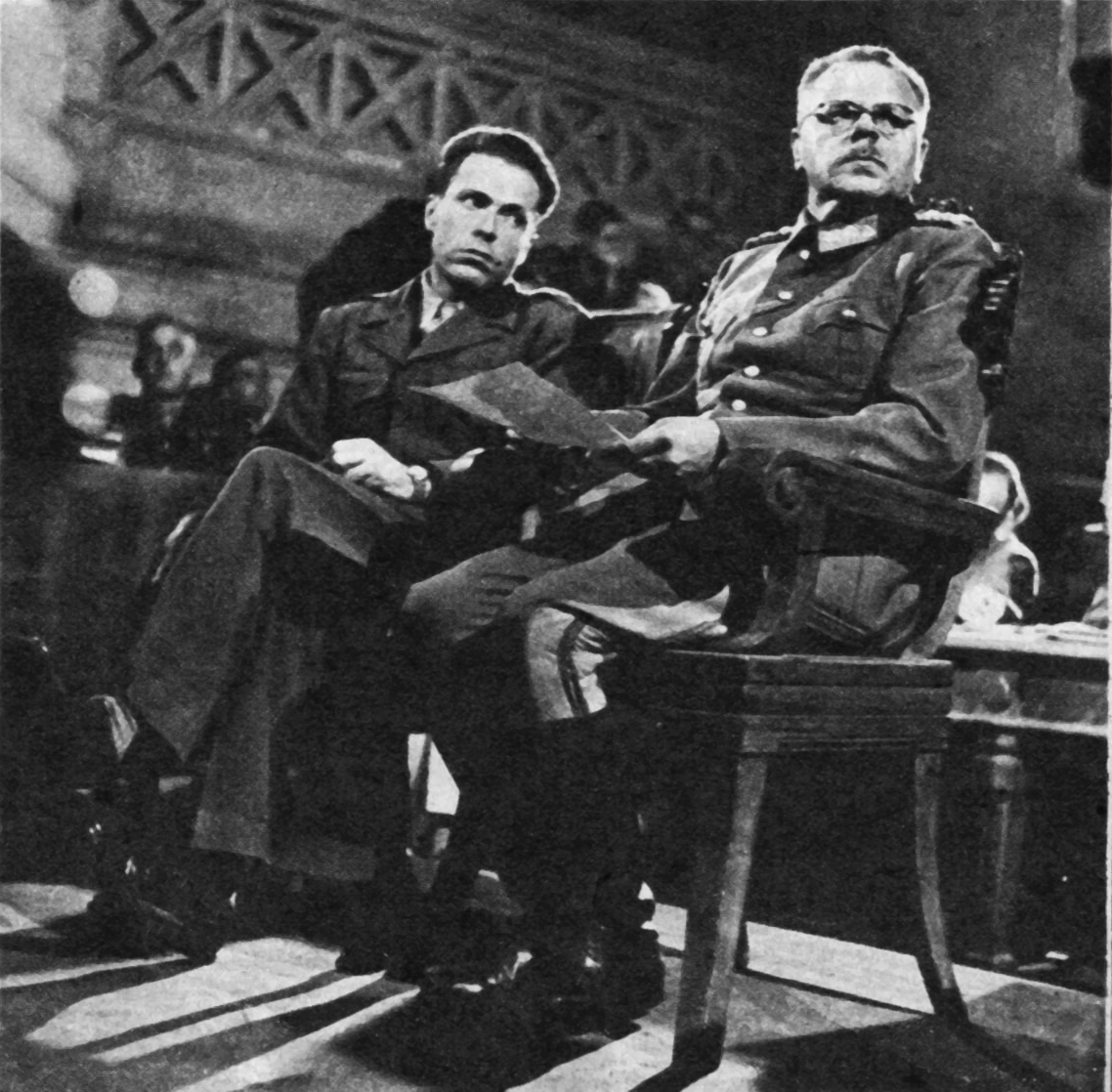
Anton Dostler on trial in 1945 — at the Palace of Caserta in Italy.

== Commandos ==
The OSS recruited Italian-American soldiers into the Operational Group (OG) for the Ginny mission because some of them could speak Italian and their knowledge of the country's language in which they were expected to operate was deemed very helpful to communicate with the local population. In Ginny 1 the working party was headed by First Lt. Vincent Russo and members of his team were T/5 Salvatore Di Sclafani; T/5 John J. Leone; T/5 Angelo Sirico; T/5 John Lepore; T/5 Vittorio Amoruso; T/5 Thomas Savino; and T/5 Joseph Noia. The security team, headed by First Lt. Paul J. Traficante, consisted of T/Sgt. Livio Vieceli; Sgt. Carmine Armando; Sgt. Dominick Mauro; T/5 Joseph Libardi; and T/5 Rosario Squatrito.

In Ginny II, most members from the previous mission were the same except four members—Sgt. Carmine Armando, T/5 John Lepore, T/5 Vittorio Amoruso, and T/5 Thomas Savino—were replaced by T/5 Joseph M. Farrell, T/5 Liberty J. Tremonte, T/5 Santoro Calcara, and Sgt Alfred L. De Flumeri for this mission.

== Ginny I ==
The first mission of Ginny I occurred on February 27/28, 1944. A fifteen-man OSS Operational Group (OG) was put aboard two U.S. Navy PT boats and the boats were to depart from a harbor in Bastia at 1800 hrs for the mission. However, the departure was delayed by 45 minutes after the lead boat with the working party on board had to be replaced due to a faulty radar. At 1845 hrs, the two boats finally departed from the harbor and sailed northward across the Ligurian Sea toward Stazione de Framura but were further delayed several times to avoid suspicious enemy radar sightings: neither enemy vessels nor aircraft were spotted visually.

The boats arrived at the disembarkation point at 0125 hrs and the sabotage team began using rubber boats and paddled northeastward. Both the working and security parties landed at what they thought was the right spot and were properly dressed in U.S. Army uniforms and had no civilian clothes with them. However, Russo noticed that something was wrong. He heard the train northeast of him and realized he and his team had landed south of the objective instead. At 0245 hrs, he reported that it would take him and his team at least an hour and a half to reach its target—0415 hrs at least—and requested permission to stay and be picked up the following night. The senior officer afloat rejected this suggestion because according to the plan, the team had to complete the sabotage mission and rendezvous back to the PT boats by 0330 hrs—0400 hrs at the latest—in order to distance themselves from the Ligurian coast and to avoid German patrol before sunrise. Fearing that the team would not complete the mission on time, the senior officer ordered the team to return to the PT boats. The OSS team went back to the PT boats by 0315 hrs and returned to Bastia harbor at 0730 hrs.

== Ginny II ==
For Ginny II, the mission objective and planning remain unchanged from the previous mission. Four OSS members who previously took part in Ginny I were replaced by others (see above) for Ginny II and T/5 Joseph Noia was placed in the security party instead. First Lt. Russo still commanded the shore party and First Lt. Paul J. Traficante for the security party. A contingency plan was developed i.e. if the team were unable to complete the mission in time, they would return to the shore to be picked up by PT boats. If the PT boats were gone, the team would find a safehouse, hide out there and wait for the PT boats to pick them up the next night.

On March 22, the OSS Operational Group (OG) team boarded the two U.S. Navy PT boats and the boats left Bastia harbor at 1800 hrs. The boats arrived at the disembarkation point in 2245 hrs, 300 yards southwest of the pinpoint, and the OSS team departed northward in three rubber boats at 2255 hrs (2245 hrs according to the PT's boat report) to west of Stazione di Framura and landed what they believe was the exact spot. Like Ginny I, the OSS members were properly dressed in U.S. Army uniforms and had no civilian clothes on them. Calcura, Tremonte, and Farrell wore paratrooper boots with the others wearing regulation G.I. shoes with canvas leggings. They also wore knit stocking caps and had their jackets inside-out. They wore no distinctive markings that indicated the branch of OSS so the only insignia the OSS men had were U.S. Army ranks patched on either their sleeves of shirts or their field jackets. The men all were armed with Colt.45 automatic pistols and Fairbairn–Sykes fighting knives with six of the team carrying 9-mm Marlin submachine guns.

At approximately 2345 hrs, a convoy of German torpedo boats was sighted returning from a mine-laying mission. One U.S. PT boat took diversionary action and got into a firefight, while the other idled along the coast on one engine and tried to keep in contact with the shore party. The radiomen on the U.S. boats kept trying to reach the shore party, but all was silent. At 0200 hrs, the two U.S. PT boats rendezvoused five miles out to sea because their radar indicated numerous targets along the shore, and they had to lie quietly until 0300 hrs. At that time, the U.S. boats moved in close to the rocky cliffs in an attempt to raise the mission party on the radio. One U.S. PT boat reported its main steering mechanism had malfunctioned, and it was 0400 hrs before it was repaired. No transmissions were heard from the mission party, and the two U.S. boats returned to base.

=== Hiding ===
Russo realized that he and his team were again in the wrong spot. He discovered that they had landed near the village of Carpineggio, about halfway between Bonassola and Stazione di Framura. The group had landed two miles from its intended initial point and about one mile from the target. Unable to contact the U.S. PT boats which had returned to base, Russo and his men then went to the contingency plan. They were to hide during the day, establish contact with their PT boats the following night, and then accomplish the mission. The team would not blow the tunnel until contact had been made.

They hid their rubber boats and explosives and demolition equipment under the trees as best they could and began moving up slope. They eventually found an empty barn on the edge of the locality of Carpeneggio and settled in. On the morning of March 23, two team members, 1st Lt. Russo and Sgt. Mauro, went out to get food and information at the nearest farm. An Italian farmer named Franco Lagaxo saw Russo and Mauro approaching his cottage who identified themselves as U.S. soldiers and was asked if he could buy food for them. He agreed to do so and later in the day guided them on reconnaissance which succeeded in locating access to the Genoa-La Spezia rail tunnel.

On the evening of March 23, the U.S. PT boats were launched to accomplish the pickup per the contingency plan in order to make prearranged radio contact with the OSS team. However, they again ran into trouble as one had a mechanical breakdown on the trip from Corsica and had to return to base. The second spotted a radar trace which indicated enemy activity approaching the coast, and was also forced to turn back. As a result, the OSS team was forced into another day of hiding.

=== Capture ===
An Italian fisherman noticed the rubber boats pulled up along the shore, and mentioned them to authorities at nearby Bonassola. Two Fascist Italian militiamen went with the fisherman to investigate and found the boats and explosive material. They alerted the local German command, formed a search party, and started sweeping the area. Lagaxo then discovered that the Italians and Germans had found the rubber boats and rushed in to warn the Americans. His warning came too late. All fifteen U.S. soldiers who were staying in the barn were captured after minor clashes with Italian Fascist and German soldiers. The captured OSS members were taken to the German headquarters of the 135th Fortress Brigade in La Spezia for interrogation. One of the U.S. officers revealed to the Germans that it was a commando raid to blow up tunnels critical to German supply routes.

=== Execution ===
On the next morning of March 25, the information about the capture of U.S. soldiers and the purpose of the mission was then sent to General of the Infantry Anton Dostler at the 75th German Army Corps headquarters. Dostler at first informed his superior, Field Marshal Albert Kesselring, commanding general of all German forces in Italy, about the captured U.S. commandos and what to do with them. According to Dostler's adjutant officer, Kesselring responded by ordering the execution and Dostler signed an order that all fifteen American prisoners of war were to be executed the next morning. The order was the implementation of the 1942 Commando Order issued by Hitler which stipulated the execution without trial of all captured Allied commandos, even those in proper uniforms, behind German lines. Alexander zu Dohna-Schlobitten, an aide to General Dostler, and unaware of the secret order, refused to sign the execution order because he knew that executing properly uniformed combatants was a direct violation of the Geneva Convention (1929). He was later dismissed from the Wehrmacht for insubordination. German officers at the 135th Fortress Brigade contacted Dostler in an attempt to achieve a stay of execution. However, General Dostler rejected their request and ordered the execution of American prisoners to be carried out the next morning. Two last attempts were made by officers at the 135th to stop the execution, including some by telephone, but these efforts were unsuccessful.

On the morning of March 26, fifteen U.S. soldiers—still in U.S. Army uniforms—were marched and lined up by the German Army in Punta Bianca, above the sea on the rocky tip of Ameglia's peninsula. All were executed on the spot and buried in a mass grave that was then camouflaged. None of the executed U.S. soldiers were given a previous trial.

== Aftermath ==
After Nazi Germany signed its instrument of surrender that effectively ended the war in Europe on May 8, 1945, Kesselring surrendered to the Americans at Saalfeld and was placed in confinement. On October 6, 1945, he was interviewed in connection with the deaths of fifteen Americans. He stated that he did not recall receiving any information regarding the fifteen OSS members. He contended that he received many reports and that he was frequently away from his headquarters in Rome. Kesselring was also questioned about Hitler's Commando Order which was clearly unlawful. He replied that the order was not binding on him and that it could be interpreted in many different ways. Due to falsification and destruction of his records to hide this affair, he was not prosecuted for this crime.

General Dostler was captured by U.S. forces on May 8, 1945, and brought to trial before an American military tribunal at the seat of the Supreme Allied Commander, the Royal Palace in Caserta on October 8, 1945. In the first Allied war trial, Dostler was accused of carrying out an illegal order. In his defense, he maintained that he had revoked his first order to shoot the men but he had eventually re-issued it on higher order and that the execution of the OSS team was a lawful reprisal. Dostler also bluntly lied that the captured OSS men were dressed in civilian clothes. Then, when questioned why they were found in U.S. uniforms, he said that they wore no distinctive markings that distinguished themselves as Americans and therefore received no protection under the rules of war (which was rebuffed since the dead OSS men had insignia of their U.S. Army ranks). Dostler's plea of superior orders failed because, by ordering the execution he had acted on his own outside the Fuhrer's order. The military commission also rejected his plea, declaring that Dostler's execution of U.S. soldiers was in violation of Article 2 of the 1929 Geneva Convention on Prisoners of War, which prohibited acts of reprisals against prisoners of war. The commission stated that "[n]o soldier, and still less a Commanding General, can be heard to say that he considered the summary shooting of prisoners of war legitimate even as a reprisal."

Four days later, the trial unanimously found General Dostler guilty of war crimes, rejecting his defense of superior orders. He was sentenced to death and executed by a firing squad on December 1, 1945, in Aversa, about 15 kilometres north of Naples. The Dostler case became a precedent for the principle, used in the Nuremberg Trials of German generals, officials, and Nazi leaders beginning in November 1945, that using superior orders as a defense does not relieve officers from responsibility of carrying out illegal orders and their liability to be punished in court. This principle was codified in Principle IV of the Nuremberg Principles, and similar principles were found in sections of the Universal Declaration of Human Rights.

== Memorial ==
There is a memorial for the 15 executed American soldiers in Piazza della Liberta, Ameglia. To commemorate the 60th anniversary of the mission in 2004, the American OSS Society and the Comune of Ameglia placed a commemorative plaque at Punta Bianca and erected a formal monument at Bocca di Magra.
