= Kosminsky =

Kosminsky, feminine: Kosminskaya is a Russian surname originated in clergy, derived from the name of St. Cosmas. Polish equivalent: Kośminski/Kośminska. Notable people with the surname include:

- Ekaterina Kosminskaya
- Eugene Kosminsky
- Peter Kosminsky
