= La Francesca =

Coastline area of Riviera di Levante

La Francesca is a historical name for the coastal area of Liguria Eastern Riviera, currently in the province of La Spezia (Municipality of Bonassola). Well known in the 13th century for its copper mines (active until the last century), the site took probably its name from one of the branches of the ancient road “Francesca” or “Francigena”, a major route in the Middle Ages for pilgrims on their way to France, Canterbury and Santiago de Compostela.

Characterized by a favourable microclimate - a hill protects the south-exposed valley from the north winds – with species flowering all the year round, even after the terrible fire of 1999 that has destroyed the pinewood, the site continues to maintain to its flora and fauna a high nature value. As from 1961 it is occupied by the tourist resort with the same name.
