= Montemarcello =

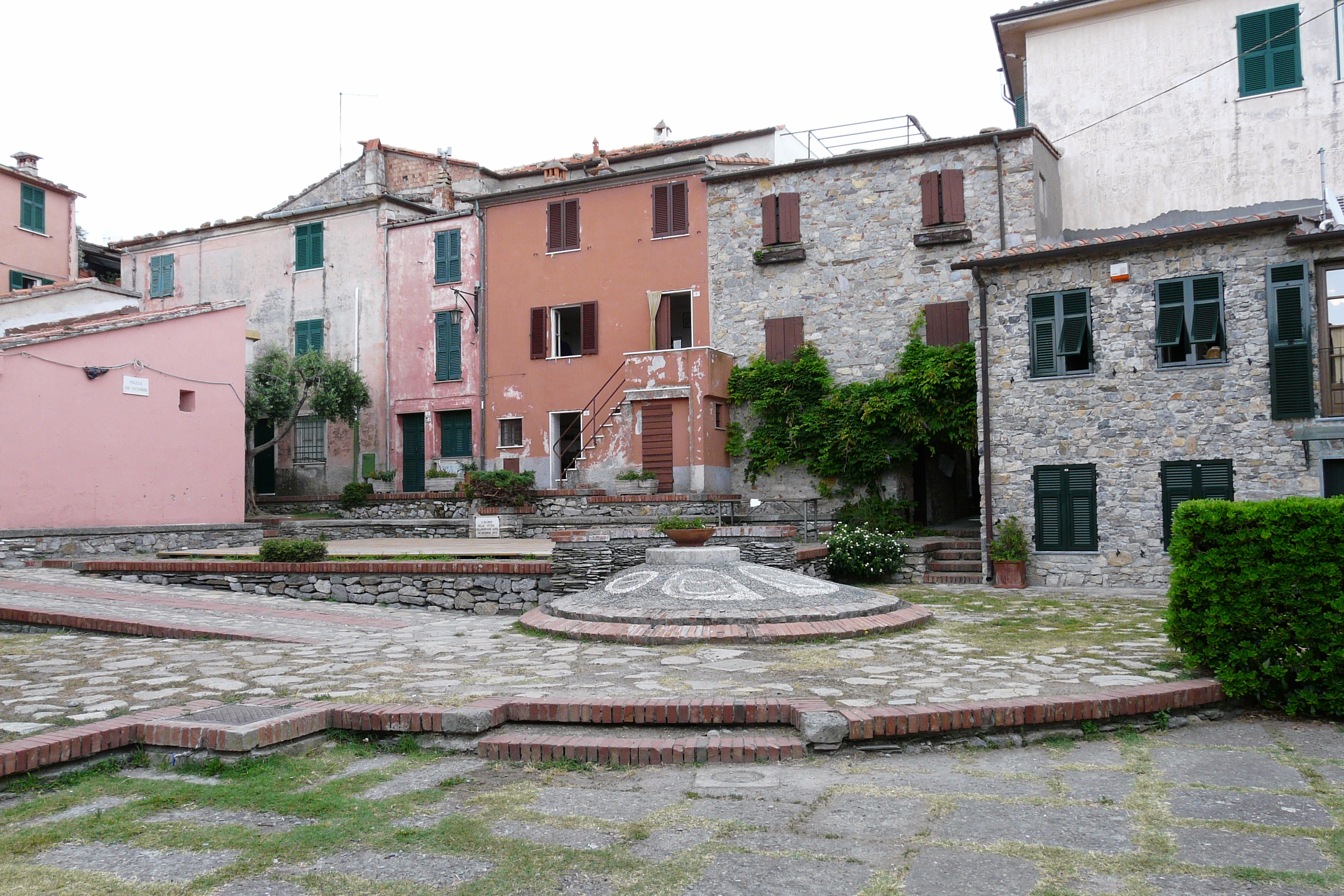

- Location within Italy
- Coordinates: 44°02′51″N 09°57′57″E
- Country: Italy
- Region: Liguria
- Province: La Spezia
- Comune: Ameglia
- Elevation: 266 m (873 ft)
- Time zone: +1
- Postal code: 19030
- Area code: 0187

Montemarcello is a frazione of the comune of Ameglia (Italy). It is the home to the Regional natural Park of Montemarcello-Magra. It is one of I Borghi più belli d'Italia ("The most beautiful villages of Italy").
