= Framura =

Framura Framua (Ligurian)
- Comune
- Comune di Framura
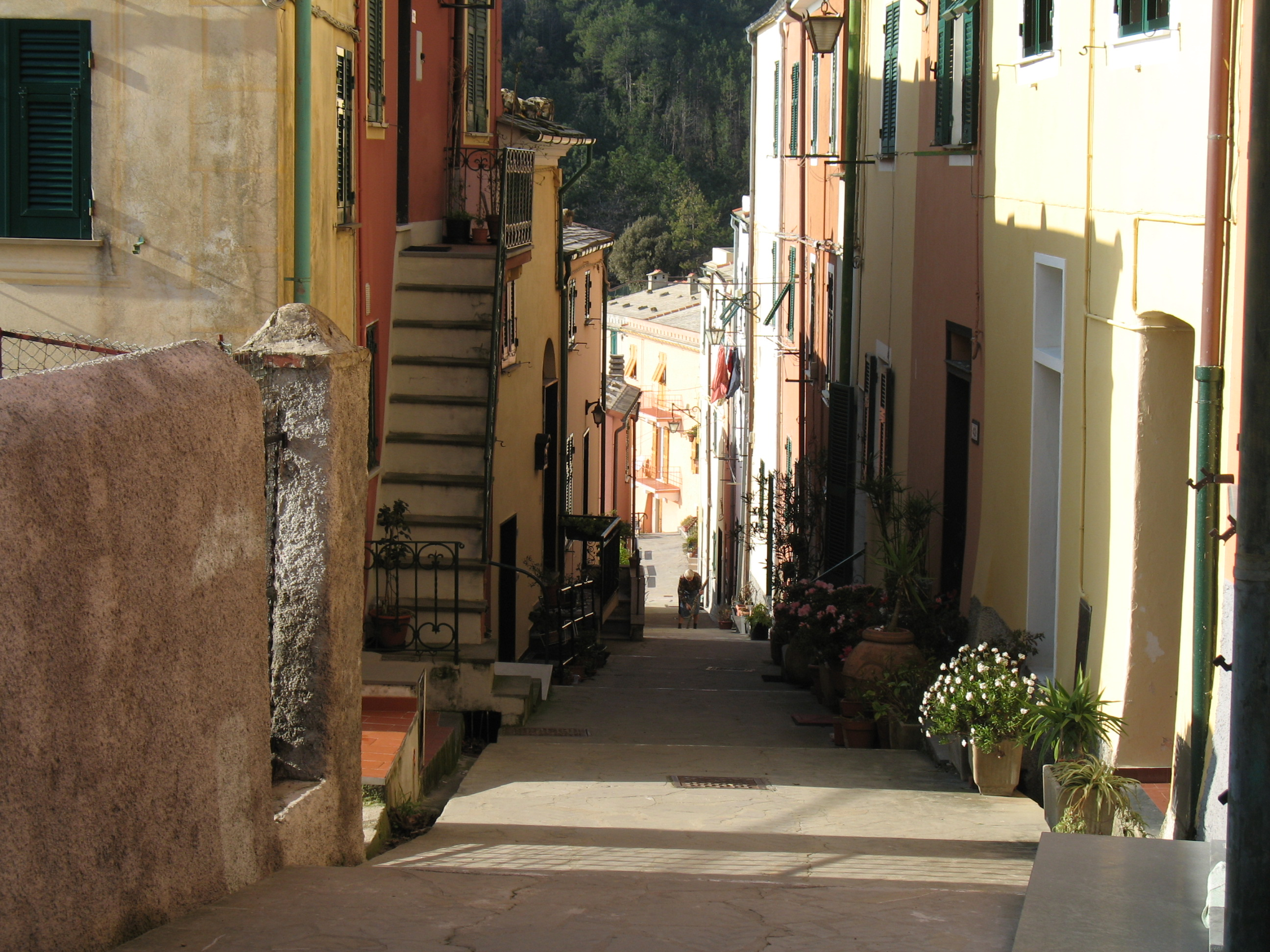
- Street in the historical centre

- Coat of arms

- Location within Italy Location within Liguria
- Coordinates: 44°13′N 9°33′E
- Country: Italy
- Region: Liguria
- Province: Province of La Spezia (SP)
- Frazioni: Anzo, Ravecca, Setta, Costa, Castagnola

Area
  - Total: 18.9 km^{2} (7.3 sq mi)

Population (Dec. 2004)
  - Total: 739
  - Density: 39.1/km^{2} (101/sq mi)
- Time zone: UTC+1 (CET)
  - Summer (DST): UTC+2 (CEST)
- Postal code: 19014
- Dialing code: 0187
- Website: http://www.comune.framura.sp.it/

Framura (Ligurian: Framua [fɾaˈmyːa]) is a comune (municipality) in the Province of La Spezia in the Italian region Liguria, located about 50 kilometres (31 mi) southeast of Genoa and about 25 kilometres (16 mi) northwest of La Spezia. As of 31 December 2004, it had a population of 739 and an area of 18.9 square kilometres (7.3 mi^{2}).

The municipality of Framura contains the frazioni (subdivisions, mainly villages and hamlets) Anzo, Ravecca, Setta, Costa, and Castagnola. Framura borders the following municipalities: Bonassola, Carrodano, Deiva Marina, Levanto. It is one of I Borghi più belli d'Italia ("The most beautiful villages of Italy").

== History ==
During World War II, American 15-men missions called Operations Ginny I and II tried to land and blow up a railway tunnel between Framura and Bonassola. Both missions failed but the second mission's soldiers were executed and buried in a mass grave by the German Army.

== Demographic evolution ==
Historical population

| Year | Pop. | ±% |
|---|---|---|
| 1861 | 1,119 | — |
| 1871 | 1,236 | +10.5% |
| 1881 | 1,230 | −0.5% |
| 1901 | 1,193 | −3.0% |
| 1911 | 1,236 | +3.6% |

| Year | Pop. | ±% |
|---|---|---|
| 1921 | 1,383 | +11.9% |
| 1931 | 1,356 | −2.0% |
| 1936 | 1,282 | −5.5% |
| 1951 | 1,216 | −5.1% |
| 1961 | 1,042 | −14.3% |

| Year | Pop. | ±% |
|---|---|---|
| 1971 | 972 | −6.7% |
| 1981 | 913 | −6.1% |
| 1991 | 839 | −8.1% |
| 2001 | 744 | −11.3% |

Source: Data from ISTAT
