= Ameglia =

Ameglia Megia (Ligurian)
- Comune
- Comune di Ameglia
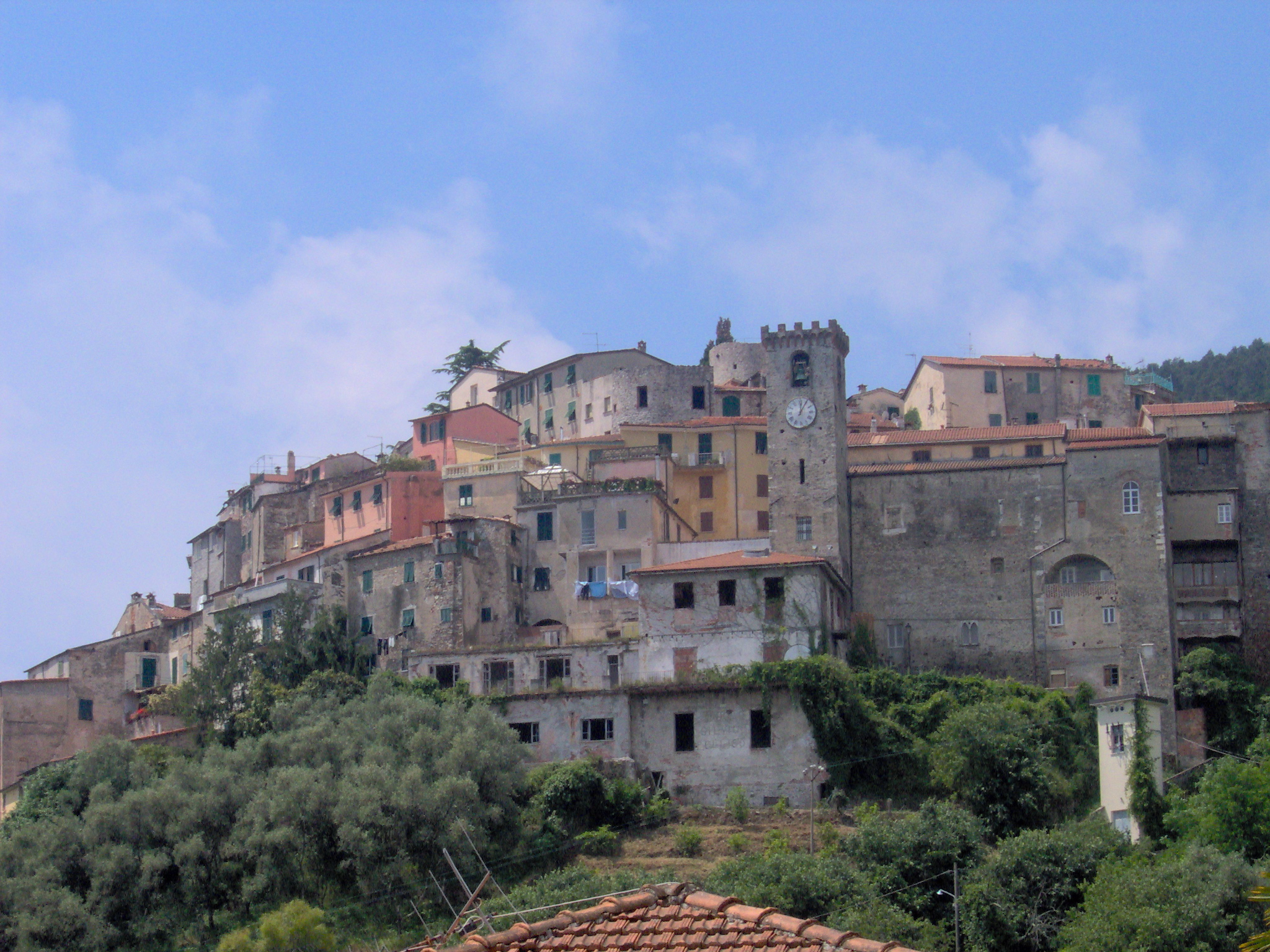

- Coat of arms

- Location within Italy Location within Liguria
- Coordinates: 44°4′N 9°57′E
- Country: Italy
- Region: Liguria
- Province: La Spezia (SP)
- Frazioni: Bocca di Magra, Fiumaretta, Montemarcello

Government
  - Mayor: Andrea De Ranieri

Area
  - Total: 14.17 km^{2} (5.47 sq mi)
- Elevation: 89 m (292 ft)

Population (2025)
  - Total: 4,265
  - Density: 301.0/km^{2} (779.6/sq mi)
- Demonym: Amegliesi
- Time zone: UTC+1 (CET)
  - Summer (DST): UTC+2 (CEST)
- Postal code: 19031
- Dialing code: 0187
- Website: Official website

Ameglia (Italian: [aˈmeʎʎa]; Ligurian: Ameggia, locally Megia [ˈmeːdʒa]) is a municipality in the Province of La Spezia in the region of Liguria in Italy, located about 90 kilometres (56 mi) southeast of Genoa and about 11 kilometres (7 mi) southeast of La Spezia. It has a population of 4,265.

Ameglia borders the municipalities of Lerici and Sarzana.

== History ==
Ameglia and its territory have an ancient history, that dates back to the 4th century BC, and that displays a maintained importance over the centuries. A necropolis was found in this place and the objects and furnishings discovered reveal that the place was an important transportation center both towards the sea and the nearby mountain passes. It was an important center and port in the Roman era. Traces of this period can be seen in the remains of a Roman maritime villa near the current seaside hamlet of Bocca di Magra.

It was, however, in the early Middle Ages that Ameglia reached its apex of political and economic importance. In 963, it was mentioned for the first time in an imperial document of Otto I, where the castrum de Ameliae is mentioned as a possession of the Diocese of Luni. Ameglia was chosen by the diocese as an episcopal residence, its walls fortified and reinforced, during the 11th century.

In 1141, part of the fief was purchased by Genoa, which held it until 1252 when it entered into the possession of Nicolò Fieschi, count of Lavagna. Occupied for a brief period by Oberto Doria and Oberto Spinola, possession of Ameglia returned, by 1284, to the bishops of Luni. Throughout the 13th century, construction of the defensive walls, the port, and the tower of the local castle continued.

In 1314, according to Boccaccio in his Epistola di frate Ilaro, Dante Alighieri was probably present near the monastery of Santa Croce del Corvo in Bocca di Magra.

In 1321, Ameglia was conquered by the Lucchesi condottiero Castruccio Castracani, bringing the territory under the rule of Lucca. After his death in 1328, the medieval citadel passed under the influence of different lords and local families, including the Doria, Visconti, and Fregoso. Genoa would reacquire the feudal rights by 1380.

Over the next century, control over Ameglia changed hands several times until reaching a certain stability with a definitive acquisition by the Republic of Genoa, in the second half of the 16th century. Ameglia was placed under the captaincy of Lerici.

With the fall of the Genoese Republic to the French forces of Napoleon Bonaparte, Ameglia became, on December 2, 1797, part of the short-lived Ligurian Republic. It was located in the Department of the Gulf of Venus, whose capital was La Spezia. Reorganizations placed Ameglia in the Jurisdiction of Lunigiana in 1798 and the Jurisdiction of the Gulf of Venus in 1803. After the Ligurian Republic was directly annexed by France, the town was part of the department of the Apennins from June 1805 to Napoleon's fall in 1814.

As a result of the Congress of Vienna, in 1815, Liguria became part of the Kingdom of Sardinia, where it remained until Italian unification in 1861. From 1859 to 1927, the territory was included in the district of Levante within the Province of Genoa and, from 1923, the Province of La Spezia.

In 1939 the frazione of Tellaro was detached and consolidated into the territory of Lerici. The latest adjustments to the town's territory were in 1960 when part of Lerici was joined to Ameglia.

In March 1944, 15 U.S. soldiers of Italian descent were captured by German forces nearby after the failure of the infrastructure-sabotage mission Operation Ginny II. On March 26, they were summarily executed in Ameglia in violation of the Geneva Convention's rules regarding treatment of prisoners of war. After the war, the Wehrmacht general who ordered the executions, Anton Dostler, was tried and executed for war crimes, the first German general so tried. The rejection of his defense that he was just following orders set a precedent for the Nuremberg trials. In 1990, a memorial plaque was placed at the site of the deaths of the U.S. soldiers.

Ameglia was affected by the October 25, 2011 flooding of the areas of La Spezia and Lunigiana due to the overflowing of the Magra and Vara rivers, leading to evacuations, property damage, and the collapse of the Colombiera Bridge.

== Demographics ==
As of 2025, Ameglia has a population of 4,265, of whom 49.4% are male and 50.6% are female. Minors make up 10.8% of the population, and seniors make up 31.4%, compared to the Italian average of 14.9% and 24.7% respectively.

As of 2024, the foreign-born population is 421, equal to 9.8% of the population. The 5 largest foreign nationalities are Romanians (96), Moroccans (44), Albanians (29), Ukrainians (16) and Moldovans (15).

Historical population

Year	Pop.	±%
1861	1,488	—
1871	1,582	+6.3%
1881	1,897	+19.9%
1901	2,414	+27.3%
1911	2,806	+16.2%
1921	3,199	+14.0%
1931	3,577	+11.8%
1936	3,614	+1.0%

Year	Pop.	±%
1951	3,657	+1.2%
1961	3,740	+2.3%
1971	3,888	+4.0%
1981	4,610	+18.6%
1991	4,259	−7.6%
2001	4,520	+6.1%
2011	4,484	−0.8%
2021	4,318	−3.7%

Source: ISTAT

== Main sights ==
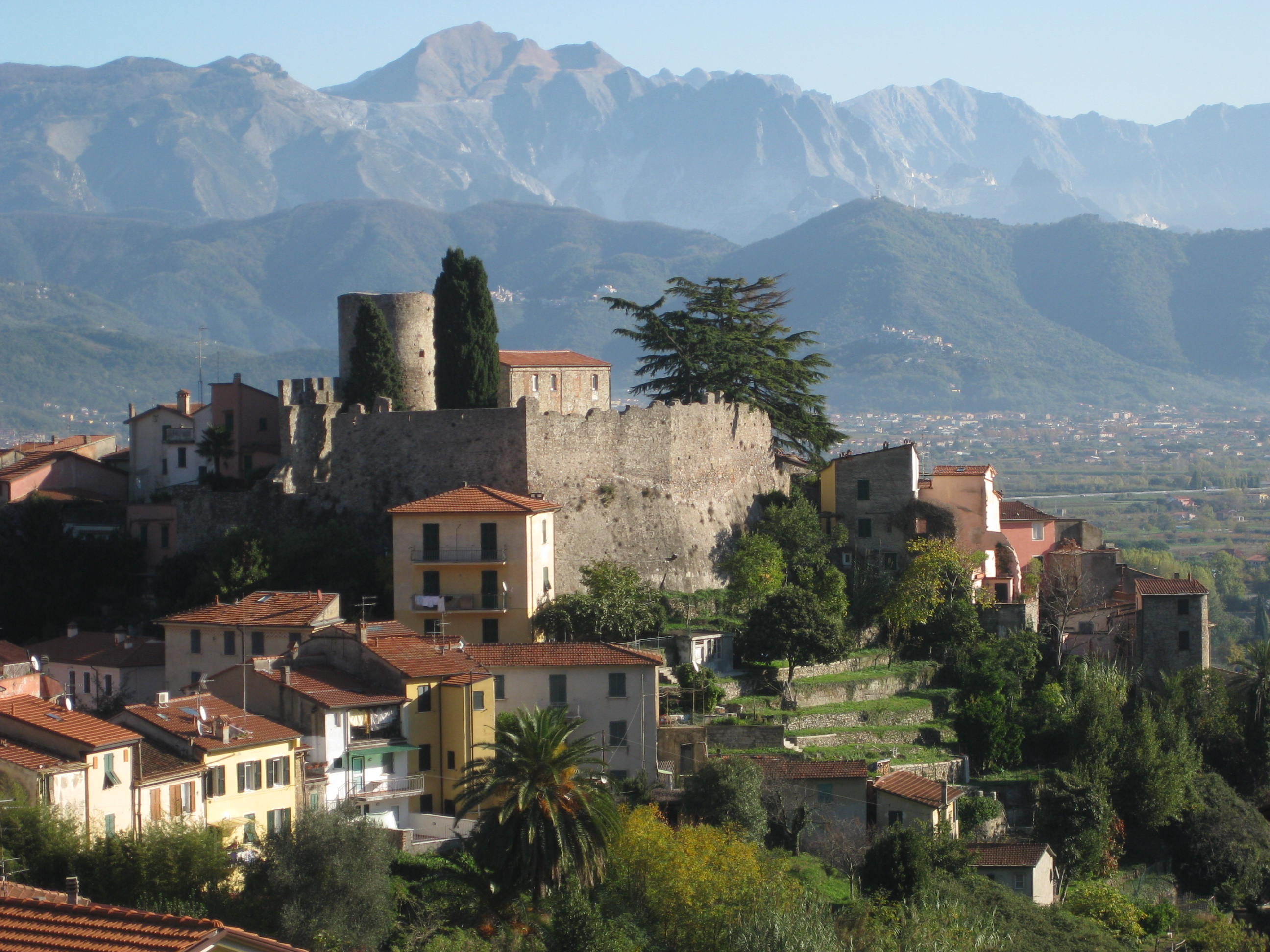
Ameglia Castle and Apuan Alps

- Castle of Ameglia, a stronghold of the bishops of Luni, rebuilt in 1174. Later it was owned by Sarzana, Genoa, Castruccio Castracani, the Visconti and the Bank of Saint George.
- Monastery of Santa Croce del Corvo, founded in 1176.
- Pre-Roman necropolis at Cafaggio, and archaeological remains of the Roman coastal road
- Orto Botanico di Montemarcello
- The Comune of Ameglia includes the frazioni of Montemarcello, Bocca di Magra, and Fiumaretta.

== Transport ==
The state highway that goes through the municipal territory of Ameglia is the SS 432, the Strada statale 432 della Bocca di Magra. It serves as a coastal artery and connects the Strada statale 1 Via Aurelia in the neighborhood of Romito Magra, a frazione of Arcola, to Marina di Carrara. It serves as an important street for the purposes of commercial traffic.

There is also another route, provincial road SP 28, that connects Ameglia to Lerici. It goes through Montemarcello and, passing north of Tellaro, arrives in La Serra in Lerici. The scenic view from the road allows one to admire the Gulf of La Spezia and, on particularly clear days, the view of the Tyrrhenian Sea permits the sight of Cap Corse, the northern peninsula of Corsica.

At the mouth of the Magra River, near Bocca di Magra, there is a marina equipped for mooring small-to-medium recreational boats.

== Notable people ==
- Roberto Pazzi (1946-2023), novelist and poet, born here

== See also ==
- Operations Ginny I and II
