= Bonassola =

Bonassola Bonasseua (Ligurian)
- Comune
- Comune di Bonassola
- Aerial view of Bonassola from the south

- Coat of arms

- Location within Italy Location within Liguria
- Coordinates: 44°11′N 9°35′E
- Country: Italy
- Region: Liguria
- Province: Province of La Spezia (SP)
- Frazioni: Montaretto, Costella, Poggio, Serra, Scernio, San Giorgio

Government
  - Mayor: Andrea Poletti

Area
  - Total: 9.3 km^{2} (3.6 sq mi)
- Elevation: 5 m (16 ft)

Population (Dec. 2004)
  - Total: 945
  - Density: 100/km^{2} (260/sq mi)
- Demonym: Bonassolesi
- Time zone: UTC+1 (CET)
  - Summer (DST): UTC+2 (CEST)
- Postal code: 19011
- Dialing code: 0187
- Patron saint: S.Caterina da Alessandria
- Website: Official website

Bonassola (Ligurian: Bonasseua [bunaˈsøːa]) is a comune (municipality) in the Province of La Spezia in the Italian region Liguria, located about 60 kilometres (37 mi) southeast of Genoa and about 20 kilometres (12 mi) northwest of La Spezia. As of 31 December 2004, it had a population of 945 and an area of 9.3 square kilometres (3.6 mi^{2}).

The municipality of Bonassola contains the frazioni (subdivisions, mainly villages and hamlets) Montaretto, Costella, Serra, Scernio, and San Giorgio.

Bonassola borders the following municipalities: Framura, Levanto.

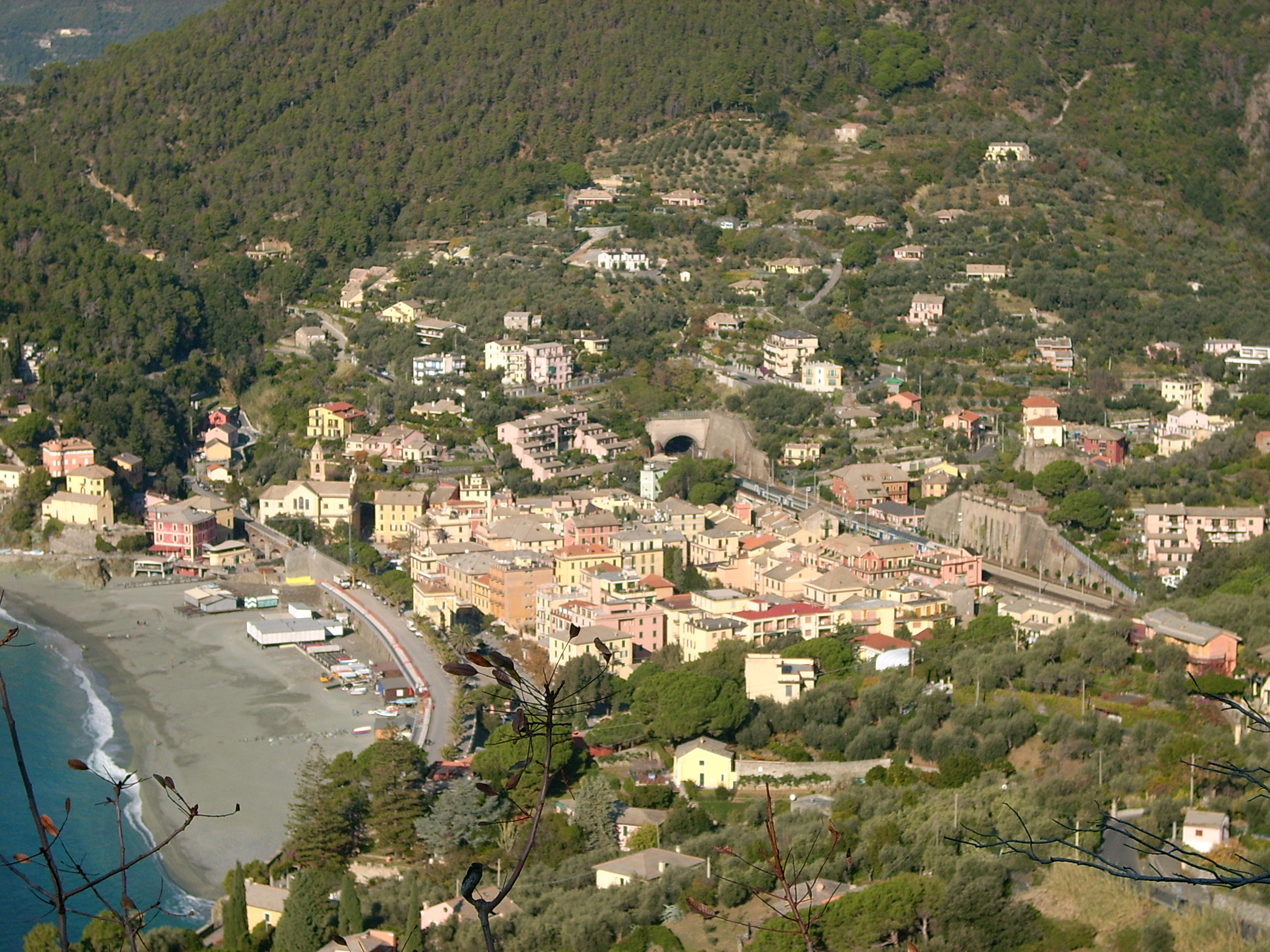
Bonassola, the beach, town and a railway tunnel

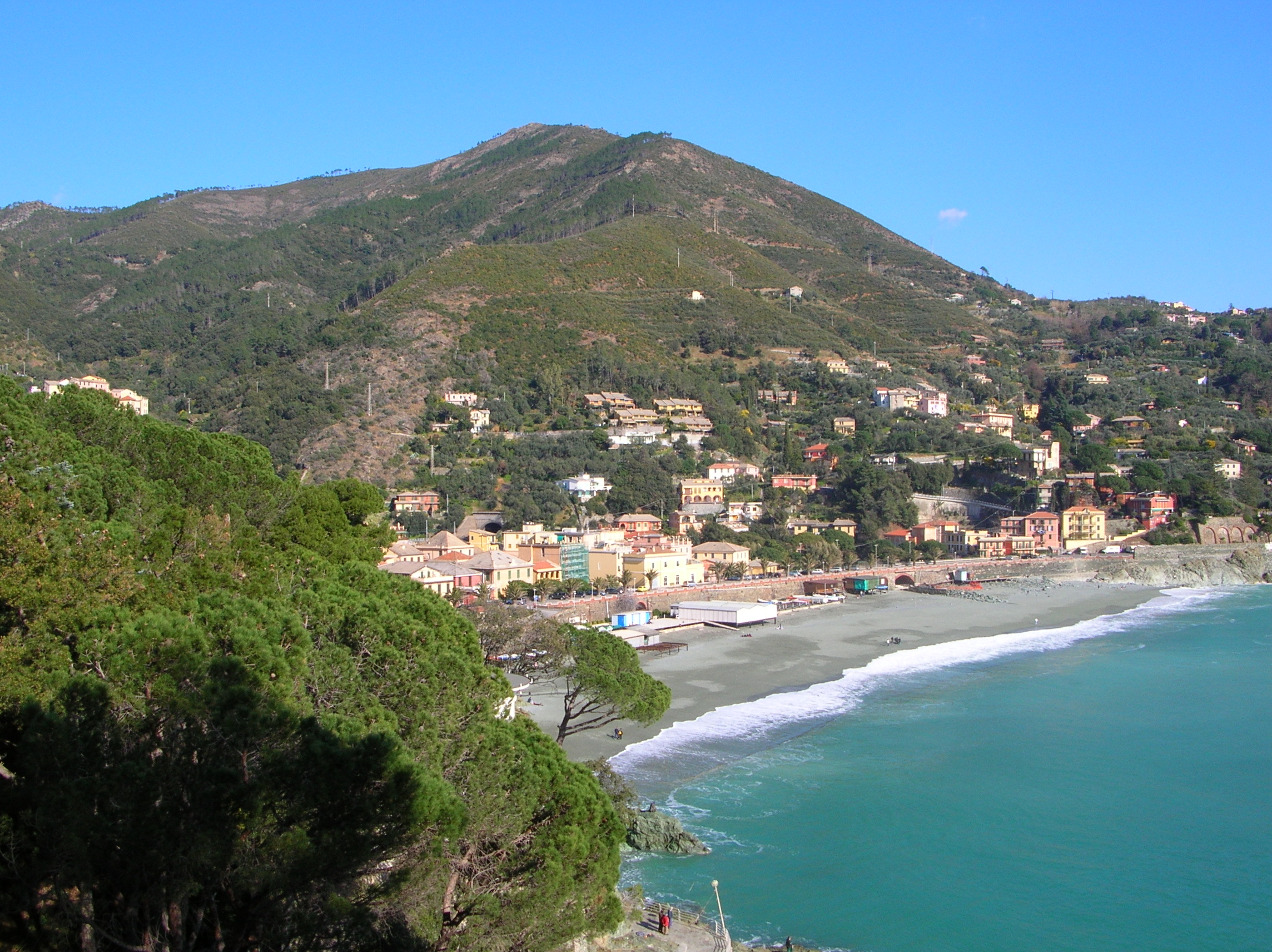
Bonassola

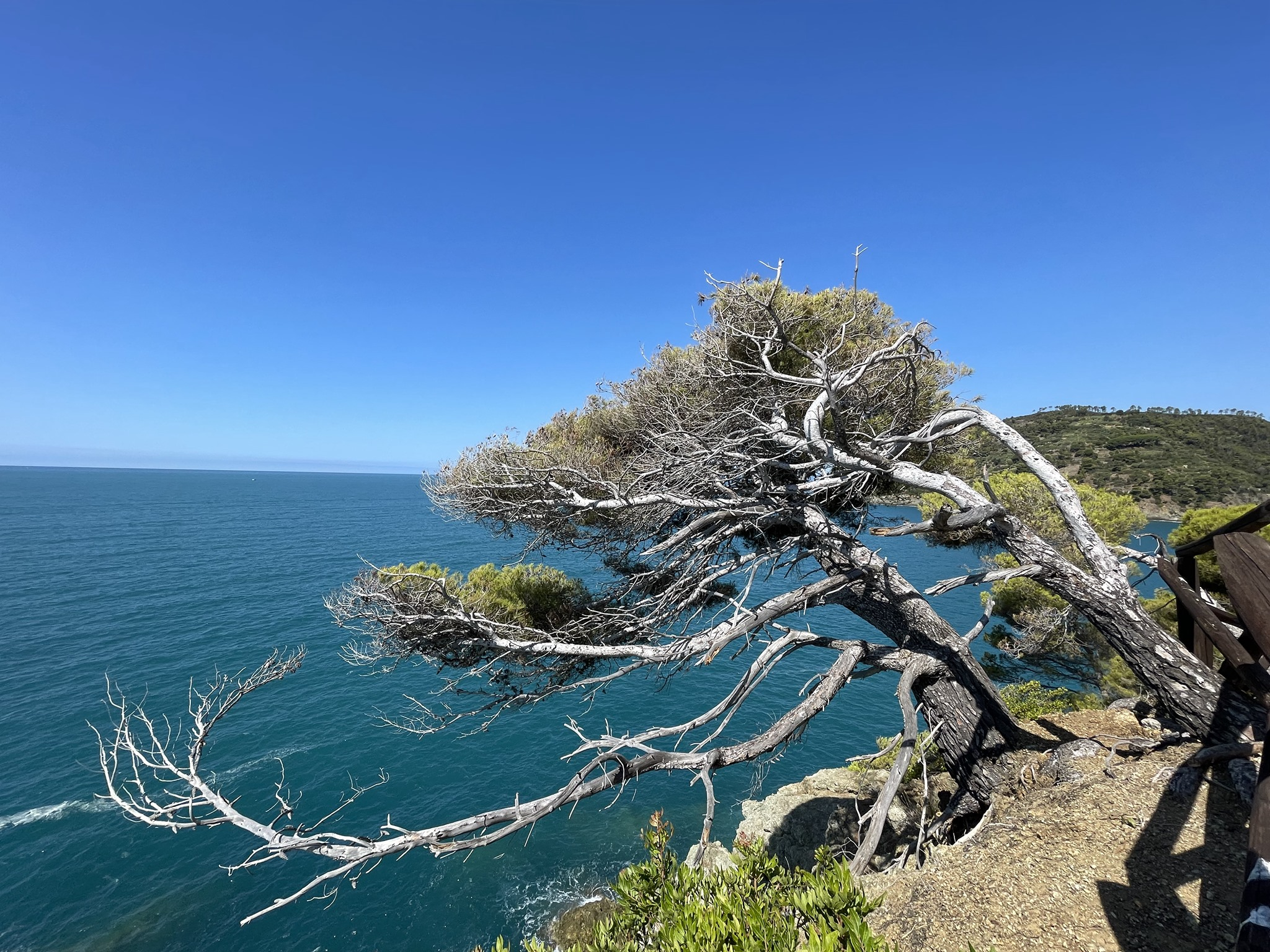
Bonassola path

== History ==
During World War II, two American fifteen men missions tried to land and blow up a railway tunnel between Framura and Bonassola. Both missions failed; the second mission's soldiers were executed and buried in a mass grave by the German Army.

== Demographic evolution ==
Historical population

Year	Pop.	±%
1861	1,159	—
1871	1,147	−1.0%
1881	1,268	+10.5%
1901	1,489	+17.4%
1911	1,475	−0.9%

Year	Pop.	±%
1921	1,487	+0.8%
1931	1,537	+3.4%
1936	1,548	+0.7%
1951	1,608	+3.9%
1961	1,429	−11.1%

Year	Pop.	±%
1971	1,190	−16.7%
1981	1,138	−4.4%
1991	1,071	−5.9%
2001	974	−9.1%

Source: Data from ISTAT

== See also ==
- La Francesca
