= Troyansky =

Troyansky, feminine: Troyanskaya is a Russian surname originated in clergy, derived from the name of the city of Troy. Notable people with the surname include:

- Fernando Troyansky
- Franco Troyansky
- Olga Troyanskaya
