= Massimo Amfiteatrof =

Italian cellist (1907–1990)

Massimo Amfiteatrof Максим Амфитеатров
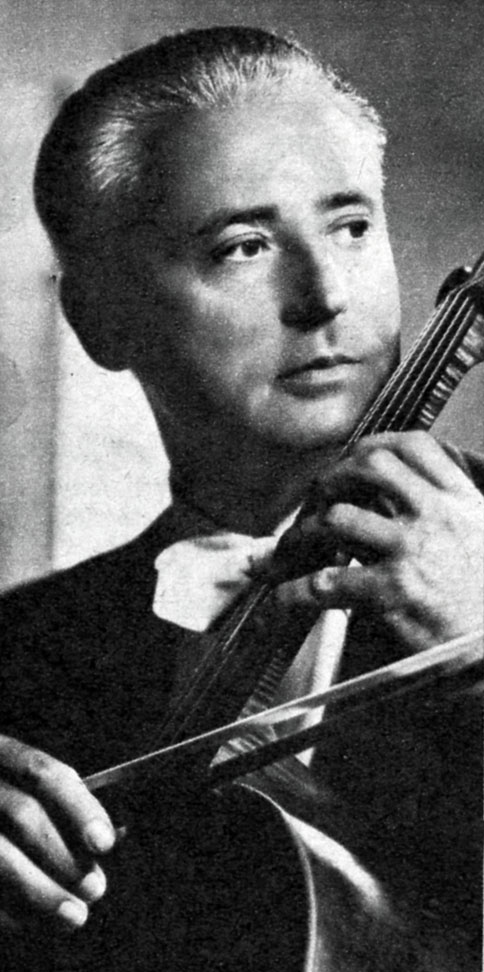

Background information
- Born: Maksim Aleksandrovič Amfiteatrov; 27 February 1907; Paris, France
- Origin: St. Petersburg, Russia
- Died: 19 December 1990 (aged 83) Levanto, Liguria, Italy
- Genres: Classical, Italian pop
- Occupation: Cellist
- Instrument: Cello
- Years active: 1920s–1990

Maksim Aleksandrovič Amfiteatrov (Russian: Максим Александрович Амфитеатров; 27 February 1907 – 19 December 1990), known as Massimo Amfiteatrof, was an Italian cellist of Russian descent, dubbed as the "Cellists' Caruso" (Italian: il Caruso dei Violoncellisti).

== Biography ==
Maksim Aleksandrovič Amfiteatrov was born in Paris, France, into a Russian family. His mother, Ilaria Vladimirovna Sokoloff, was an actress and a singer, while his father, Alexander Amfiteatrov, was a writer and a journalist. His brother, Daniele, became an orchestra conductor.

He lived in St. Petersburg, Empire of Russia, until 1917. When the Russian Revolution outbroke, his family escaped to Italy and settled in Liguria, first in Cavi (a frazione of Lavagna) and then in Levanto, in the Province of La Spezia.

In Levanto the Amfiteatrof family gave hospitality to other Russian refugees, especially artists, and made its house a well-known cultural and intellectual circle. Having a culturally strong background, Massimo Amfiteatrof began to study cello and moved to Milan to attend the local Conservatory. In 1924 Arturo Toscanini appointed him principal solo cello at La Scala at the age of 17, a role with whom he worked first with the EIAR Orchestra in Turin and then with the RAI Orchestra in Rome.

As a soloist, Amfiteatrof toured all Europe and America, sometimes together with pianist Marisa Candeloro. During the 1940s, he had formed a trio with violinist Arrigo Pelliccia and pianist Ornella Puliti Santoliquido. The Trio turned into the Quartetto di Roma as the violist Bruno Giuranna joined the group. Massimo Amfiteatrof also taught at the Conservatorio Santa Cecilia in Rome and at the Naples Conservatory and made some records (many of them published by Decca Records) together with the Virtuosi di Roma string quartet in which violinists such as Renato Fasano and Luigi Ferro did participate.

Although he was a classical musician, Massimo Amfiteatrof provided his talent to pop music artists and records. One of his best efforts has been his contribution to Fabrizio De Andre's album Non al denaro non all'amore né al cielo: Amfiteatrof played cello in two songs, "Un ottico" (An Optician) and "Un Blasfemo" (A Blasphemous One), under the baton of Nicola Piovani and together with violinist/violist Dino Asciolla.

After his retirement, Amfiteatrof continued to live in Levanto and died there in 1990. In 1992, two years after his death, the Ligurian town inaugurated the Amfiteatrof Music Festival, known until 2016 as Festival Massimo Amfiteatrof, a classical and chamber music festival that has reached the 25th edition in 2016.

== See also ==
- Aleksandr Amfiteatrov
- Daniele Amfitheatrof
- Levanto
- Amfiteatrof Music Festival
