= Alexander Amfiteatrov =

Russian writer and historian (1862–1938)

- Алекса́ндр Валенти́нович Амфитеа́тров
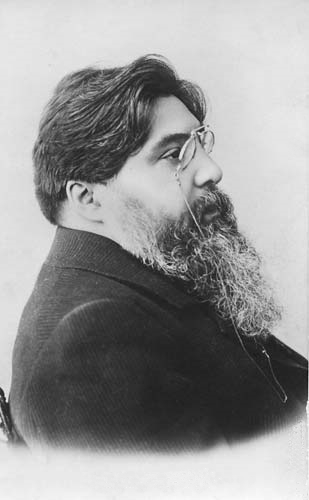
- Born: Alexander Valentinovich Amfiteatrov; 26 December 1862; Kaluga, Moscow Governorate, Russian Empire
- Died: 26 February 1938 (aged 75); Levanto, Liguria, Kingdom of Italy
- Spouse: Ilaria Sokoloff
- Children: Vladimir; Maksim; Daniil; Roman

Alexander Valentinovich Amfiteatrov (Note: Also spelled Amphiteatrof) (Russian: Алекса́ндр Валенти́нович Амфитеа́тров); (26 December 1862 – 26 February 1938) was a Russian writer, novelist, and historian.

== Biography ==
Born a priest's son in Kaluga, Russian Empire, he was trained as a lawyer but became a journalist and popular novelist. In 1902 he was exiled for writing a satirical article on the imperial family. He returned to visit the front during the Russo-Japanese War, then returned to Western Europe, living in France and Italy.

Amfiteatrov conceived writing a book on Nero and early Christianity in the 1890s. An Italian exile provided him with plenty of sources and evidence, and exposed him to leading European scholars, and in 1913 he completed Nero: The Beast out of the Bottomless Pit ("Зверь из бездны. Нерон", referring to Book of Revelation 11:7), a life story of Emperor Nero that evolved into a comprehensive encyclopedia of Rome at the end of Julio-Claudian dynasty and a critical review of contemporary historical concepts. By 1913 Amfiteatrov's eyesight was failing to the point where he could not proofread and edit typographic print, relying more on his memory than on reading, thus the first edition was released with major errors and continuity gaps. His second Roman study Arch of Titus, dedicated to early Christianity in Rome, was not completed.

In Italy he completed his most successful novels Vosmidesyatniki (The 80s-Niks) (1907–08) and Devyatidesyatniki (The 90s-Niks) (1911–13), dealing with the intelligentsia of the 1880s and 1890s, respectively. "Versatile and topical, but smartly superficial, Amfiteatrov catered for the general reader whose taste he knew to perfection" (Cassell's Encyclopaedia of World Literature, ed. S.H. Steinberg, p. 1680).

In 1916 Amfiteatrov returned to the Russian Empire and became editor of the nationalist newspaper Russkaya volya. Because of his attacks on the government he was sent into exile in Irkutsk at the beginning of 1917, but after the February Revolution he returned to Petrograd, where he edited a Cossack newspaper and wrote articles attacking the Bolsheviks until the latter ended freedom of the press, whereupon he became a teacher and translator. He left Russia with his family in August 1921. Until the spring of 1922 he lived in Prague, then settled in Italy, where he wrote for many émigré journals.

Amfiteatrov died in Levanto, Italy, in 1938. His sons were Vladimir Amfiteatrov-Kadashev, a writer and journalist (and a friend of Vladimir Nabokov); Daniil, a composer; and the musicians, Maksim and Roman Amfiteatrov.

== English translations ==
- "Napoleonder (Folk Tale)", from Folk Tales of Napoleon: The Napoleon of the People and Napoleonder, The Outlook Company, NY, 1902. Translated by George Kennan.
- "He" and "The Cimmerian Disease", from White Magic: Russian Emigre Tales of Mystery and Terror, Russian Life Books, Montpelier, VT, 2021. Translated by Muireann Maguire.

== See also ==
- Fragments Magazine
