= Daniele Amfitheatrof =

Russian, American, and Italian composer (1901–1983)

- Даниил Амфитеатров
- Born: 29 October 1901; St. Petersburg, Russian Empire
- Died: 4 June 1983 (aged 81); Rome, Italy
- Father: Alexander Amfiteatrov
- Relatives: Maksim Amfiteatrov (brother); Nikolay Sokolov (grandfather)

Daniele Alexandrovich Amfitheatrof (Russian: Даниил Александрович Амфитеатров, 29 October 1901 – 4 June 1983) was a Russian, American, and Italian composer and conductor.

== Biography ==
Amfitheatrof was born in Saint Petersburg, Russia on 29 October 1901; his grandfather was Nikolay Sokolov.

In his youth, Amfitheatrof studied first with Jāzeps Vītols at the Saint Petersburg Conservatory, then Jaroslav Křička in Prague. Most of Amfitheatrof's studies took place in Rome, where he completed his studies in composition at the Conservatorio di Santa Cecilia under Ottorino Respighi. Amfitheatrof also graduated in organ playing from the Pontifical Institute of Sacred Music.

His career began as a répétiteur at the Teatro Augusteo, where he eventually became assistant conductor to Bernardino Molinari. After obtaining a number of positions in Italy, including house conductor and manager at the EIAR station in Turin, Amfitheatrof left to become associate conductor of the Minneapolis Symphony Orchestra under music director Dimitri Mitropoulos.

In 1939, Amfitheatrof relocated to Hollywood, California, where he established himself as a film composer. He became a naturalized American citizen in 1944. Altogether, Amfitheatrof scored more than seventy films.

With World War II imminent in Europe, Amfitheatrof elected to remain in the United States. He relocated his family to California on the recommendation of Boris Morros, then director of music at Paramount Pictures. Amfitheatrof was hired by Metro-Goldwyn-Mayer Studios under an exclusive four-year contract (1939–1943). His scores at MGM include those for Lassie Come Home, the first major film of a young Elizabeth Taylor. During his twenty-six years in Hollywood, where he was employed by each of the major studios at one time or another, he composed the scores (often uncredited) for over 50 films, including Letter from an Unknown Woman, The Desert Fox, The Naked Jungle, The Last Hunt, and The Mountain. His final score was written for Major Dundee in 1965. (This score, which was disliked by many, including director Sam Peckinpah, was replaced with a new score by Christopher Caliendo for the reconstructed version, which was released theatrically in 2005; both scores can be heard on the DVD, released later that year.)

Amfitheatrof was twice nominated for an Oscar for his work, on Guest Wife and Song of the South. Amfitheatrof once remarked in written correspondence (citation: private letters) with his friend and colleague, John Steven Lasher, that his career in Hollywood "as a prostitute composer" ultimately tarnished his image as a professional musician. As a result, he was unable to secure commissions or performances of his concert works.

=== Death ===
Amfitheatrof died at his home in Rome on 7 June 1983, after a prolonged period of declining health.

== Partial filmography ==
- Lassie Come Home (1943)
- I'll Be Seeing You (1944)
- The Captain from Köpenick (completed in 1941, released in 1945)
- Guest Wife (1945)
- Miss Susie Slagle's (1946)
- The Virginian (1946)
- Song of the South (1946)
- Temptation (1946)
- Suspense (1946)
- The Lost Moment (1947)
- Ivy (1947)
- Time Out of Mind (1947)
- The Senator Was Indiscreet (1947)
- Letter from an Unknown Woman (1948)
- Another Part of the Forest (1948)
- Rogues' Regiment (1948)
- An Act of Murder (1948)
- The Fan (1949)
- The Capture (1950)
- Copper Canyon (1950)
- The Damned Don't Cry! (1950)
- Bird of Paradise (1951)
- Storm Warning (1951)
- The Desert Fox (1951)
- Devil's Canyon (1953)
- The Naked Jungle (1954)
- Human Desire (1954)
- Day of Triumph (1954)
- The Last Hunt (1956)
- The Mountain (1956)
- From Hell to Texas (1958)
- Edge of Eternity (1959)
- Heller in Pink Tights (1960)
- Major Dundee (1965)
