= Severov =

Severov (Russian: Северов) is a Russian surname. Notable people with the surname include:

- Aleksandr Severov (1889–?), Russian wrestler
- Sergei Severov, Soviet-Russian footballer
- Nikolai Severov, Soviet-Russian architect
- Aleksandr Valentinovich Severov, Soviet-Russian criminal
