= Krasnoye Pole =

Krasnoye Pole Красное Поле
- Village
- Location within Vologda Oblast Location within Russia
- Coordinates: 60°46′N 46°14′E
- Country: Russia
- Region: Vologda Oblast
- District: Velikoustyugsky District
- Time zone: UTC+3:00

Krasnoye Pole (Russian: Красное Поле) is a rural locality (a village) in Mardengskoye Rural Settlement, Velikoustyugsky District, Vologda Oblast, Russia. The population was 38 as of 2002. There are 9 streets.

== Geography ==
Krasnoye Pole is located 5 km northwest of Veliky Ustyug (the district's administrative centre) by road. Veliky Ustyug is the nearest rural locality.
