= Palo Alto Chamber Orchestra =

Youth chamber orchestra based in Palo Alto, California

- Youth orchestra
- Short name: PACO
- Founded: 1966, by William Whitson
- Location: Palo Alto, California, U.S.
- Music director: Scott Krijnen
- Website: www.pacomusic.org

The Palo Alto Chamber Orchestra (PACO) is a youth chamber orchestra based in Palo Alto, California. The emphasis on chamber music sets it apart from other youth orchestras. The orchestra is made up of five ensembles (SuperStrings, Preparatory, Debut, Sinfonia, and Senior) of about 25 members each, who rehearse weekly and perform throughout the year. PACO also conducts international tours with the Senior PACO ensemble occasionally.

== History ==
The Palo Alto Chamber Orchestra (PACO) was founded in 1966 by violinist William Whitson, who served as its music director for 36 years until his untimely death at the age of 62 in 2001. During his long tenure as music director, Whitson conducted PACO on many international tours throughout the world, performing in Canada (1967), the West Indies (1969), the North Western U.S. (1971, 1976), Europe (1974, 1984, 1986, 1992, 1996), Australia (1988), the Soviet Union (1990) and China and South Korea (1994). Over a 30-year span, PACO also hosted the Palo Alto Twilight Concerts and A Bach Celebration!. The former was a weekly summer series and the latter a weekly spring series founded by Whitson as performance outlets to feature PACO's many alums turned successful professional musicians. PACO annually held an Ashland Tour, established in 1971 by Whitson, as the featured guest orchestra performing on the outdoor Elizabethan Stage at the renowned Oregon Shakespeare Festival.

In 2022, violist Benjamin Simon stepped down after a twenty-year tenure as music director with PACO. Cellist Scott Krijnen became the orchestra's third musical director in 2023.
