= Levanto, Liguria =

Levanto Lievanto (Ligurian)
- Comune
- Comune di Levanto
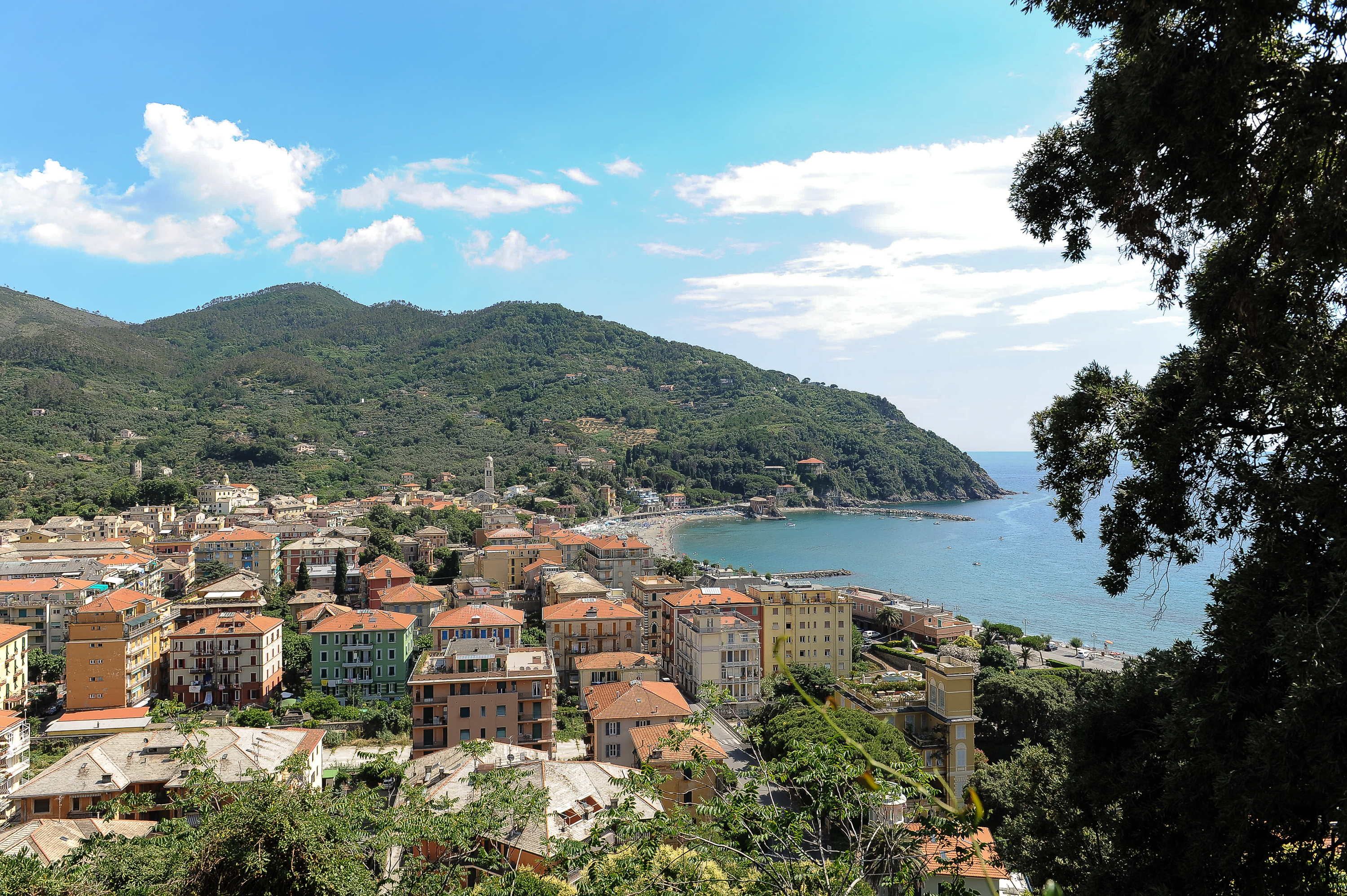

- Coat of arms

- Location within Italy Location within Liguria
- Coordinates: 44°10′N 9°37′E
- Country: Italy
- Region: Liguria
- Province: La Spezia (SP)
- Frazioni: Lizza, Lavaggiorosso, Dosso, Groppo, Montale, Vignana, Lerici, Pastine, Chiesanuova, Fontona, Legnaro, Fossato, Ridarolo

Government
  - Mayor: Maurizio Moggia

Area
  - Total: 36.81 km^{2} (14.21 sq mi)
- Elevation: 4 m (13 ft)

Population (2025)
  - Total: 5,048
  - Density: 137.1/km^{2} (355.2/sq mi)
- Demonym: Levantesi
- Time zone: UTC+1 (CET)
  - Summer (DST): UTC+2 (CEST)
- Postal code: 19015
- Dialing code: 0187
- Website: Official website

Levanto (Italian: [ˈlɛːvanto]; Ligurian: Lévanto [ˈlevaŋtu] or Levanto [leˈvaŋtu], locally Lievanto [ljeˈvaŋtu]) is a town and municipality in the province of La Spezia, in the region of Liguria in Italy, almost 90 kilometres (56 mi) southeast of Genoa and about 20 kilometres (12 mi) northwest of La Spezia. It has a population of 5,048.

The town is on the coast at the mouth of a river valley, between hills thickly wooded with olive and pine trees. The ridges on either side of the valley thrust out into the sea as the headlands of Mesco and Levanto. The municipality forms part of the coastal district known as the Comunità Montana della Riviera Spezzina, and part of its territory is included in the Cinque Terre National Park.

== History ==
In Roman times there was a small settlement there by the name of Ceula, an important nodal point due to its location and harbour. At the beginning of the 9th century, the bell tower of the present church, the Chiesa di San Siro, served as a watchtower and as a defence against dangers from the sea. Beginning the 13th century, the area's importance began to decline—to the advantage of Levanto, which was expanding by the sea.

Levanto first became the feudal stronghold of the Malaspina before passing to the Da Passano and then, in 1229, to the Republic of Genoa. In the Middle Ages, the village became a centre of commercial activity, benefiting from maritime and overland travel, the most important of the latter routes being the Via Francigena, the ancient pilgrims' way that in medieval times connected Canterbury to Rome. In the post-Medieval period, the village saw major development with the construction of the Borgo Nuovo or Stagno, largely completed by the 17th century, on the plain of the small river Ghiararo. This area is characterised by painted 17th- and 18th-century houses, some built on much earlier buildings. A further phase of urban development took place at the turn of the 20th century with the opening of two new thoroughfares, the Corso Italia and Corso Roma. Beginning in 1950, the village experienced further growth, culminating during the 1970s in the present townscape.

== Demographics ==
As of 2025, Levanto has a population of 5,048, of whom 47.3% are male and 52.7% are female. Minors make up 11.8% of the population, and seniors make up 32.2%, compared to the Italian average of 14.9% and 24.7% respectively.

Historical population

Year	Pop.	±%
1861	4,643	—
1871	4,483	−3.4%
1881	4,482	−0.0%
1901	4,874	+8.7%
1911	5,164	+5.9%
1921	5,525	+7.0%
1931	5,778	+4.6%
1936	5,968	+3.3%

Year	Pop.	±%
1951	6,152	+3.1%
1961	6,257	+1.7%
1971	6,599	+5.5%
1981	6,447	−2.3%
1991	5,925	−8.1%
2001	5,641	−4.8%
2011	5,509	−2.3%
2021	5,218	−5.3%

Source: ISTAT

== Main sights ==
- Medieval castle, built to defend the village and still in a state of perfect conservation. Privately owned and not open to the public.
- Church of Sant'Andrea (Church of Saint Andrew). An example of 13th-century Ligurian Gothic style with its façade decorated in black and white stripes, and a magnificent rose window surmounting the main door. The chalice of emperor Henry VII is one of its treasures, displayed only on special occasions, such as the festival of the patron saint.
- Church of Santa Maria della Costa (Church of Saint Mary of the Coast). Pre-13th century.
- Villa Agnelli. Its gardens were landscaped at the beginning of the 20th century. Privately owned and not open to the public.
- Piazza della Loggia, characterised by a 13th-century loggia, which in 2007 received from UNESCO the title of "monument being evidence of culture and peace".
- Piazza Cavour, in earlier times the inner courtyard of the Monastero delle Ordine di Santa Chiara (Monastery of the Order of St Clare, the Poor Clares), dating from the 16th century. It now contains the town hall, the small public library, and other municipal offices.
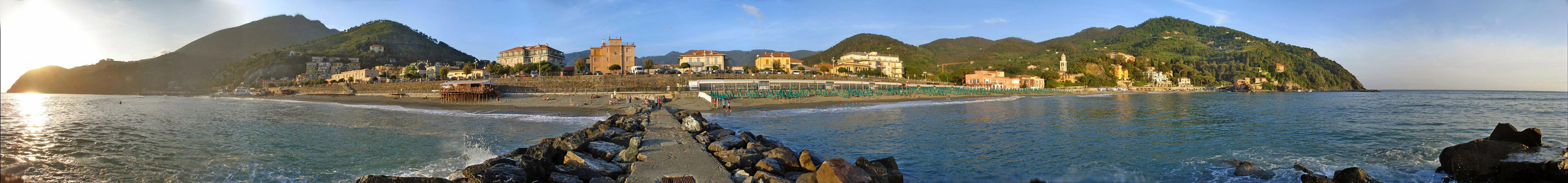
Levanto

== Culture ==
Permanent exhibition of cultural artefacts, in a 14th-century building attached to hostel Ospitalia del Mare.

== Festivals ==
- Amfiteatrof Music Festival: classical and chamber music festival dedicated to Russian-born cellist Massimo Amfiteatrof, in June/July – September
- Festa di San Giacomo (Feast of St James) and Festa del Mare (Festival of the Sea), 24–25 July
- Festa di Nostra Signora della Guardia: traditional band concert, 29 August
- Sagra del Gattafin (fried pastry stuffed with beets, onions, egg and grated cheese), in June
- Festa Madonna del Soccorso, 1–2 July in Fontona (a little village near Levanto)

== Transport ==
Levanto station is a stop on the Genoa–Pisa railway, and the westernmost station for tourist trains serving the villages of the Cinque Terre.
