= 16th-century Western domes =

Aspect of architectural history

Domes built in the 16th century by the Western world, broadly defined, relied primarily on empirical techniques and oral traditions rather than the architectural treatises of the time. The use of lantern towers, or timburios, which hid dome profiles on the exterior declined in Italy as the use of windowed drums beneath domes increased, which introduced new structural difficulties.

Multi-story spires with truncated bulbous cupolas supporting smaller cupolas or crowns were used at the top of important 16th-century spires, beginning in the Netherlands. In the early sixteenth century, the lantern of the Italian dome had spread north and this structure gradually adopted the bulbous cupola from the Netherlands. The fully developed onion dome was prominent in Prague by the middle of the sixteenth century and appeared widely on royal residences. Russian architecture strongly influenced the many bulbous domes of the wooden churches of Bohemia and Silesia. Bulbous domes in Bavarian rural architecture less resemble Dutch models than Russian ones, due to influence through Bohemia and Silesia.

The Gothic ribbed vault was displaced with a combination of dome and barrel vaults in the Renaissance style throughout the 16th century, beginning with the areas of Italy within Florence's sphere of influence and with Bramante's 1505–6 projects for a wholly new St. Peter's Basilica in Rome. The spread of domes in this style outside of Italy began with central Europe, although there was often a stylistic delay of a century or two. Use of the oval dome spread quickly through Italy, Spain, France, and central Europe and would become characteristic of Counter-Reformation architecture in the Baroque style.

A more somber style was implemented following the reforms of the Council of Trent. The extradosed domes of El Escorial became a model for subsequent Spanish domes. Only a few examples of domed churches from the 16th century survive from the Spanish colonization of Mexico. Surviving examples are typically on a Latin cross plan with a brick dome on a drum at the crossing. Early domes were commonly hemispherical and low, springing from the level of the roofline, rather than using an intervening drum.

== Developments ==
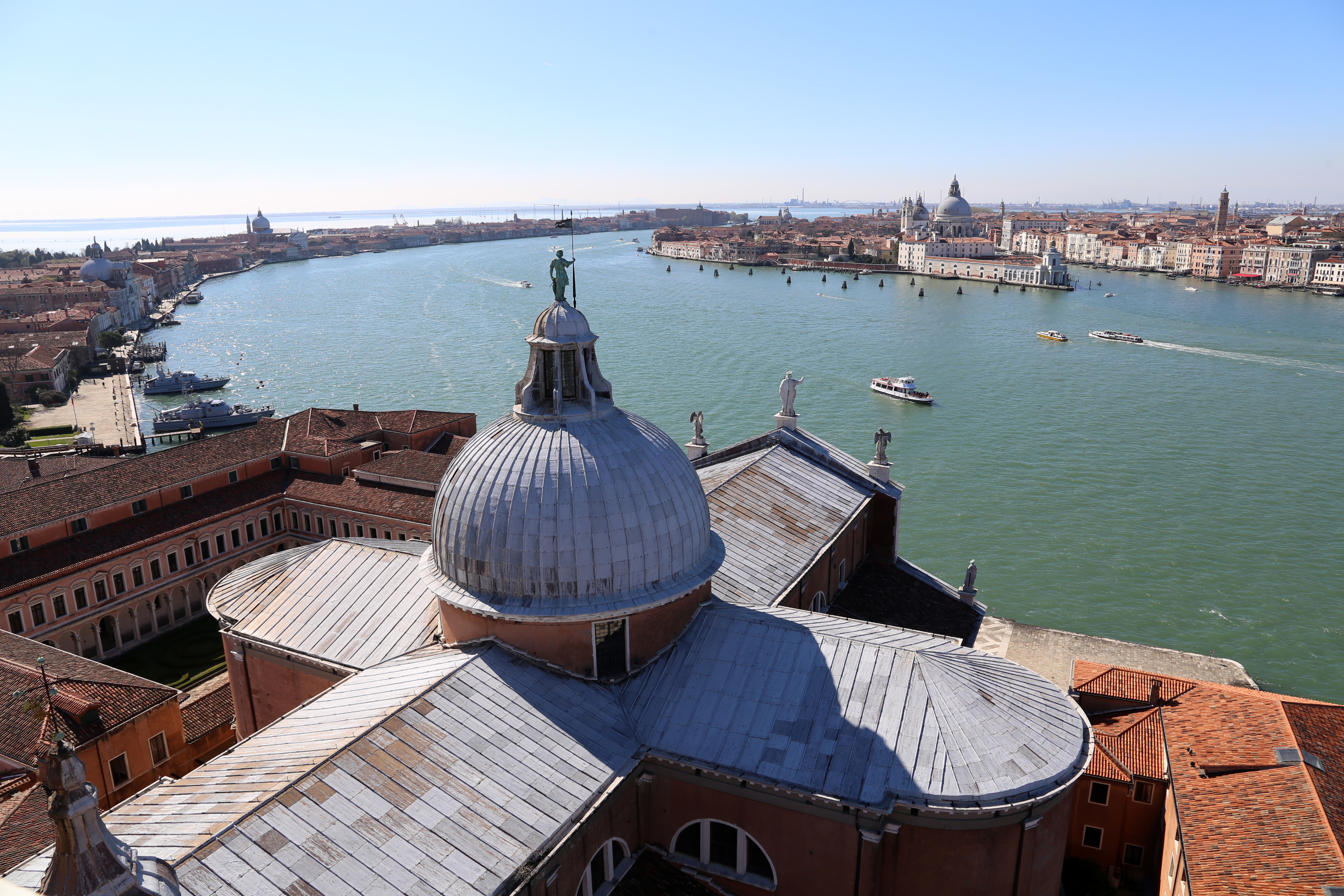
Domes of Venice, with San Giorgio Maggiore at front

A combination of barrel vaults, pendentives, drum, and dome developed as the characteristic structural forms of large Renaissance churches following a period of innovation in the later fifteenth century. Florence was the first Italian city to develop the new style, followed by Rome, and then Venice. Domes in the Renaissance style in Florence are mostly from the early period, in the fifteenth century. Cities within Florence's zone of influence, such as Genoa, Milan, and Turin, mainly produced examples later, from the sixteenth century on.

The construction of domes in the sixteenth century relied primarily on empirical techniques and oral traditions rather than the architectural treatises of the times, which avoided practical details. This was adequate for domes up to medium size, with diameters in the range of 12 to 20 meters. Materials were considered homogeneous and rigid, with compression taken into account and elasticity ignored. The weight of materials and the size of the dome were the key references. Lateral tensions in a dome were counteracted with horizontal rings of iron, stone, or wood incorporated into the structure. Other techniques used to reduce lateral thrust were to add a buttress at the base, a counterweight above the abutment, or to give the vault a steeper profile. Architects followed authoritative opinions, especially those of ancient authors, and the evidence from ancient and contemporary buildings. The structural behavior of previous domed buildings acted as full-scale models to inform new ones and small scale models of new projects were also relied upon.

Dome design prior to the seventeenth century relied upon geometrical and proportional construction rules established by the experiences of prior centuries. Principles based on material strengths, the theory of elasticity, and limit analysis had not yet been formulated. Traditional geometric rules of proportion for domes were applied by master builders regardless of size, but helped new domes be built in forms known to be safe. Sizing of domes was determined geometrically through ratios of the diameter to other aspects, such as thickness, lantern size, and drum size, until it was replaced by analytical calculations at the end of the seventeenth century.

Onion-shaped domes appeared widely on royal residences in the middle of the sixteenth century. In addition to those on the eastern part of Prague Castle, royal residences in Madrid, London, Vienna, and Kraków had them, always as part of Italian classical forms.

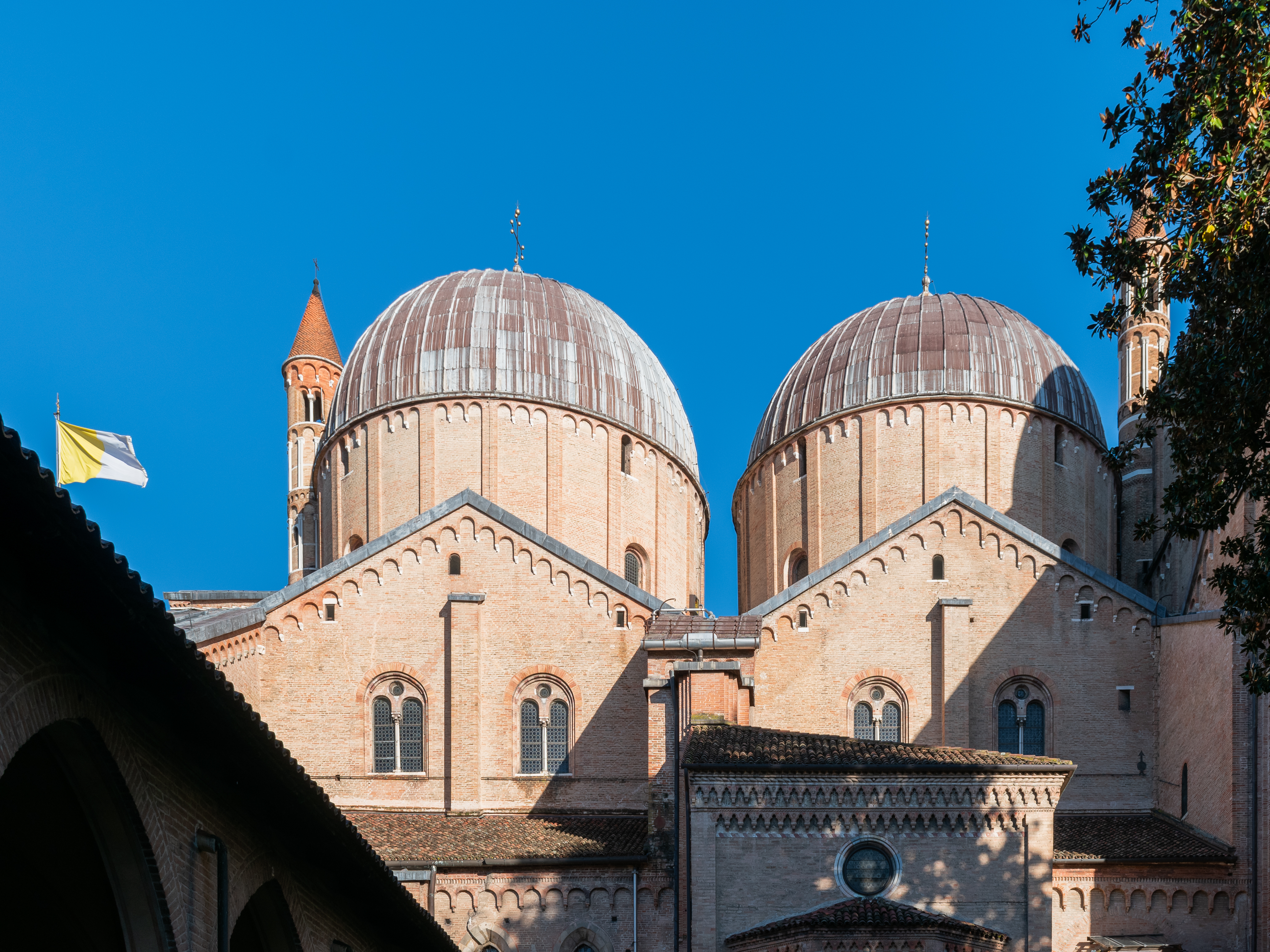
Domes of the Saint Anthony of Padua Basilica, known locally as "il Santo"

The first rotating observatory dome was built in the sixteenth century, in Kassel.

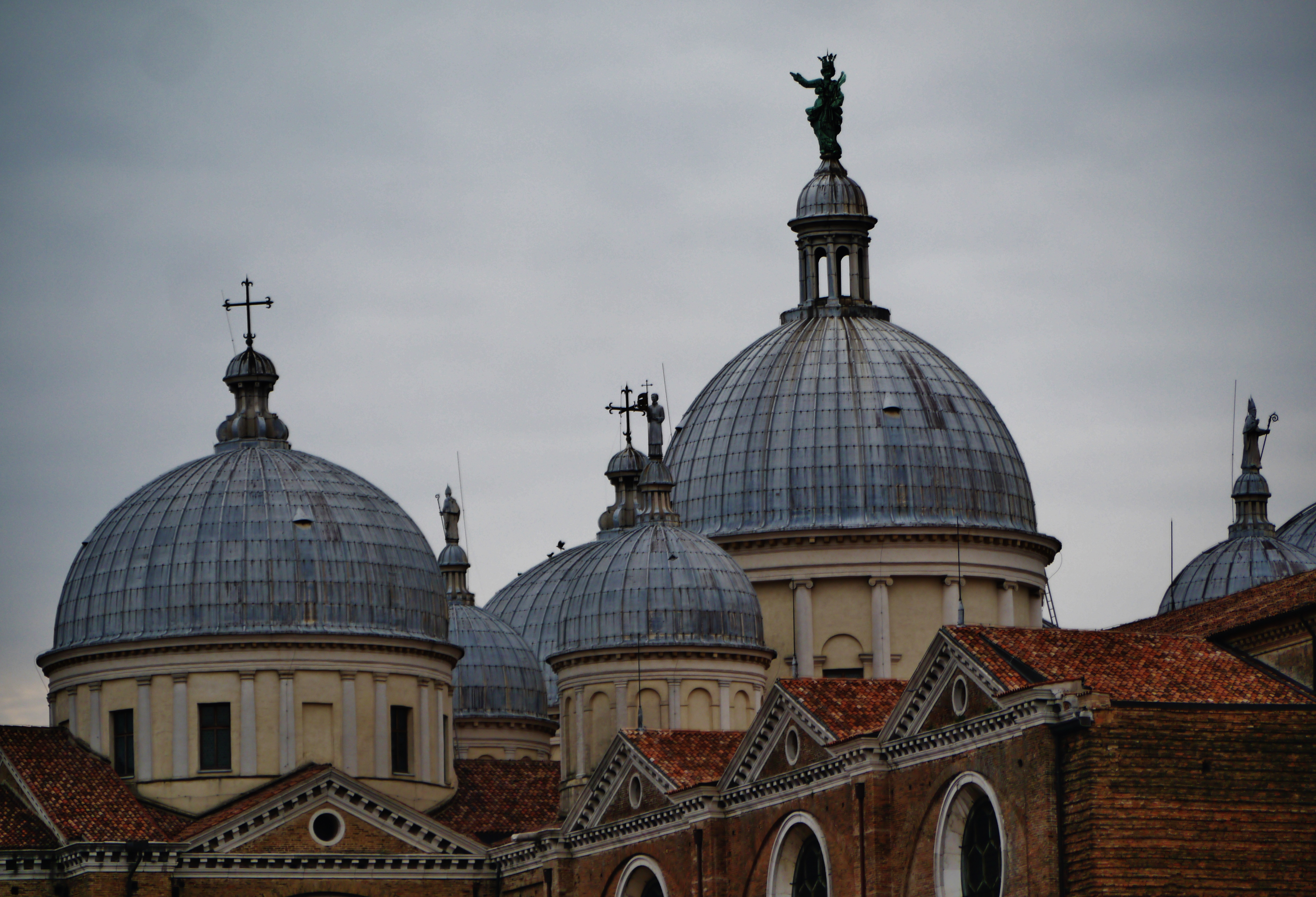
Domes of the Abbey of Santa Giustina in Padua

Toward the end of the sixteenth century, transepts with domes were popular in several Italian states and were featured in prominent churches such as the Abbey of Santa Giustina in Padua (begun in 1532), Mantua Cathedral (added after 1540), Church of the Gesù in Rome (1568–1580), and San Giorgio Maggiore in Venice (begun in 1566). The domes of the Abbey of Santa Giustina in Padua may have been inspired by those of il Santo. Between the late sixteenth and mid-seventeenth centuries, the use of iron chains was considered critical in achieving structural equilibrium for dome construction in the area around Rome, with rare exceptions. Other contemporary architects, such as those in Florence, argued that dome stability should instead be ensured by the use of correct proportions and good construction.

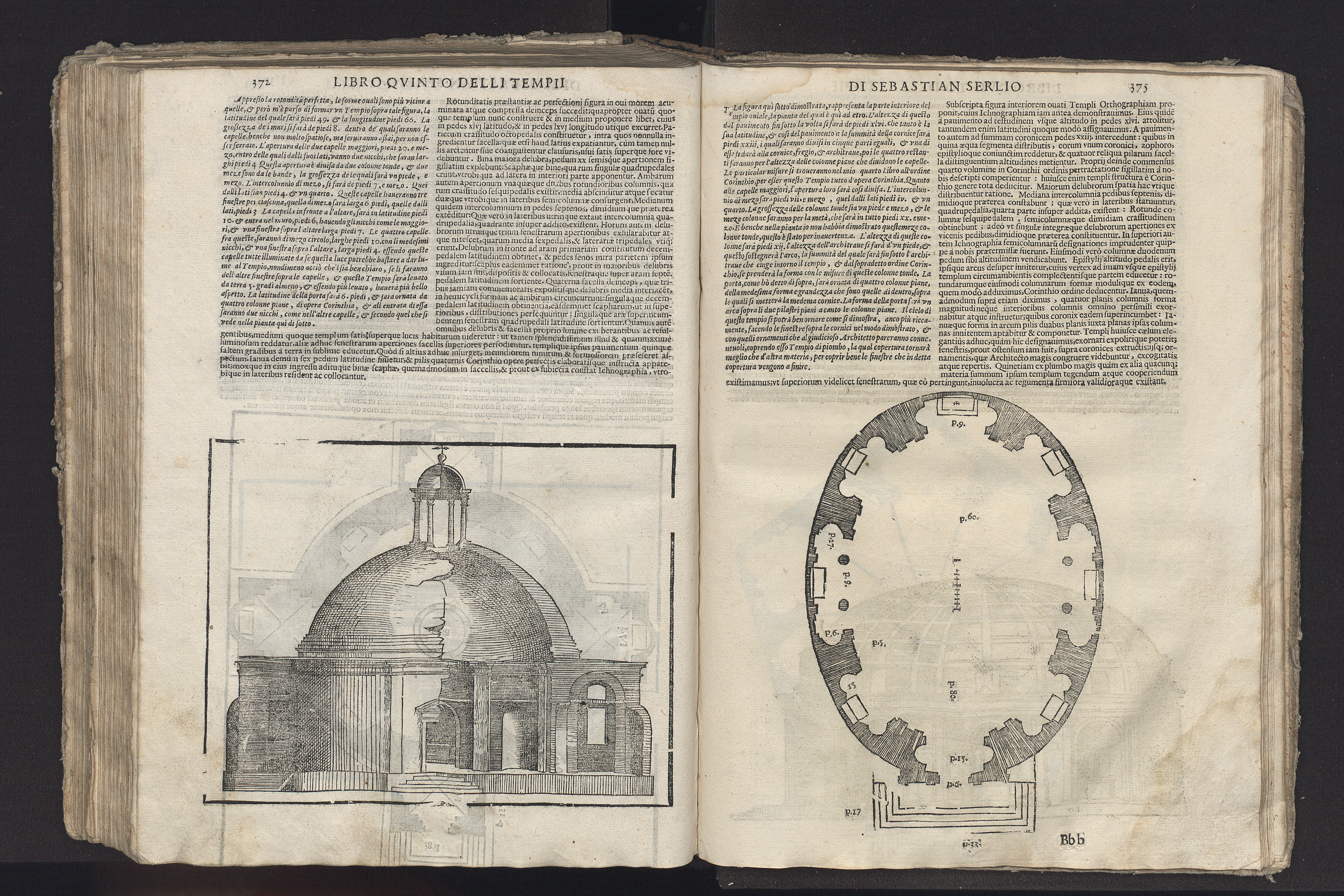
Book Five of Sebastiano Serlio's treatise

In the sixteenth century, many Renaissance and Baroque elliptical and oval plan domes were built over rectangular naves, using brick in Italy and stone in Spain. Later German oval domes in the Rococo style used different combinations of geometry. Elliptical dome traces were published by Durero (1525), Serlio (1545), and De L'Orme (1561) along with practical methods of achieving the shape using circular arcs, the technique used from the time of the ancient Romans. The publication of Sebastiano Serlio's treatise, one of the most popular architectural treatises ever published, was responsible for the spread of the oval in late Renaissance and Baroque architecture. Book I (1545), on geometry, included techniques to create ovals, and Book V (1547), on architecture, included a design for an oval church. Churches with oval plans begin to be built in the middle of the sixteenth century. Churches with oval domes allowed for a synthesis of the two fundamental church types, longitudinal and central plan, and would become characteristic of Baroque architecture and the Counter-Reformation. Alonso de Vandelvira published a description of the geometry of oval domes around 1580 with orthogonal projections of meridian and parallel rib curves. Oval domes often incorporated both elliptical and oval or semicircular curves and this ambiguity is reflected in the architectural literature. Builders relied on graphical or empirical solutions to such geometric problems.

== Papal States ==
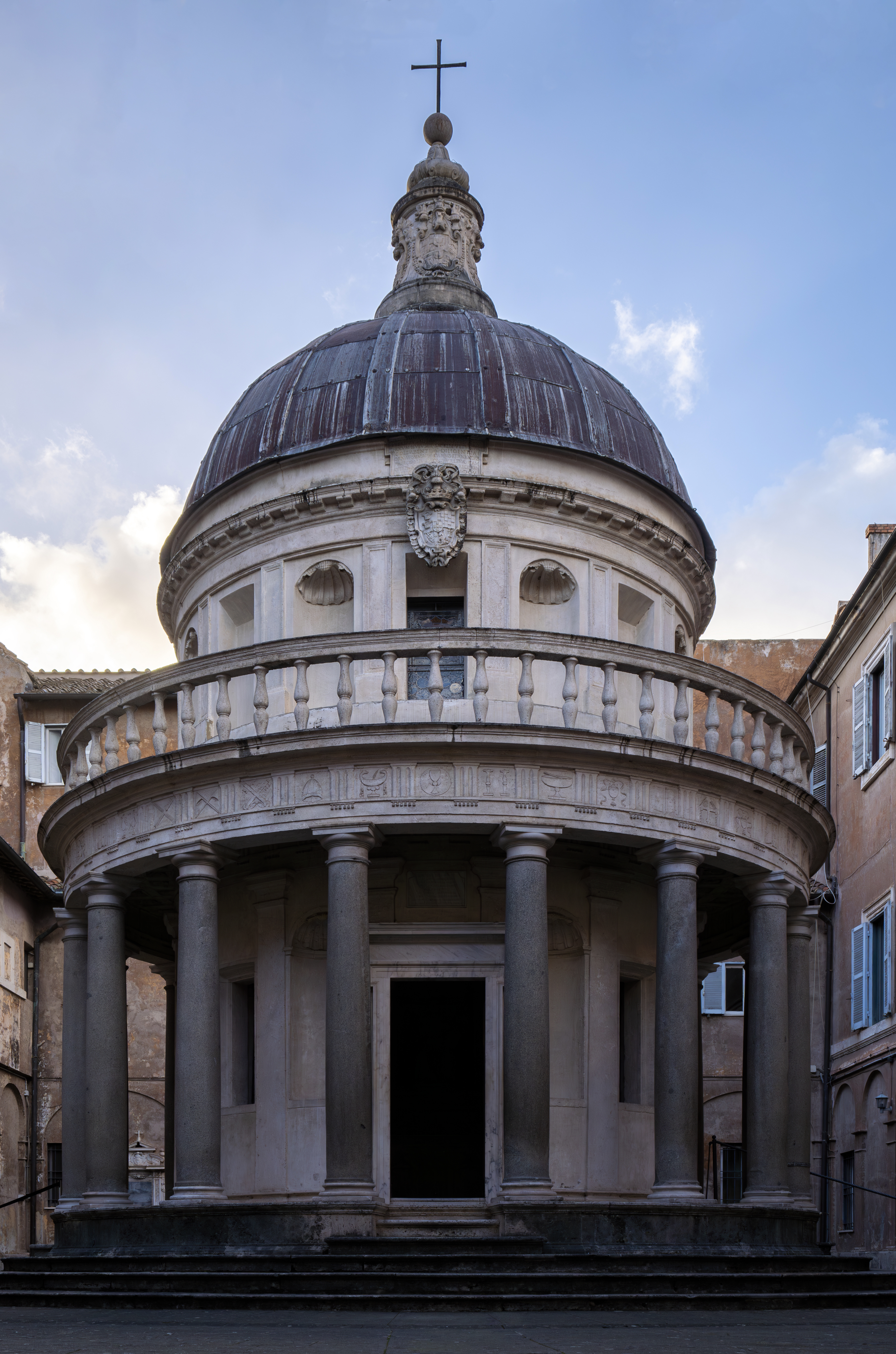
The Tempietto in Rome

The Tempietto in Rome, a small domed building modelled on the Temple of Vesta, was built in 1502 by Bramante in the cloister of San Pietro in Montorio to commemorate the site of St. Peter's martyrdom. It has inspired numerous copies and adaptations since, including Radcliffe Camera, the mausoleum at Castle Howard, and the domes of St. Peter's Basilica, St Paul's Cathedral, the Panthéon, and the U.S. Capitol.

Bramante's 1505–6 projects for a wholly new St. Peter's Basilica mark the beginning of the displacement of the Gothic ribbed vault with the combination of dome and barrel vault, which proceeded throughout the sixteenth century. Bramante's studies for new church designs for St. Peter's coincided with Leonardo da Vinci's studies of centrally planned churches while they were both at the court of Ludovico Sforza in Milan and they may have collaborated. Their studies may have influenced many of the centrally planned churches built in the first half of the sixteenth century, such as the church of Santa Maria della Consolazione (started around 1508) and the church of the Madonna di San Biagio at Montepulciano (1518–1545). Bramante's cross-domed design for the church of St. Celso in Rome served as a model for the Church of St. Maria della Fortezze in Viterbo, begun in 1514. Although Bramante designed a low dome like that of the Pantheon for the church of Santa Maria della Consolazione in Todi, a building ordered by the ruling Atti family to mark the site of a 1508 miracle, the design changed in 1587 to a dome and drum on pendentives.

Raphael's dome in the Chigi Chapel (1516) at the basilica of Santa Maria del Popolo use stucco relief moldings to frame eight picture panels surrounding a central circular image. The eight panels depict angels and figures representing the planets. The central panel depicts an illusionistic Pantocrator mosaic, with a perspective intended to be seen from the entrance arch.

In 1520, Antonio da Correggio painted the oval crossing dome of San Giovanni Evangelista in Parma, using an illusionistic style that depicts a central Christ, but in a scene of the second coming, rather than as Pantocrator. The low lighting required the painting to use a "fresco technique with a far stronger tonal range than is normal for the medium." In 1526 he painted the octagonal crossing dome of Parma Cathedral with an illusionistic depiction of the assumption of Mary, with plaster filling in the angles of the octagonal vault to create a smooth surface. The image is meant to be viewed at or near the base of the steps to the chancel.

The church of Santa Maria di Loreto in Rome (1507-1585) has a dome in two shells. The inner shell was built by Antonio Sangallo with the rest of the church, but the outer shell was added later by Giacomo del Duca and finished in 1577. A false lantern was added above this second shell in 1585.

The Sanctuary of Our Lady of Mongiovino (begun 1513) by Rocco da Vicenza was a cross-domed church that followed the Venetian model. Alessio Tramello helped develop a Lombard variant of the cross-domed plan in which the cross arms extend past the otherwise square plan with his church of Santa Maria di Campagna in Piacenza (1522–1528).

The first church with an oval dome in the Renaissance period was the Sant'Andrea in Via Flaminia, built from 1550 to 1554 by Vignola. Use of the oval dome subsequently spread quickly through Italy, Spain, France, and central Europe. The church of Sant'Anna dei Palafrenieri (c. 1568–1575), designed by Vignola and completed by his son Giacinto Barozzi, was the first church to have an oval dome over an oval plan.

Many Italian examples of oval domes have semi-circular cross sections, which allowed for easier construction using semi-circular transverse centering. Vignola's oval plan church of Sant'Anna dei Palafrenieri was the first to be built within Rome, and was designed in 1572 with seven windows between the eight ribs in its oval dome. The windows introduced structural complications that Vignola had avoided in his first oval dome over the rectangular plan church of Sant'Andrea in Via Flaminia, but the restrictions of the site necessitated light from above. The oval plan church of San Giacomo degli Incurabili was started in 1592 by a student of Vignola's, Francesco Capriani, and finished by Carlo Maderno. It also has ribs between the six windows in its dome, but they are concealed on the interior. The design of this church would inspire others over the next two centuries, aided by the building activity of the many new religious orders founded between 1524 and 1621.

=== St. Peter's Basilica ===
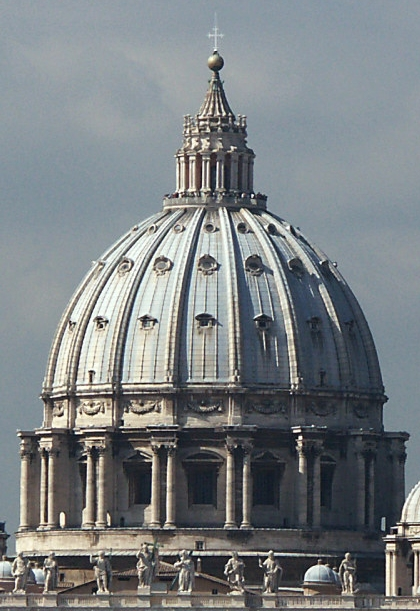
St. Peter's Basilica in Vatican City

Bramante's initial design for the rebuilding of St. Peter's Basilica was a Greek cross plan with a large central hemispherical dome and four smaller domes around it in a quincunx pattern. Work began in 1506 and continued under a succession of builders over the next 120 years. Bramante's project for St. Peter's marks the beginning of the displacement of the Gothic ribbed vault with the combination of dome and barrel vault. Although basilicas with domed crossings were common in Italy at this time, they were not common in the city of Rome, which followed the Constantinian basilica model. Bramante is said to have likened his design to placing the Pantheon on top of the Basilica of Constantine, although this appears to be apocryphal. Proposed inspirations for Bramante's plan have ranged from some sketches of Leonardo da Vinci to the Byzantine quincunx church and the dome of Milan's Basilica of San Lorenzo. Bramante sketched San Lorenzo during his time as court architect in Milan and his design for St. Peters includes elements from San Lorenzo, such as the apse structure, central dome modeled on the Pantheon, and corner towers. The triangular sections of the piers of the crossing dome imitate those supporting the dome of Florence Cathedral. He expanded the crossing bay beneath the dome into an octagonal shape. The four massive central piers and the arches linking them were completed by 1512, but cracking in the arches was detected between 1514 and 1534, possibly due to settling. The two eastern piers rest on solid marl and clay, while the other two rest upon remains of earlier Roman construction. That the piers and arches were left to stand with incomplete buttressing while construction stopped for over 30 years was also a factor. The plan for St. Peters was a model for Baldassare Peruzzi when planning Carpi Cathedral (begun 1515).

Michelangelo inherited the project to design the dome of St. Peter's basilica in 1546. It had previously been in the hands of Bramante (with Giuliano da Sangallo and Fra Giovanni Giocondo) until 1514, Raphael Sanzio (assisted by Giuliano da Sangallo and Fra Giovanni Giocondo) until 1520, and Antonio da Sangallo the Younger (with Baldassare Peruzzi), whose work was disrupted by the sack of Rome in 1527. The dome design had been altered by Giuliano da Sangallo from being hemispherical to being 9 meters taller, segmental, and ribbed, and he had strengthened the piers and completed building the pendentives.

Michelangelo redesigned the dome to have two shells, a mostly brick internal structure, and three iron chains to resist outward pressure. His dome was a lower, hemispherical design. He further strengthened the piers by eliminating niches in them and the internal spiral staircase. Michelangelo obtained a decree from Pope Julius III that threatened an interdiction against anyone who altered his design, completed construction of the base for the drum by May 1558, and spent November 1558 to December 1561 creating a detailed wooden model. Construction of the drum was completed a few months after he died in 1564. Sixteen pairs of columns project out between sixteen windows in the drum to act as buttresses, and are aligned with the sixteen ribs of the dome and the paired columns of the lantern. The drum and buttresses were built of stone with rubble infill and four internal spiral staircases were included. An artist and sculptor, rather than an engineer, Michelangelo did not create full engineering plans for the dome and his model lacked construction details. The dome of St. Peter's Basilica was later built by Giacomo della Porta and Domenico Fontana.

Pope Sixtus V appointed Giacomo della Porta and Domenico Fontana in 1588 to begin construction of the dome to Michelangelo's model. They made modifications to his design estimated to have reduced the tensile stresses in the dome by 40%, including thinning the two shells near the top, reducing the thickness and exterior projection of the ribs, raising the springing line by 4.8 meters, and changing the shape of the dome. Giacomo della Porta insisted on a vertically elliptical profile for the dome of St. Peter's Basilica, for structural reasons, and construction began in June 1588. Unlike the dome of Florence Cathedral, centring was used during construction. The dome was built with brick and two wrought iron eyebar chains were incorporated into the lower part of it during construction. The dome was completed up to the base of the lantern in May 1590, a few months before the death of Pope Sixtus V. The lantern and lead covering for the dome were completed later, with the brass orb and cross being raised in 1592.

The lantern is 17 meters high and the dome is 136.57 meters from the base to the top of the cross. The ogival dome was built with 16 ribs and an inner diameter of 42.7 meters. It begins above the drum and attico (the decorative strip above the drum), which are about 18 meters tall. The two brick shells of the dome are each about 1.19 meters thick at the base. Because the shells separate from each other as they rise, the dome is 2.7 meters thick overall. The sixteen ribs connect the two shells together and are made of stone.

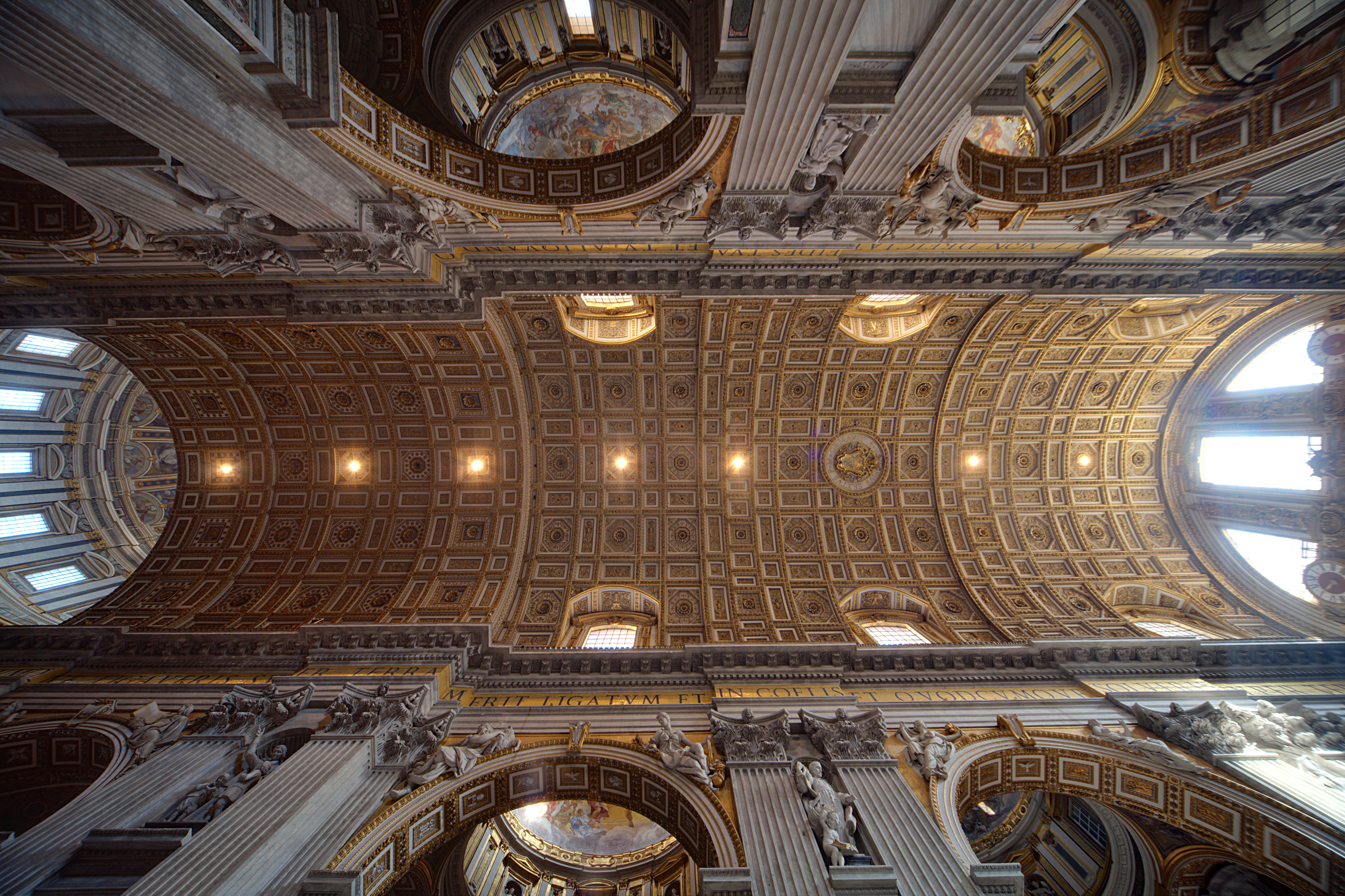
St. Peter's nave with aisle domes

Carlo Maderno's extended nave for St. Peter's Basilica, built between 1609 and 1614, included bays covered by oval domes with lanterns.

Cracks in the crossing dome were noticed as early as 1603, when the mosaics covering the dome interior were completed, and additional cracks were recorded after 1631 and in 1742, demonstrating progression. A 1730 earthquake had spurred closer monitoring of the cracks and the responsible architect, Luigi Vanvitelli, recommended strengthening measures in his 1742 report. Pope Benedict XIV commissioned an independent report from three leading mathematicians from the University of Rome (François Jacquier, Thomas Le Seur, and Roger Joseph Boscovich), who reported in January 1743 with recommendations to add chains at the base and cornice of the drum, at the springing level of the dome, mid-way up the dome, and at the base of the lantern. The mathematicians also recommended adding pedestals on top of the drum buttresses. Benedict published the report and commissioned additional reviews, including by Giovanni Poleni of the University of Padua, who used physical models to test the forces at work and ultimately recommended adding all the chains except the one at the base of the lantern. This recommendation was accepted, although a fifth chain at the base of the lantern was added in response to lightning damage and a sixth chain was added to replace the higher of the two original chains, which was found to be broken. The tie rings were added around the dome in 1743–44 by Vanvitelli. The iron chains included in the design to contain the dome's lateral thrust have had to be replaced ten times since it was constructed. Giovanni Poleni's 1748 report on the state of the dome anticipated the safe theorem by stating "explicitly that the stability of a structure can be established unequivocally if it can be shown that the thrust line lies completely within the masonry." His observation of cracks in the outer shell by the ribs has more recently been attributed by computer models to the heavy lantern.

== House of Habsburg and the Holy Roman Empire ==
=== Republic of Florence ===
The Medici Chapel in Florence was designed by Michelangelo and built between 1521 and 1534.

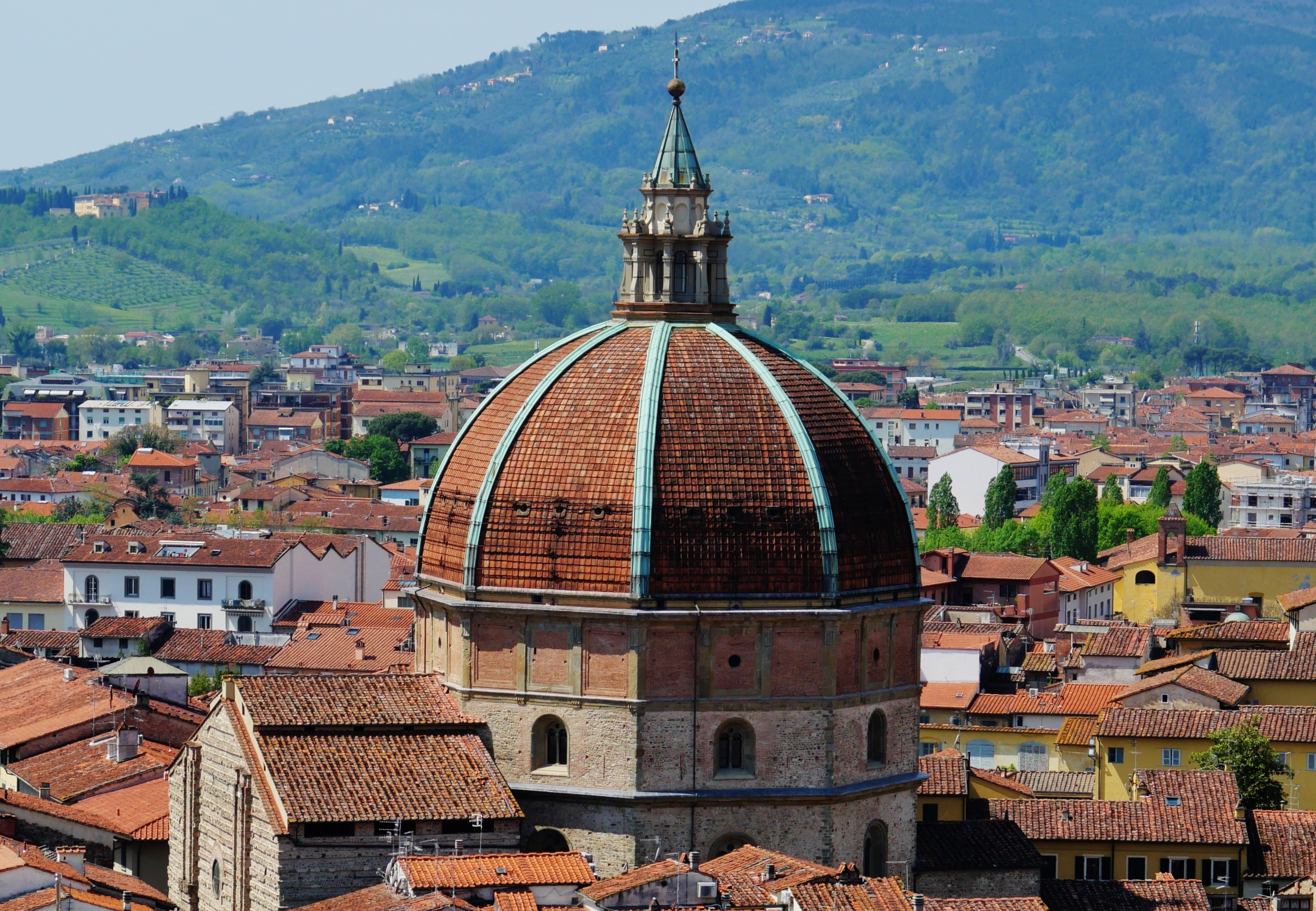
Madonna dell'Umiltà in Pistoia

In 1569, the dome over the church of Madonna dell'Umiltà in Pistoia was completed by Giorgio Vasari at the behest of Cosimo I de' Medici, over a building designed and built by others. Although clearly referencing Florence Cathedral visually and in the use of two shells, structurally the octagonal dome is similar to the much earlier dome of Florence Baptistery and the hemispherical shape of Michelangelo's design for the dome of St. Peter's Basilica. Cracks discovered shortly after completion necessitated the addition by Vasari of iron chains on the inside and outside, but structural problems have continued and additional chains have been added over the centuries, many outside of the dome. The instability has been attributed to Vasari's design. The dome is unique in having its tie-rods visible and "free to vibrate" on the dome's exterior, allowing the stress on the tie-rods to be measured through the frequencies of the vibrations.

Vasari was brought on to build the dome in the mid-1500s and changed the original dome profile from a pointed arch to a hemispherical design, which had larger horizontal thrusts, but the supporting drum was relatively high and weak and no supporting encirclement was used during the dome's construction. The lantern is also relatively heavy: it is 1/8th of the weight of the entire dome, compared to the lantern of Florence Cathedral being 1/25th. Vasari urgently ordered the first iron ring before the dome was finished, then a second immediately after the first was installed in 1575 (or 1570-1572). An additional tie rod ring was placed in 1585, two more in 1592 (one of which was substituted in 1840–1846 after being broken by lightning), one in 1617 after debris fell from cracks in the dome, and two in 1920/1966 after the earthquake of 1917, for a total of seven external rings and one internal ring. The cost of the Renaissance-era tie rods may have been in the same order of magnitude as the cost of the dome itself.

=== March of Montferrat ===
Enrico Bruno, Pope Julius II's secretary and treasurer, had a domed parish church built in his hometown of Roccaverano between 1509 and 1516 that was evidently based on a design by Bramante for the church of St. Celso in Rome.

=== County of Carpi ===
The cross-domed eastern end of the Church of San Nicolò in Carpi (1493–1514) has disputed attribution but may have been designed by Biagio Rossetti.

=== Duchy of Mantua ===
Correggio painted the illusionistic Fall of the Giants in the early 1530s at the Palazzo del Te near Mantua. The corners of the square room and domical vault were filled with plaster to create a smooth uninterrupted surface for the painting, which continues from the dome to the supporting walls.

=== Duchy of Ferrara ===
The Church of San Benedetto in Ferrara (1496–1563) has a cross-domed design on its eastern end by Biagio Rossetti.

=== Republic of Genoa ===
The slender crossing piers of Genoa Cathedral had already been completed when Galeazzo Alessi was awarded the commission to build the crossing dome. That may explain why the dome was a relatively light design, with a single shell and large windows in the thin drum.

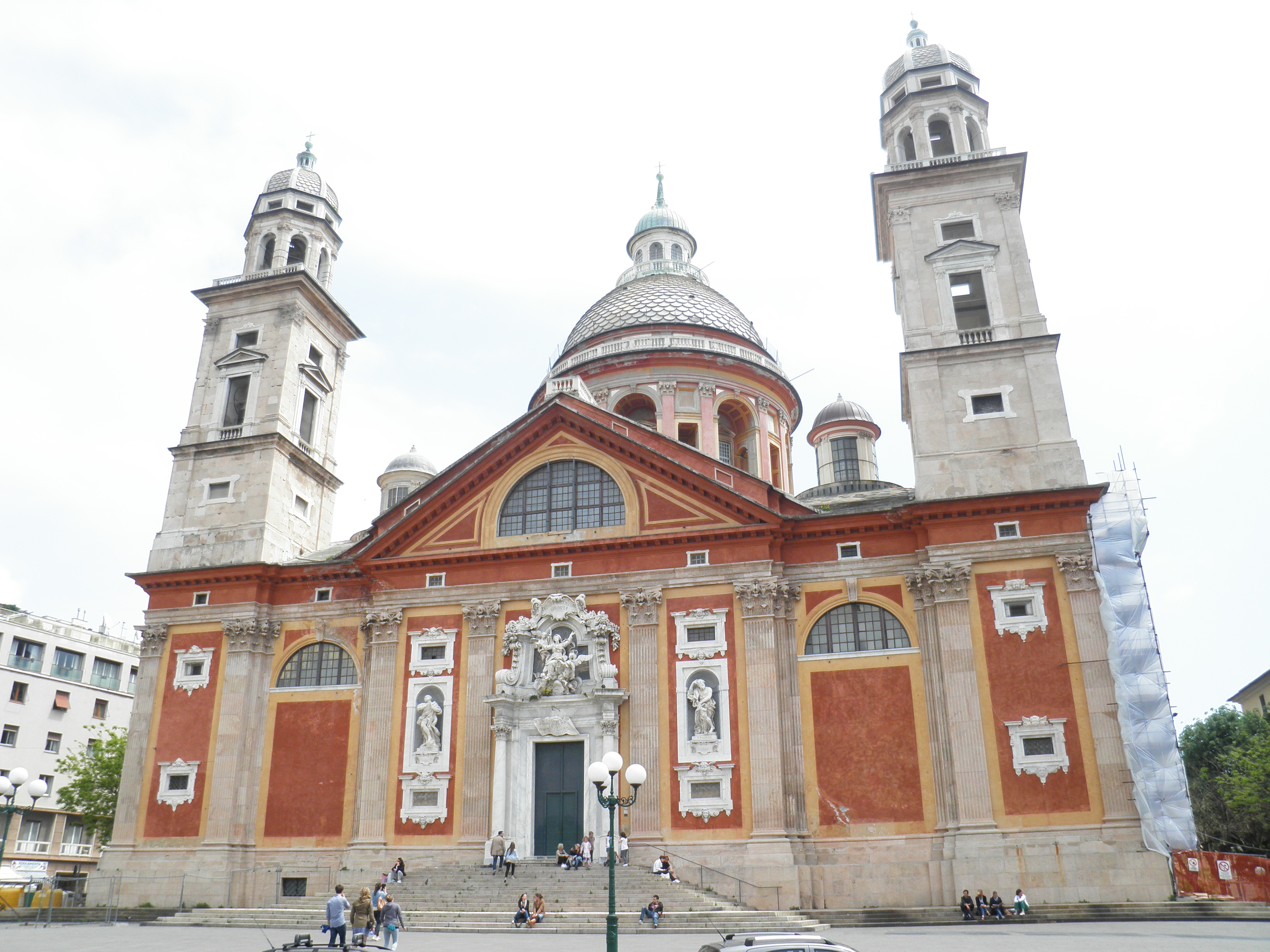
Santa Maria Assunta in Genoa

The dome of the church of Santa Maria Assunta in Genoa was built by Alessi in the middle of the 1500s, about eight years after the dome of Genoa Cathedral. It has a quincunx plan with five domes, with a central two-shell ogival dome on a drum. The 14-meter-wide central dome uses metal tie-rods, masonry rings at the base and top, and buttresses between the shells, but has extensive cracking in both shells that extend to the drum.

=== Habsburg Netherlands ===
In the fifteenth century, pilgrimages to and flourishing trade relations with the Near East had exposed the Low Countries of northwest Europe to the use of bulbous domes in the architecture of the Orient and they were adopted in the architecture of the Netherlands. In Ghent, an octagonal staircase tower for the Church of St. Martin d'Ackerghem, built in the beginning of the sixteenth century, had a bulbous cupola similar to a Syrian minaret. These cupolas were made of wood covered with copper, as were the examples over turrets and towers in the Netherlands at the end of the fifteenth century, many of which have been lost. The earliest example from the Netherlands that has survived is the bulbous cupola built in 1511 over the town hall of Middelburg. Multi-story spires with truncated bulbous cupolas supporting smaller cupolas or crowns became popular in the following decades. The onion shape was used at the top of important sixteenth-century spires such as the Onze Lieve Vrouw Kerk in Haarlem, the 1566 Oude Kerk in Amsterdam, and the 1599 cheese market of Alkmaar.

=== Lands of the Bohemian Crown ===
Russian architecture strongly influenced the many bulbous domes of the wooden churches of Bohemia and Silesia, such as the 1506 wooden church tower in Pniów and the church of St. Anna in Czarnowancz. In the early sixteenth century, the lantern of the Italian dome had spread north as a wood and copper cupola called in Germany the welsche Haube ("Italian hood") and this structure gradually adopted the bulbous cupola from the Netherlands.

Tower finials were replaced by curvilinear domes with openwork lanterns in Wrocÿaw and other Silesian cities around 1530, which may have been in reference to the crusader-era bell tower of the Church of the Holy Sepulchre, before it was destroyed by an earthquake in 1545. One of the earliest domes in Silesia was the 1531 domed tower-like belvedere on the roof of the house of Heinrich Rybisch in Wrocÿaw. The Gothic finial on the tower of St. Elizabeth's Church in Wrocÿaw was damaged by a storm in 1529 and replaced by a dome on an octagonal drum ringed by semicircular gables in 1534.

The town halls of Jawor (1537), Lubaÿ (1544), and Ÿwidnica may have had domed finials. A parish church in Jelenia Góra from 1552 seems to have had a multi-story tower with domes and openwork. The 1554 tower gate of Brzeg Castle included a superstructure of stacked domes and lanterns. Another example was on the town hall of Brzeg, Silesia (1570–76).

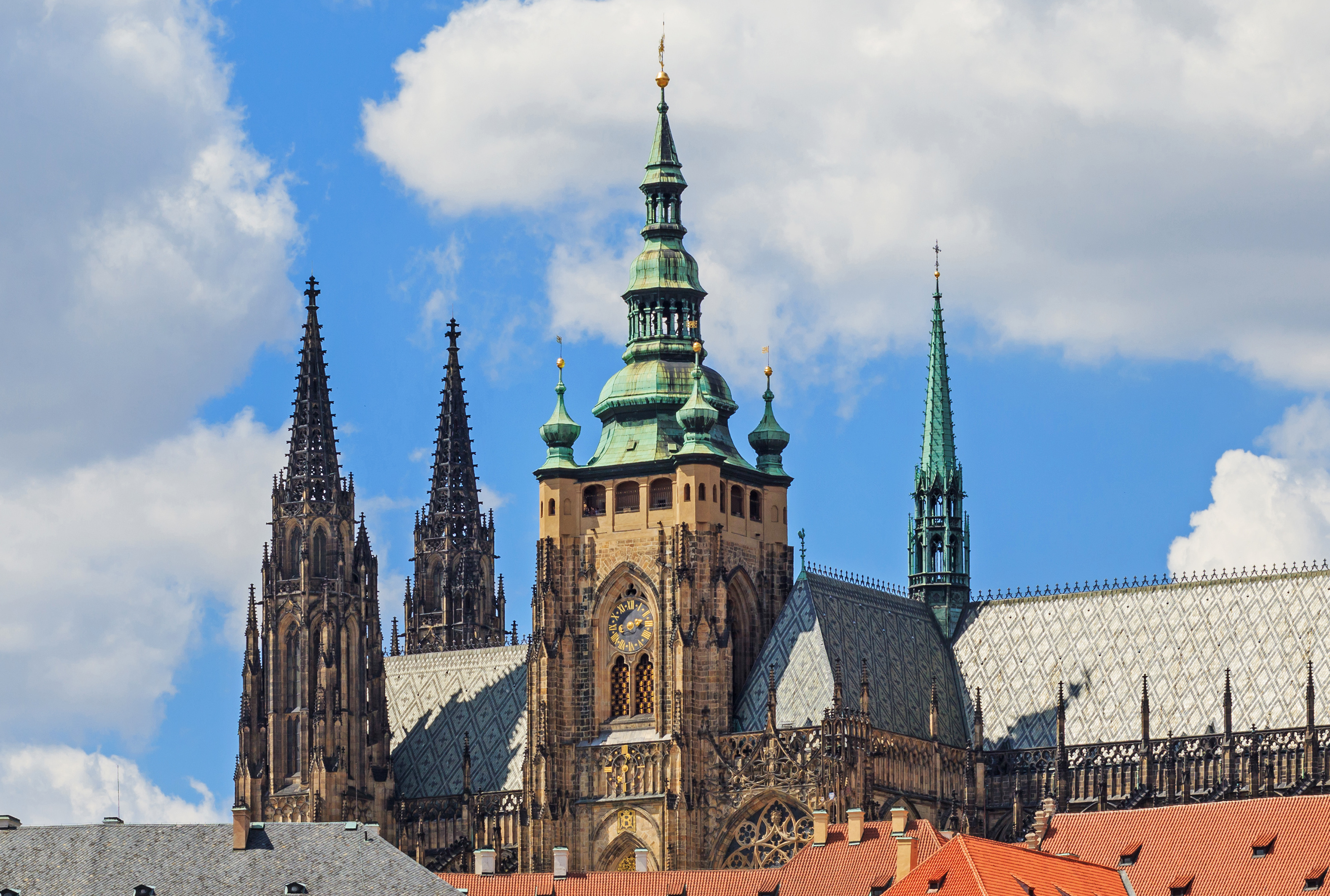
St. Vitus Cathedral in Prague

In Prague, the welsche Haube was apparently little used, but the fully developed onion dome was prominent by the middle of the sixteenth century. The development of the onion shape in Prague architecture may have been an effort to blend Gothic forms with those from Italy, and may also indicate influence from the Netherlands. Drawings published in carpentry manuals and the prestigious association of onion spires with pilgrimage churches encouraged their adoption in the nearby regions of Bavaria, Southern Germany and the Austrian Empire. Drawings of the city of Prague from 1562 and 1606 show towers and spires capped with onion domes. They are seen on the Rosenberg Palace, the old town water tower, and the main spire of St. Vitus Cathedral (1561–1563), the design of which had been approved by Emperor Ferdinand in 1560.

=== Kingdom of the Germans ===
The 1520 church tower in Giessen had a pointed dome surrounded by gables, one of the earliest of the type documented. Domed finials with surrounding gables are documented in Frankfurt Cathedral (1514) and St James' Church in Lübeck. Additional examples are in the tower domes of St. Jacob's Church in Sangerhausen (1514–1542), the Marktkirche Unser Lieben Frauen (1551), and Wetzlar Cathedral (1561).

Bulbous domes in Bavarian rural architecture less resemble Dutch models than Russian ones, due to influence through Bohemia and Silesia. The polygonal domes on the towers of the Frauenkirche in Munich from about 1530 are examples. The dome of Perlachturm (1519) has similar influences.

A château in Dresden with a tower dome from 1535 was remodeled from 1547 to 1557 to have a series of bell-shaped domes, according to a wooden model.

A bulbous dome of Dutch character was on the tower of the town hall of Emden (1574–76) and other examples were on the town halls of Rothenburg ob der Tauber (1572–78) and Lemgo (c. 1589).

=== Duchy of Milan ===
European map of territory under Phillip II in 1580.

The dome of San Sisto in Piacenza (1499–1514) is circular and includes pendentives with circular medallions. Alessio Tramello added the five-domed Chapel of the Virgin Mary to the western transept between 1505 and 1513, possibly inspired by the chapel at Santa Maria presso San Satiro.

Milan, between 1550 and 1650, initiated construction of domes for many important churches. Domes in the Lombard region were traditionally hidden externally by lantern towers called timburios, a technique dating from late Antiquity whose structural behavior was well known, but this began to change starting in the 1560s. Domes exposed externally, or "extradoxed", were proposed by architect Pellegrino Tibaldi for the church of church of San Fedele (1568–69), the church of San Sebastiano (1578–86), and the Sanctuary of Caravaggio (1571). However, the planned extradoxed dome of San Sebastiano had a timburio added and many domes continued to be planned with timburios from the outset. Examples include the Trivulzio chapel in the church of San Nazaro in Brolo (1547), and the churches of Santa Maria delle Grazie, Santa Maria presso San Celso (started in 1497), Santa Maria della Passione (1549–1550), and San Vittore al Corpo (1568–1573). The use of drums beneath domes began in Milan following the trend in Rome and central Italy. They improved lighting for domes but also introduced additional structural problems. The dome of San Vittore al Corpo, like that of Santa Maria Assunta in Genoa, was designed by Galeazzo Alessi as a circular plan dome with double pilasters on the drum but, unlike the Genoa dome, it uses a timburio to cover the outer surface and help restrain thrust.

=== Habsburg Spain and its colonies ===
==== Crown of Aragon ====
===== Kingdom of Aragon =====
The dome of the Cathedral of the Savior of Zaragoza (after 1500) is a late example of the Gothic "double-chevet" style. The cathedral, built from 1316 to 1520, includes two types of crossed-arch dome. Crossed-arch domes were built over the Capilla de la Purificacion in Tarazona Cathedral (16th century) and in the cimborrio of Teruel Cathedral.

===== Kingdom of Naples =====
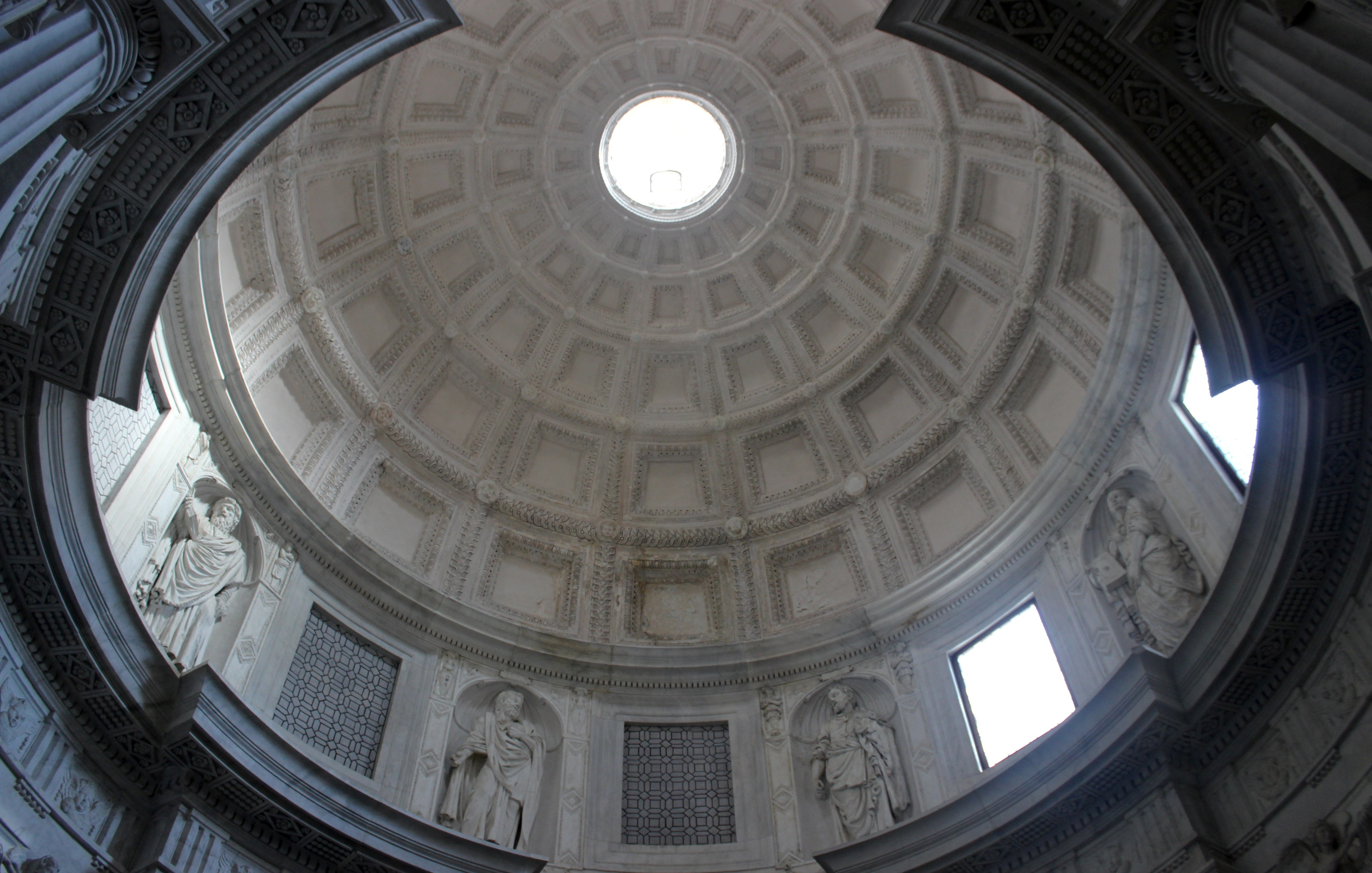
Caracciolo di Vico chapel

In Naples, the domes of the Caracciolo di Vico chapel (c. 1516) and the church of Santa Caterina a Formiello (c. 1519) were built before a more somber style was implemented following the reforms of the Council of Trent. The dome of Santa Caterina a Formiello, considered to be the first to be built in the capital of the Spanish Viceroyalty that used the Tuscan Renaissance style, was finished in 1577. It is about 11 meters in diameter, made of brick and yellow tuff in a single shell, pointed in profile, and has cladding in Piperno stone and grey tuff. The twin pilasters on the drum exterior correspond to ribs in the dome. The heavy original lantern made from Piperno stone was replaced with one made from lighter materials after an earthquake in 1688. Subsequent domes in the 16th century in Naples include those of the monastic complexes of Santa Maria del Popolo, Santi Severino e Sossio, Santa Maria Donnaromita, San Gregorio Armeno, Santa Maria della Mercede a Montecalvario, Santa Maria Regina Coeli, and Santa Maria La Nova. The domes of Santa Maria Donnaromita and San Gregorio Armeno were built about 30 years apart, but are covered with similar colored tiles. Simple domes in Naples without lanterns, or with small lanterns, and with undecorated white surfaces, would later be covered with Baroque painting and sculpture that obscured their original plainness.

In southern Italy, the Church of Santo Stefano in Molfetta was built with a dome and an adjacent 12-sided pavilion vault over its two rooms sometime between 1530 and 1590. The Church of Santa Maria di Porta Santa in Andria, from the middle of the 16th century, similarly has two adjacent bays covered by octagonal cross vaults on pendentives. The dome of the Church of Santa Maria delle Grazie in Campi Salentina was reduced in diameter by a series of lunettes at the base.

===== Kingdom of Valencia =====
The influence of the dome at El Escorial is evident in the dome at the church of Real Colegio Seminario del Corpus Christi in Valencia, which was altered to include a drum between 1595 and 1597.

===== Kingdom of Sicily =====
In Sicily in the second or third decade of the sixteenth century, Giovan Vincenzo Tagliavia commissioned a domed funerary chapel behind the apse of the Church of Santa Maria del Gesù in Castelvetrano, and such domed chapels, although not necessarily funerary, would become a distinctive feature of churches in western Sicily. A large number of domed chapels were built between Palermo and Erice. Domed chapels include the Confrati chapel in Santa Maria de Betlem (1520s) in Modica and the Naselli chapel in the Church of San Francesco all'Immacolata in Comiso (1520s or 1549-1555). The first known hall structure ending in a domed chapel was the Madonna chapel in the church of the Madonna of Trapani, built around 1530, with the domed chapel modeled after the Basilicò chapel in Palermo's church of Santa Maria dello Spasimo.

Domed churches in Sicily include the Church of Sant'Antonio Abate in Palermo (1536) and the Church of San Francesco in Calatafimi, completed in 1556. In Mazara del Vallo after 1550, the Church of Carmine and the former Church of Sant'Egidio were built with sixteen-sided domes next to their apses, above squinches with a shell motif. Between roughly 1540 and 1570 on the southern side of the island, domes were built that rested on shallow arches or lintels instead of corner niches. Examples include the Chapel of the Confrati, integrated into the church of Santa Maria de Betlem in the second half of the 16th century, the church of Sant'Antonio in Scicli, the church of San Francesco in Comiso (1549–1555), and the church of Sant'Antonio in Militello (1560–1574). The church of Santa Maria dei Miracoli included an octagonal vault built by 1580, supported on four slender columns. Other churches with domes include the Church of San Sebastiano in Palermo, Abbey of San Martino delle Scale (1593), San Giorgio dei Genovesi in Palermo, and the Church of the Gesù in Palermo. The dome of the Church of the Gesù was completed in 1567 but has collapsed and been rebuilt several times. The fifth version of the dome followed its destruction in World War II and was made of reinforced concrete with a significantly different appearance than before the war. The brick tambour was covered with stone on the outside and stucco on the inside. The double-shelled dome was covered with stucco on the inside and majolica on the outside.

===== Kingdom of Sardinia =====
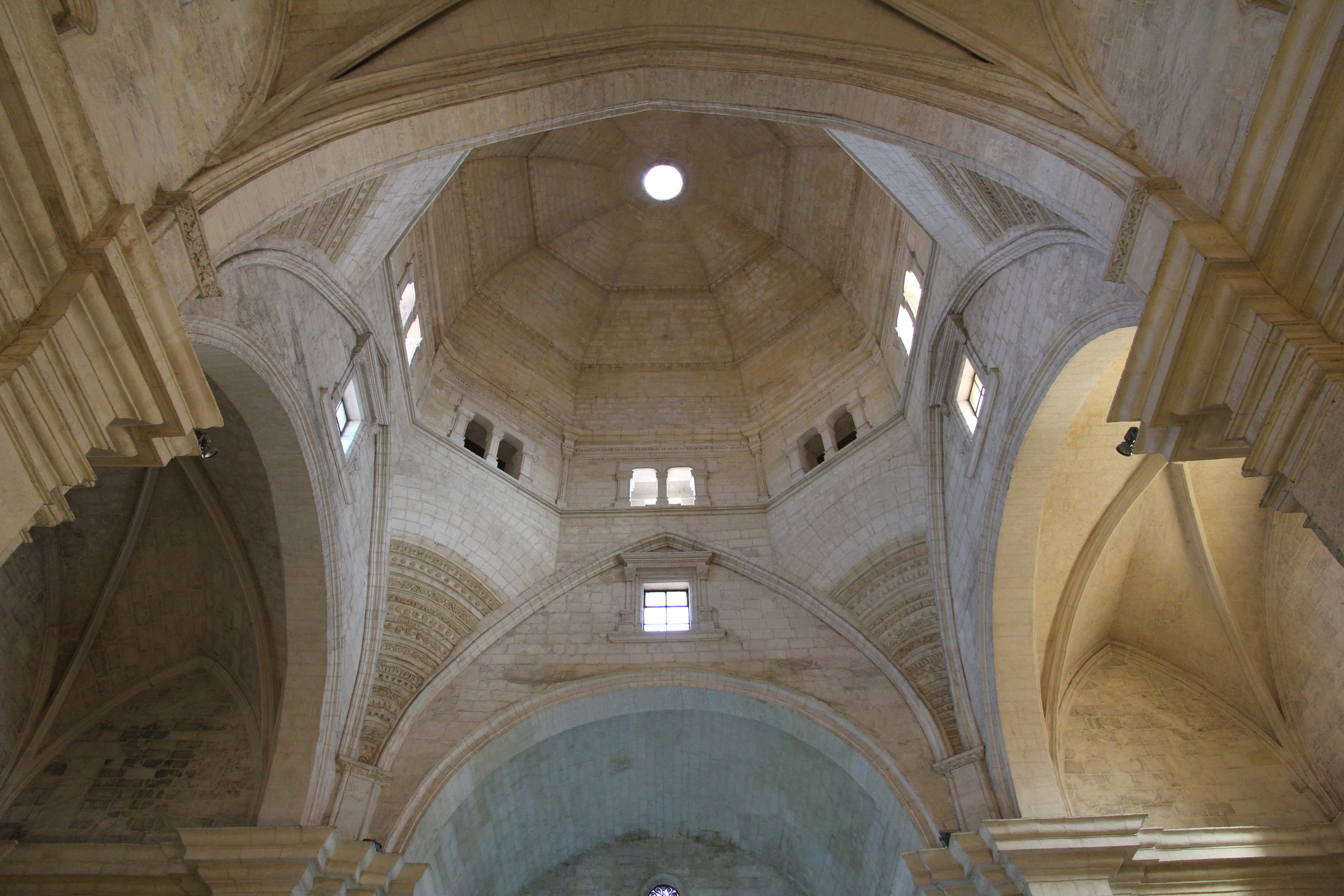
Church of Santa Caterina in Sassari

Barrel vaults and domes were introduced into the gothic church style of the island of Sardinia in the second half of the 16th century by engineers working for the Spanish Crown and the Society of Jesus. Examples include the hemispherical dome on pendentives of the Cathedral of Sassari (1530s), the hemispherical dome on squinches of the Church of Saint Agostino in Cagliari (1577–1580), and the octagonal dome on pendentives of the Church of Santa Caterina in Sassari (1578–1609). A small dome over one of the side chapels in the church of Valverde in Sassari, Sardinia, may date to the 1530s or later.

==== Crown of Castile ====
===== Kingdom of Murcia =====
The "Murcia Dome" over the Chapel of the Junterones in Murcia Cathedral, built in 1540 by Jerónimo Quijano, has a toral geometry achieved by the revolution of a transverse semicircular arch about the oblong plan's short axis.

===== Kingdom of Castile =====
The crossed-arch dome in the Hospital of Santa Cruz de Mendoza in Toledo was built from 1504 to 1514.

In Seville, the dome over the sacristy of Seville Cathedral (c. 1542), the dome over the Royal Chapel at Seville Cathedral (1562–1575), and the dome of the Jesuit Church of the Annunciation (1565–1579) are of a type that partially or entirely emerge from a surrounding parallelepiped, or half-tiburium. The domed trellis vault of Parish of Our Lady of the Consolation in Seville, Spain by Hernán Ruiz is dated to the 1560s.

The domed rotunda chevet chapel of Granada Cathedral was built between 1528 and 1558, initially as an imperial mausoleum for Charles V and his family, and was inspired by the Anastasis of the Holy Sepulchre in Jerusalem. This is reflected in the 22-meter (72 ft) diameter of the dome, which is within a half-meter of the width of the Anastasis dome, the windows immediately under the dome, the approximately two-to-one relationship between the heights of the rotunda and the surrounding ambulatory, and the large triumphal arch between the rotunda and the nave, which was a feature of the Anastasis after the mid-12th century.

The dome of Burgos Cathedral (completed in 1568) is a late example in the Gothic "double-chevet" style. After the 1539 collapse of the original tower it was rebuilt by Juan de Vallejo by 1573, repaired in 1644 following damage from a hurricane and fire, and repaired in the 1980s following damage from a storm. The central vault has eight arms extending from the center to the inner vertices of an eight-sided star polygon, which connects to the inner vertices of another eight-sided star polygon. The gaps between these arms are filled with an openwork grill of various carved shapes, including circles with Greek crosses and trefoils.

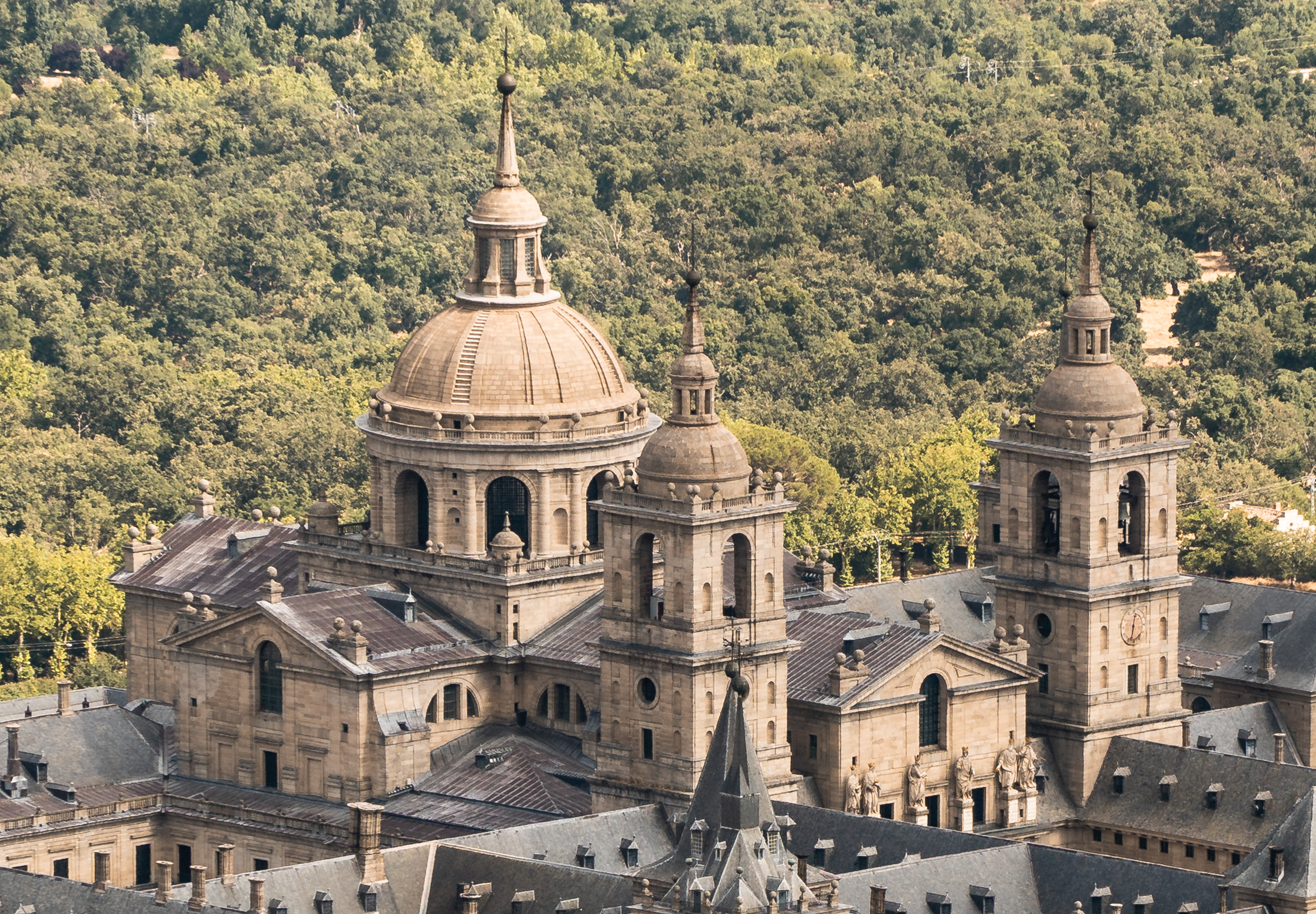
El Escorial

In 1564, a dome on a drum was completed over the vestry of the church of San Miguel in Jerez de la Frontera, a rare Spanish example built before those of El Escorial. The domes over the church and towers of El Escorial, built between 1579 and 1582 as extradosed domes on drums, became a model for subsequent Spanish domes, particularly after Juan de Herrera's publication of the main dome's cross-section in 1589. The main dome over the church is a stone spherical dome and lantern on a cylindrical drum and has an internal diameter of 18.94 meters. Smaller versions with internal diameters of 6.68 meters top the two church towers. It introduced extradosed stone domes on drums to the architecture of Spain, translating the Italian Renaissance style vaults from mainly brick to stone construction. The Courtyard of the Evangelists includes a domed fountain with elliptical lantern pilaster profiles.

The influence of the dome at El Escorial is evident in domes at the church of the College of Nosa Señora da Antiga in Monforte de Lemos (redesigned after 1592 to be extradosed and have a drum), and the church of San Pablo and San Justo in Granada (completed in 1622 with a similar drum). The similarities in the dome over Cerralbo Chapel at Ciudad Rodrigo, which does not have a drum, include the proportions of the dome thickness, the lantern diameter, and the use of horizontal stone courses in the lower portion of the dome up to 32 degrees, rather than radial courses.

Alonso de Vandelvira's Tratado de Arquitectura, from around 1580, is the first Spanish scientific treatise and contains the first recorded definitions of the geometry of meridian and parallel ribs for six kinds of oval domes. It is evidence of the scientific and cultural exchange occurring with Italy in the late sixteenth and early seventeenth centuries. Early oval domes built in Spain in the second half of the sixteenth century include the crossing dome of the cathedral of Cordoba and the chapter house dome of Seville Cathedral. The dome of San Sebastian in Alcaraz, Spain, was completed in 1592 and is said to have been designed by Andrés de Vandelvira before his death. It uses a lattice vault design with a grid of stone structural ribs. The caissons are filled in with lighter or smaller blocks of stone.

===== Kingdom of Navarre =====
The influence of the dome at El Escorial is evident in the domed tower at the Monastery of Irache.

===== Viceroyalty of New Spain =====
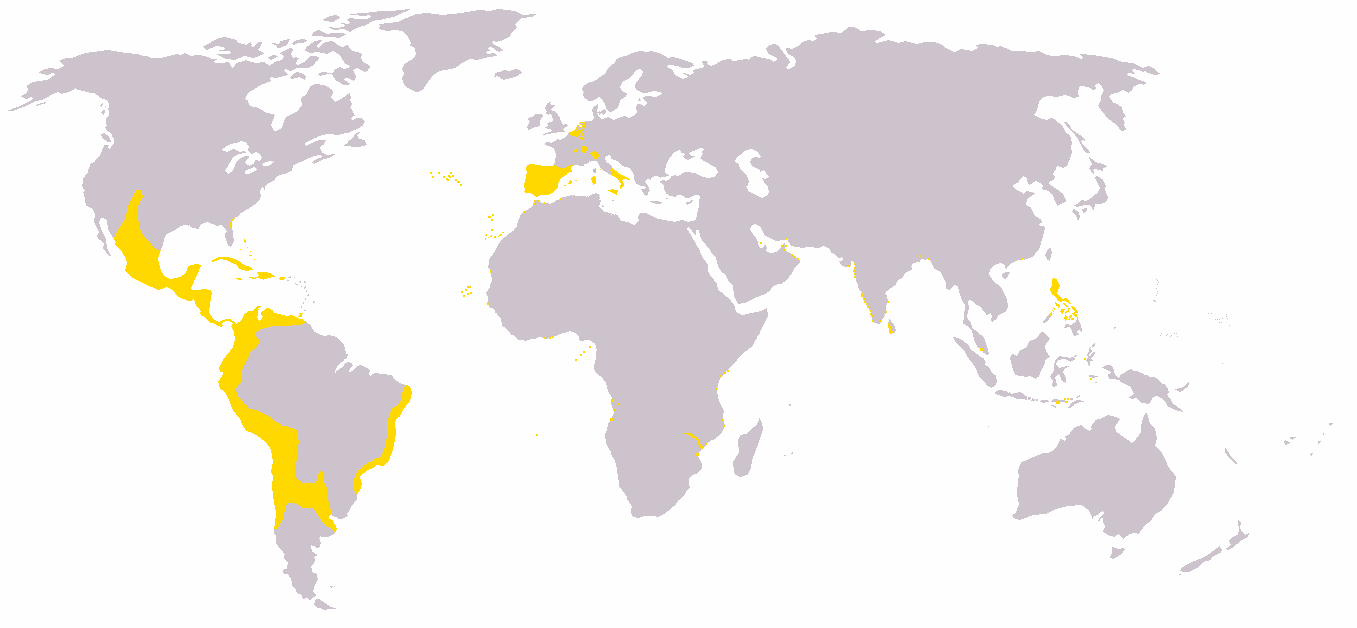
Global map of territory under Phillip II in 1598.

During the Spanish colonization of the Americas, from the 16th to the 18th centuries, thousands of churches were built in Mexico. The churches vary, but surviving examples from central Mexico are typically on a Latin cross plan with a brick dome on a drum at the crossing. Adobe was widely used in early examples but these buildings were often replaced or destroyed by earthquakes. Thick rib cross-vaulting in a dome-like shape was used in the 16th century. Most churches used a bell-gable instead of a bell tower, although stone bell towers were often added in later centuries, typically topped by a small hemispherical dome. Vaults and domes were usually built with brick and, like towers, were particularly vulnerable to earthquakes. Domes developed vertical cracks from the lateral movement and were more vulnerable than vaults because movement in the drums beneath them could increase the damage. A large amount of movement in a single event or the cumulative effect of multiple earthquakes could result in collapse. Only a few examples from the 16th century survive. Domes were sometimes decorated with Azulejo tilework, a style inherited from the Islamic art of Al-Andalus.

Domes were used in some of the earliest churches in Mexico and were also used in secular architecture. Early domes were commonly hemispherical and low, springing from the level of the roofline, rather than using an intervening drum. They almost always have an octagonal base and commonly have windows piercing each segment of the dome near the base, which correspond to dormers on the exterior that are treated as if part of a drum. An examples is the dome of the Church of San Hipólito in Mexico City. The plaza fountain in the Mexican town of Chiapa de Corzo was built in 1586 with a brick octagonal ribbed dome with Mudéjar influences. The Cathedral of Mérida in Yucatán, Mexico, was the first cathedral finished on the American continent and contains a domed trellis vault with a grid of ribs by Juan Miguel de Agüero that is dated to 1598.

===== Viceroyalty of Peru =====
In Lima, churches were built throughout the sixteenth and seventeenth century with stone or brick domes and vaults, even after collapses from seismic activity, due to the concerns of fire and rot in the use of wooden structures.

=== Swiss Confederacy ===
The church of Saint Lucius (begun 1520), now in Moncucco, was a cross-domed church that followed the Venetian model.

== Republic of Venice ==
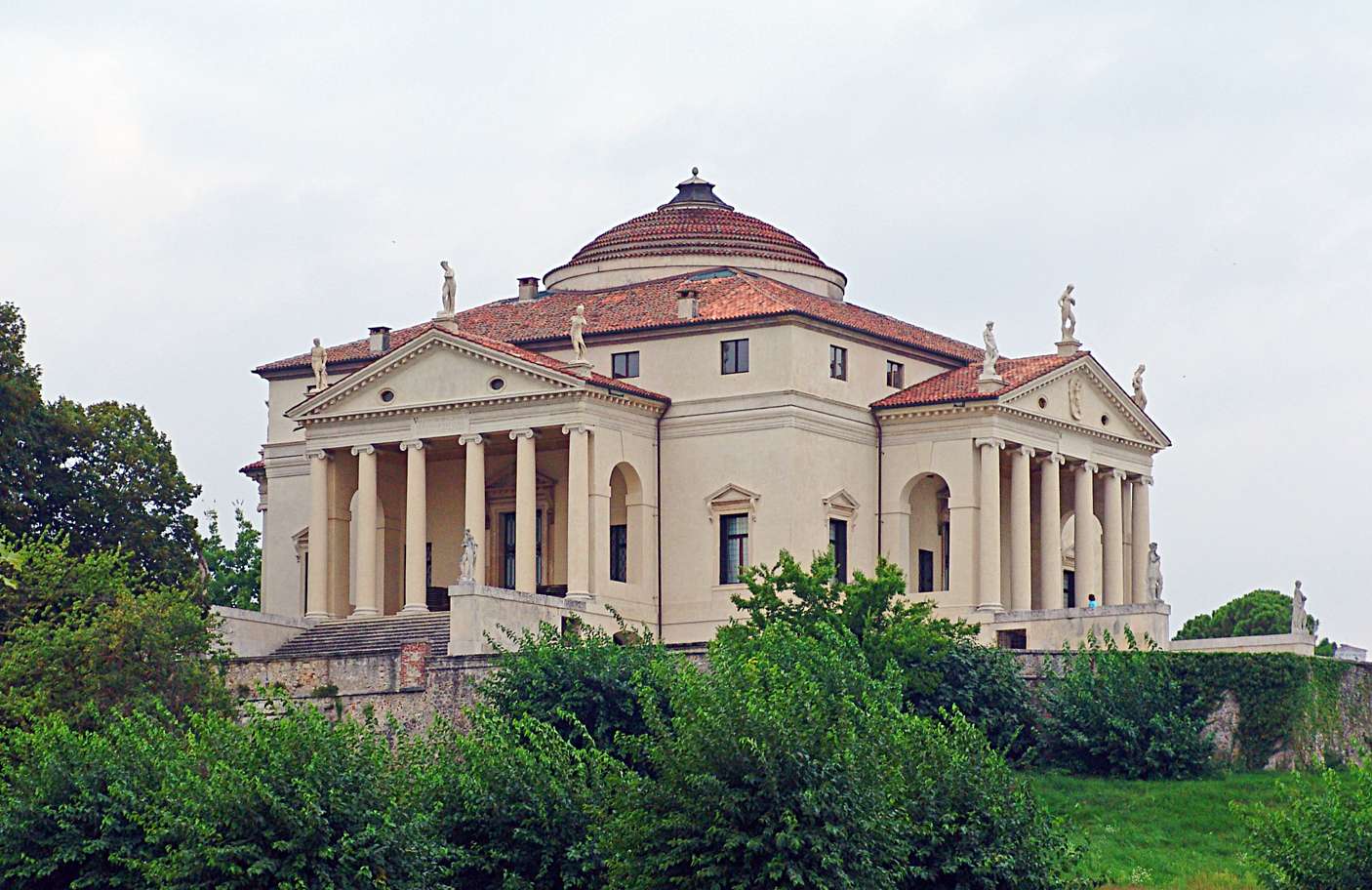
The Villa Capra, or "La Rotonda", near Vicenza.

A large number of cross-domed churches were built in Venice in the Renaissance style between 1490 and 1530 and it became the predominant building type for the period. The Church of San Nicolò di Castello (c. 1476–1503) was subsequently destroyed. The destroyed Church of San Andrea della Certosa (1489–1510) had a cross-domed antechamber. The church of San Giovanni Grisostomo (begun in 1497) was built by Mauro Codussi. The cross-domed church of San Geminiano (begun 1505) at the Piazza San Marco has since been destroyed. The Benedictine convent church of San Benedetto in Bergamo by Pietro Isabello was a cross-domed church built from 1516 to around 1520. The cross-domed church of San Giovanni Elemosinario was begun in 1527. The churches of Santa Maria Mater Domini (c. 1502–1540) and San Felice (early 1530s) have a varied form of cross-dome plan. The church of San Fantin was built beginning in 1507.

The domed bell tower of the church of Madonna dell'Orto was completed in 1503.

In Venice, there is evident Byzantine influence in the line of three domes over the nave and crossing of the church of San Salvador, built between 1506 and 1534 by Giorgio Pietro Spavento and Tullio Lombardo. It repeats the crossed-dome unit three times, similar to the nave of St. Mark's Basilica.

The domed tower of the Palazzo del Capitano in Padua (c. 1532) may have inspired structures in Silesia, similar to the domed bell towers of the Abbey of Santa Giustina (1532) and San Giorgio dei Greci (before 1550). The Abbey of Santa Giustina was begun in 1521 but construction did not accelerate until 1532. Its east end cross-dome system elaborated on versions used in earlier churches.

The Villa Capra, also known as "La Rotunda", was built by Andrea Palladio from 1565 to 1569 near Vicenza. Its highly symmetrical square plan centers on a circular room covered by a dome, and it would prove highly influential on the Georgian architects of 18th century England, architects in Russia, and architects in America, Thomas Jefferson among them. Commissioned by count and churchman Paolo Almerico, Palladio designed a dome for the residence because he believed that the Latin meaning of "domus" being "house" indicated that ancient Roman houses were domed.

Palladio's temple at Villa Barbaro in Maser was built between 1554 and 1580 (often attributed to 1560). It has a hemispherical masonry dome with a large lantern made of timber to reduce its weight. Palladio included an internal circular brickwork beam at the springing of the dome in the drum that resists horizontal movement through friction between bricks and tension within the bricks.

Palladio's two domed churches in Venice are Il Redentore (1577–92) and San Giorgio Maggiore (1565–1610), the former built in thanksgiving for the end of a bad outbreak of plague in the city. Also attributed to Palladio, the church of Le Zitelle (1579–1586) has a timber dome like those of Il Redentore and San Giorgio Maggiore.

== Principality of Moscow and Tsardom of Russia ==
In the 16th century, large five-domed cathedrals were built in Russia in imitation of the Assumption Cathedral in Moscow, such as at Rostov Veliky, Khutyn Monastery, Trinity Makaryev Monastery, Vologda, Danilov Monastery, and Novodevichy Convent.

== Polish–Lithuanian Commonwealth ==
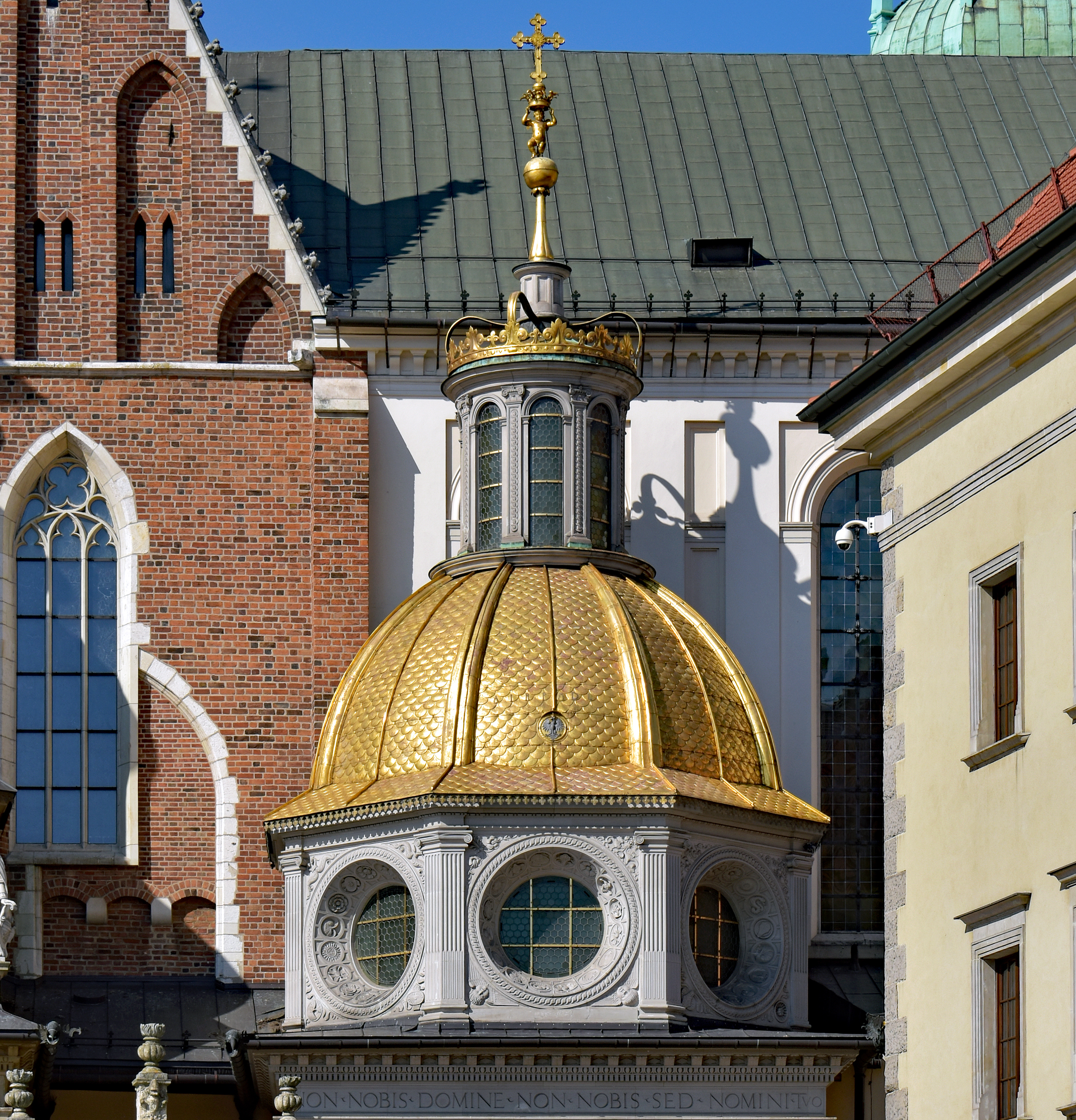
Dome of Sigismund's Chapel in Kraków

The spread of the Renaissance style dome outside of Italy began with central Europe. Although there was often a stylistic delay of a century or two, Poland has a number of important examples, such as the Polish Sigismund's Chapel in Kraków (1517–1533). It was built by Bartolommeo Berrecci and the domed chapel was imitated in the centralized domed chapels of nobles and clergymen for more than a century. An example is the Myszkowski Chapel.

As elements likely associated with Roman Catholic church buildings at this time, the use of domed transepts outside Italy may indicate partiality towards Roman Catholicism over Protestantism. Examples include a church in Dąbrowa Zielona (1554), a Jesuit church in Nieśwież (1586–1599), and a Jesuit church in Kraków. Early examples in Gdańsk, such as the tower of the town hall (1561) and the tower of the church of St. Catherine (1634), show Dutch and possibly Russian influence.

In the eastern parts of the Commonwealth, Orthodox and Greek Catholic churches maintained the forms developed during the Middle Ages, such as Greek cross plans or longitudinal plans in three parts with each part covered by a dome, but with updated styling. Examples include the Walachian church of Paulo Dominici (1591–1629), the Church of St. Onufry in Husiatyn (c. 1600), and the Chapel of the Three Saints (after 1671).

== Kingdom of France ==
Stereotomy, custom cutting of stone voussoirs to form a vault, was first used in French non-ribbed domes at the Château de Bournazel (1545) and the Pendentif de Valence (1548); the technique would be rare in France until the seventeenth century. The dome of a chapel at Château d'Anet by Philibert de l'Orme, built from 1549 to 1552 as part of renovations for King Henry II's mistress, Diane of Poitiers, is regarded as a masterpiece of stereotomy and the architect published a theory of the technique in 1567. The dome consists of thirteen courses of stone voussoirs cut to form seven and a half courses of diamond coffers. The eighteen pairs of ribs between the coffers spiral in opposite directions to a lantern-covered oculus and shrink in size as they ascend, producing an illusion of greater height. The floor beneath the dome was also designed with a pattern corresponding to the coffers of the dome.

== See also ==
- Early and simple domes
- History of modern period domes

== Bibliography ==
- Bagliani, Stefano (May 2009). "The Architecture and Mechanics of Elliptical Domes" (PDF). Proceedings of the Third International Congress on Construction History, Cottbus. Archived from the original (PDF) on 2013-10-16.
- Baxter, Sylvester (1902). Spanish-colonial Architecture in Mexico. Vol. 1 (Gómez de Mora ed.). Boston, MA: J. B. Millet. p. 236.
- Bažant, Jan (2008). The Prague Belvedere (1537 - 1563). Translated by Sherman, Tamah (revised, 2nd ed.). Prague: Festina Lente Press CZ. ISBN 978-80-200-1411-5.
- Bellini, Federico (2017). "8 Vaults and Domes: Statics as an Art". In Mallgrave, Harry Francis; Payne, Alina (eds.). Companion to the History of Architecture, Volume I, Renaissance and Baroque Architecture. John Wiley & Sons, Ltd. pp. 1–33. doi:10.1002/9781118887226.wbcha009. ISBN 978-1-118-88722-6.
- Betts, Richard J. (March 1993). "Structural Innovation and Structural Design in Renaissance Architecture". Journal of the Society of Architectural Historians. 52 (1): 5–25. doi:10.2307/990755. JSTOR 990755.
- Born, Wolfgang (April 1944). "The Introduction of the Bulbous Dome into Gothic Architecture and its Subsequent Development". Speculum. 19 (2): 208–221. doi:10.2307/2849071. JSTOR 2849071. S2CID 162699497.
- Cabezas, Lino (2011). "Ornamentation and Structure in the Representation of Renaissance Architecture in Spain" (PDF). Nexus Network Journal. 13 (2): 257–279. doi:10.1007/s00004-011-0067-3. S2CID 123519607.
- Capone, Mara; Lanzara, Emanuela (2019), "Scan-to-BIM vs 3D ideal model HBIM: Parametric tools to study domes geometry" (PDF), The International Archives of the Photogrammetry, Remote Sensing and Spatial Information Sciences, vol. 42, 2019 8th Intl. Workshop 3D-ARCH “3D Virtual Reconstruction and Visualization of Complex Architectures”, 6–8 February 2019, Bergamo, Italy, pp. 219–226
- Castex, Jean (2008). Architecture of Italy. Reference Guides to National Architecture. Westport, CT: Greenwood Press. ISBN 978-0-313-32086-6.
- Cavalagli, Nicola; Gusella, Vittorio (February 2015). "Dome of the Basilica of Santa Maria Degli Angeli in Assisi: static and dynamic assessment". International Journal of Architectural Heritage. 9 (2): 157–175. doi:10.1080/15583058.2014.951799.
- Choate, Steve B. (1996). "Bramante, Michelangelo and Giacomo Della Porta: The Meaning of the Dome". Athanor. 14. Museum Press of the Florida State University Museum of Fine Arts: 21–29. ISSN 0732-1619.
- Collini, Luca; Fagiani, Ramona; Garziera, Rinaldo; Riabova, Kseniia; Vanali, Marcello (2015). "Load and effectiveness of the tie-rods of an ancient Dome: Technical and historical aspects". Journal of Cultural Heritage. 16 (4): 597–601. doi:10.1016/j.culher.2014.09.008.
- Como, Mario (2013). Statics of Historic Masonry Constructions. Springer. ISBN 978-3-642-30131-5.
- Cottone, Antonio; Bertorotta, Simona (2009), "New Domes for Old Churches (Palermo 1943)" (PDF), Proceedings of the Third International Congress on Construction History, vol. 1, Cottbus, Germany: NEUNPLUS1
- Cowan, Henry J. (1977). "A History of Masonry and Concrete Domes in Building Construction". Building and Environment. 12 (1). Great Britain: Pergamon Press: 1–24. Bibcode:1977BuEnv..12....1C. doi:10.1016/0360-1323(77)90002-6. hdl:2027/mdp.39015041999635.
- Di Liello, Salvatore (2018). "Roman influences in the architecture of domes in Naples at the turn of the XVIth century". Eikonocity. III (2). FeDOA Press - Centro di Ateneo per le Biblioteche dell’Università di Napoli Federico II: 21–34. doi:10.6092/2499-1422/5859.
- Duvernoy, Sylvie (2015), "Baroque Oval Churches: Innovative Geometrical Patterns in Early Modern Sacred Architecture", Nexus Network Journal, 17 (2): 425–456, doi:10.1007/s00004-015-0252-x
- Escrig, F.; Cobreros, A.; Valcarcel, J.P. (1997), "The elliptical dome: a survey of constructive technique to stabilize a sophisticated structure", Structural studies, repairs and maintenance of historical buildings (STREMAH): proceedings of the 5th conference, San Sebastian, Spain, 1997, Advances in architecture series: Vol. 3, Computational Mechanics Publications
- Fernández, Santiago Huerta; Hernández-Ros, Ricardo Aroca (1989). "Masonry Domes: A Study on Proportion and Similarity" (PDF). 10 Years of Progress on Shell and Spatial Structures: 11–15 September 1989. 1. Madrid: Cedex-Laboratorio Central de Estructuras y Materiales.
- Foraboschi, Paolo (2014). "Resisting system and failure modes of masonry domes". Engineering Failure Analysis. 44. Elsevier: 315–337. doi:10.1016/j.engfailanal.2014.05.005. ISSN 1350-6307.
- Francia, Ennio (1982). "New St. Peter's". The Vatican: Spirit and Art of Christian Rome. New York: The Metropolitan Museum of Art: H.N. Abrams. pp. 62–88. ISBN 0-87099-348-8.
- Fusco, Annarosa Cerutti; Villanni, Marcello (2003). "Pietro da Cortona's Domes between New Experimentations and Construction Knowledge". In Huerta, S. (ed.). Proceedings of the First International Congress on Construction History, Madrid, 20th-24th January 2003 (PDF). Madrid: I. Juan de Herrera. pp. 579–591. ISBN 978-84-9728-070-9.
- Galletti, Sara (2021). "Philibert de L'Orme's Dome in the Chapel of the Château d'Anet: The Role of Stereotomy". Architectural History. 64. The Society of Architectural Historians of Great Britain: 253–284. doi:10.1017/arh.2021.11.
- Gallozzi, Arturo (2012), "Construction notes on the lost dome of Montecassino basilica", in Tampone, Gennaro; Corazzi, Roberto; Mandelli, Emma (eds.), Proceedings of the International Congress. DOMES IN THE WORLD. Florence, 19th – 23rd March, 2012, Florence: Nardini Editore, ISBN 978-8-840-44211-2
- Garofalo, Emanuela (2015). "New Architectural Models and Building Tradition: A Dialogue in Early Modern Sardinia – The Jesuit Church in Sassari". International Journal of Architectural Heritage. 9 (2). Taylor & Francis: 143–156. doi:10.1080/15583058.2014.951798.
- Giustina, Irene (2003), "On the art and the culture of domes. Construction in Milan and Lombardy in the late sixteenth and in the first half of the seventeenth century" (PDF), Proceedings of the First International Congress on Construction History, Madrid, Spain: Sociedad Española de Historia de la Construcción, pp. 1033–1042
- Guerrero, Sandra Cynthia Bravo; Gonzalo, José Carlos Palacios (2009), "Crossing Trellis Vaults in Spain and Mexico", Proceedings of the Third International Congress on Construction History, Cottbus, May 2009, Madrid University of Technology
- Günther, Hubertus (1995). "Leitende Bautypen in der Planung der Peterskirche" [Leading Building Types in the Planning of St. Peter's Basilica] (PDF). L'église dans l'architecture de la Renaissance (in German). Picard, Paris (FRA): 41–78.
- Gusella, Vittorio; Belardi, Paolo; Bianconi, Fabio; Armeni, Marco; Cavalagli, Nicola; Martini, Luca (2012). "The domed skyscraper of Galeazzo Alessi. The geometric and structural ambiguities of dome of the Saint Mary of the Angels Basilica". Proceedings of the International Conference Domes in the World. Cultural Identity and Symbolism. Geometric and Formal Genesis. Construction, Identification, Conservation. Florence, Italy: Nardini Editore.
- Hourihane, Colum, ed. (2012). The Grove Encyclopedia of Medieval Art and Architecture. Oxford University Press. ISBN 978-0-19-539536-5.
- Huerta, Santigo (2007). "Oval Domes: History, Geometry and Mechanics". Nexus Network Journal. Vol. 9. SAHGB Publications Limited. pp. 211–248. doi:10.1007/978-3-7643-8699-3_4. ISBN 978-3-7643-8444-9.
- Huylebrouck, Dirk; Buitrago, Antonia Redondo; Iglesias, Encarnación Reyes (2011). "Octagonal Geometry of the Cimborio in Burgos Cathedral". Nexus Network Journal. 13 (1). Turin: Kim Williams Books: 195–203. doi:10.1007/s00004-011-0057-5.
- Jeffery, R. Brooks (2003). "From Azulejos to Zaguanes: The Islamic Legacy in the Built Environment of Hispano-America". Journal of the Southwest. 45 (1). Southwest Center, University of Arizona: 289–327. JSTOR 40170260.
- Krasny, Piotr (1999). "Architecture in Poland 1572-1764". In Ostrowski, Jan K. (ed.). Land of the Winged Horsemen: Art in Poland 1572-1764. New Haven, London: Art Services International. pp. 81–97. doi:10.11588/artdok.00002768.
- Krinsky, Carol Herselle (1971). "Cesariano and the Renaissance without Rome". Arte Lombarda. 16. Vita e Pensiero – Pubblicazioni dell’Università Cattolica del Sacro Cuore: 211–218. JSTOR 43105037.
- Kurzej, Michał (2015). "The Collegiate Church in Zamość in the Context of European Architecture". In Skowrońska, Renata; Flachenecker, Helmut (eds.). Leben zwischen und mit den Kulturen. Studien zu Recht, Bildung und Herrschaft in Mitteleuropa. Vol. 2. Toruń/Würzburg: Polska Misja Historyczna przy Uniwersytecie Juliusza Maksymiliana. pp. 169–186. ISBN 978-8-323-13491-6.
- López-Mozo, Ana (January 2003), "Extradosed vaults in the Monastery of El Escorial: The domes at the church towers" (PDF), Proceedings of the First International Congress on Construction History, Madrid, 20th-24th January 2003, Madrid, Spain: Sociedad Española de Historia de la Construcción, pp. 1321–1326
- López Mozo, Ana (2011). "Ovals for any given proportion in architecture: a layout possibly known in the sixteenth century" (PDF). Nexus Network Journal. 13 (3). Kim Williams Books, Turin: 569–597. doi:10.1007/s00004-011-0083-3.
- López-Mozo, Ana (October 2013), "La huella de El Escorial en las cúpulas españolas de finales del siglo XVI. El caso de la Capilla Cerralbo de Ciudad Rodrigo" [The influence of the Escorial on Spanish domes at the end of the 16th century. The case of Cerralbo Chapel in Ciudad Rodrigo], Informes de la Construcción, 65 (EXTRA-2): 95–109, doi:10.3989/ic.13.015
- Łuniewicz, Zygmunt (2016). "Nowożytne hełmy wieżowe na Śląsku – próba reinterpretacji pochodzenia" [Modern Tower Helmets in Silesia – An Attempt to Reinterpret Their Origins]. Quart. The Quarterly of the Institute of Art History at the University of Wrocław (in Polish). 41 (3). Institute of Art History at the University of Wrocław: 3–25.
- Mainstone, Rowland (2003). "Saving the dome of St Peter's". Construction History. 19. The Construction History Society: 3–18. JSTOR 41613860.
- McNeil, Ian, ed. (2002). An Encyclopaedia of the History of Technology. Routledge. ISBN 978-1-134-98165-6.
- Melaragno, Michele G. (1991). An Introduction to Shell Structures: the Art and Science of Vaulting (softcover ed.). New York, New York: Van Nostrand Reinhold. ISBN 978-1-4757-0225-5.
- Millon, Henry A. (2005). "Michelangelo to Marchionni, 1546–1784". In Tronzo, William (ed.). St. Peter's in the Vatican. Cambridge University Press. pp. 93–110. ISBN 978-0-521-64096-1.
- Niglio, Olimpia (2012), "A scientific approach to the Dome of St. Peter in Rome. The expertise of three mathematicians of the Dotti's Roman Republic (1742)", in Tampone, Gennaro; Corazzi, Roberto; Mandelli, Emma (eds.), Proceedings of the International Congress. DOMES IN THE WORLD. Florence, 19th – 23rd March, 2012 (PDF), Florence: Nardini Editore, ISBN 978-8-840-44211-2
- Nobile, Marco Rosario (2016). Architettura e costruzione in Italia Meridionale (XVI-XVII sec.) [Architecture and Construction in Southern Italy (16th-17th Century)] (PDF). Tracciati. Storia e costruzione nel Mediterraneo (in Italian). Palermo: Edizioni Caracol s.n.c. ISBN 978-88-98546-64-0.
- Nuttgens, Patrick (1997). The Story of Architecture. Hong Kong: Phaidon Press Limited. ISBN 978-0-7148-3616-4.
- Ostrowski, Jan K. (1999). "Polish Baroque Art in Its Social and Religious Context". In Ostrowski, Jan K. (ed.). Land of the Winged Horsemen: Art in Poland 1572-1764 (PDF). New Haven, London: Art Services International. pp. 39–53.
- Ottoni, Federica; Blasi, Carlo (2016). "Hooping as an ancient remedy for conservation of large masonry domes". International Journal of Architectural Heritage. 10 (2–3). Taylor & Francis Group: 164–181. doi:10.1080/15583058.2015.1113335.
- Pajovic, Luka (2024). Holzer, Stefan; Langenberg, Silke; Knobling, Clemens; Kasap, Orkun (eds.). "Thin Timber Domes in Restoration England (c. 1670–1680)". Construction Matters: Proceedings of the 8th international congress on construction history - Zürich. vdf Hochschulverlag AG: 730–737. doi:10.3218/4166-8. ISBN 978-3-7281-4166-8.
- Peña, Fernando; Manzano, Julio (2015), "Dynamical Characterization of Typical Mexican Colonial Churches", in Psycharis, I.; Pantazopoulou, S.; Papadrakakis, M. (eds.), Seismic Assessment, Behavior and Retrofit of Heritage Buildings and Monuments, Computational Methods in Applied Sciences, vol. 37, Springer, Cham, pp. 297–319, doi:10.1007/978-3-319-16130-3_12, ISBN 978-3-319-16130-3
- Peña, Fernando; Chávez, Marcos M. (2016). "Seismic Behavior of Mexican Colonial Churches". International Journal of Architectural Heritage. 10 (2–3): 332–345. doi:10.1080/15583058.2015.1113341. S2CID 112134136.
- Randl, Chad (2008). Revolving Architecture: A History of Buildings That Rotate, Swivel, and Pivot. Princeton Architectural Press. p. 208. ISBN 978-1-568-98681-4.
- Rivoira, Giovanni Teresio (1925). Roman Architecture and Its Principles of Construction Under the Empire: With an Appendix on the Evolution of the Dome Up to the XVIIth Century. Translated by Rushforth, Gordon McNeil (illustrated, reprint ed.). Clarendon Press.
- Rosenthal, Earl (March 1958). "A Renaissance "Copy" of the Holy Sepulchre". Journal of the Society of Architectural Historians. 17 (1). University of California Press: 2–11. doi:10.2307/987831. JSTOR 987831.
- Russo, Valentina (2020). "Construction history and digital heritage. Experimentations on renaissance domes in Campania (Italy)" (PDF). The International Archives of the Photogrammetry, Remote Sensing and Spatial Information Sciences. XLIV-M-1-2020. HERITAGE2020 (3DPast ǀ RISK-Terra) International Conference, 9–12 September 2020, Valencia, Spain: 295–302. Archived from the original on 2020-07-25.
- Sakkal, Mamoun (1995). "Geometry of ribbed domes in Spain and North Africa". Journal for the History of Arabic Science. 11 (1&2). Institute for the History of Arabic Science, University of Aleppo: 53–73.
- Schindler, Hans (May 1981). "Concerning the Origin of the Onion Dome and Onion Spires in Central European Architecture". Journal of the Society of Architectural Historians. 40 (2): 138–142. doi:10.2307/989727. JSTOR 989727.
- Schlimme, Hermann (2006). "Construction Knowledge in Comparison: Architects, Mathematicians and Natural Philosophers Discuss the Damage to St. Peters Dome in 1743" (PDF). International Congress on Construction History. 2: 2853–2867.
- Shearman, John (1992), "IV Domes", Only Connect: Art and the Spectator in the Italian Renaissance, vol. 5579, Princeton University Press, pp. 149–191
- Solovyev, Nikolay K. (2014). "Religious Interiors of Moscow State Period (late 14th – 17th centuries)". Texts. 1. Foundation privee Maison Burganov: 32–54. ISSN 2294-8902.
- Stephenson, Davis; Hammond, Victoria; Davi, Keith F. (2005). Visions of Heaven: the Dome in European Architecture. Princeton Architectural Press. ISBN 978-1-56898-549-7.
- Tucci, G.; Nobile, A.; Riemma, M. (2012), "Laser scanner surveys and the study of the geometry and structure of the dome in the Basilica della Madonna dell'Umiltà in Pistoia", in Tampone, Gennaro; Corazzi, Roberto; Mandelli, Emma (eds.), Proceedings of the International Congress. DOMES IN THE WORLD. Florence, 19th – 23rd March, 2012, Florence: Nardini Editore, ISBN 978-8-840-44211-2
- Valdez, Pedro Hurtado (May 2009). "Masonry or Wooden Vaults?: The Technical Discussion to Rebuilt the Vaults of the Cathedral of Lima in the Seventeenth Century" (PDF). Proceedings of the Third International Congress on Construction History, Cottbus: 845–852.
- Ward, Clarence (1915). Mediaeval Church Vaulting (illustrated ed.). Princeton: Princeton University Press.
- Weber, Ingrid S. (1987). "The Significance of Papal Medals for the Architectural History of Rome". Studies in the History of Art. Vol. 21, Symposium Papers VIII: Italian Medals. 21. National Gallery of Art: 283–297. JSTOR 42620187.
- Wouters, Ine; van de Voorde, Stephanie; Bertels, Inge; Espion, Bernard; de Jonge, Krista; Zastavni, Denis (2018). Building Knowledge, Constructing Histories. Vol. 1. CRC Press. ISBN 978-0-429-82264-3. Proceedings of the 6th International Congress on Construction History (6ICCH 2018), July 9–13, 2018, Brussels, Belgium.
- The Dome, Uffici di Presidenza S.C.V.
