= Santa Maria dei Miracoli, Palermo =

Church building in Palermo, Italy

Santa Maria dei Miracoli
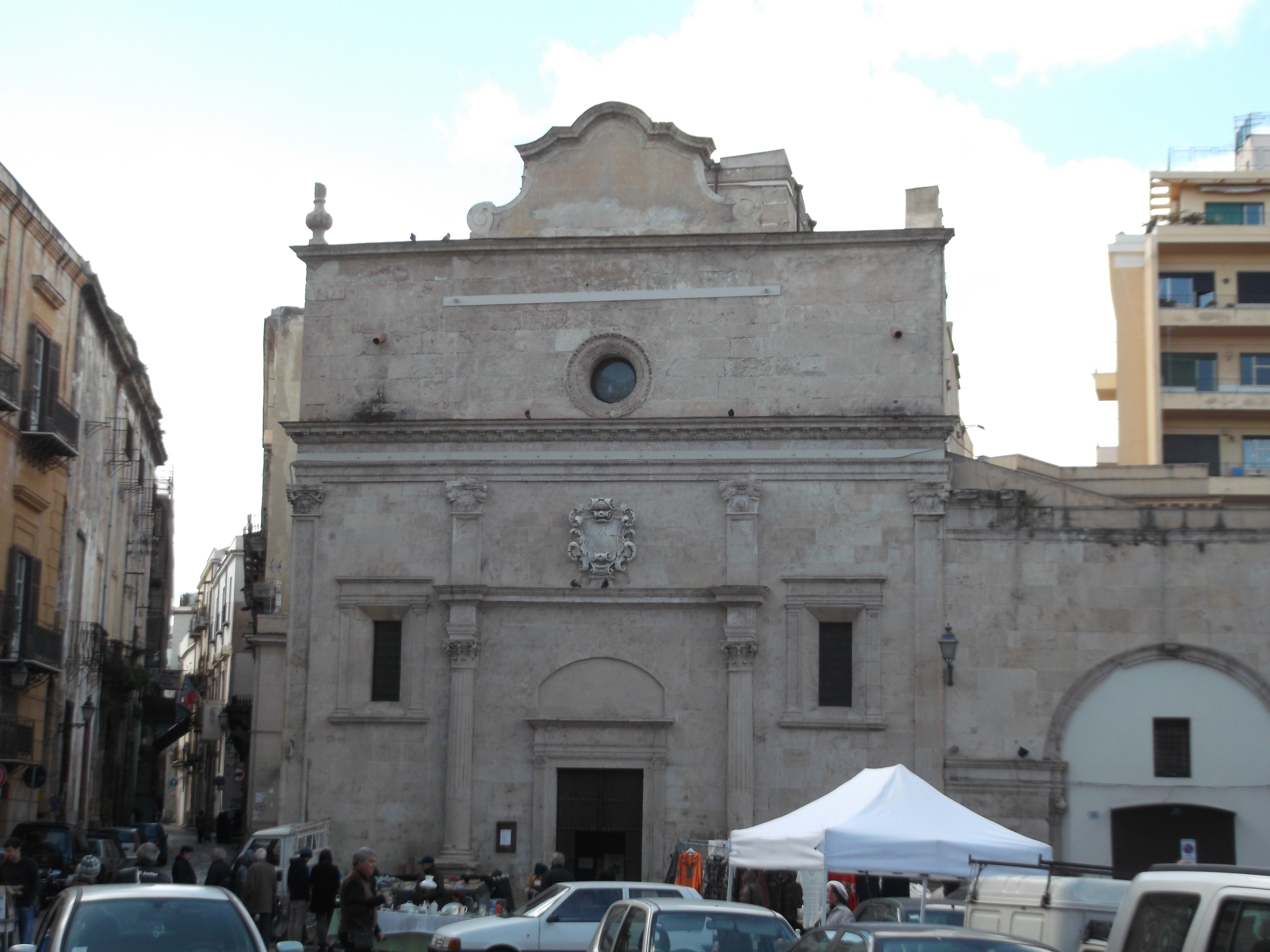
- Facade of the church

- Location in Sicily Location in Italy

Religion
- Affiliation: Roman Catholic
- Province: Archdiocese of Palermo
- Rite: Roman Rite

Location
- Location: Piazza Marina, Palermo, Italy
- Interactive map of Santa Maria dei Miracoli
- Coordinates: 38.1168°N 13.3687°E

Santa Maria dei Miracoli (English: Holy Mary of the Miracles is a Renaissance-style, Roman Catholic church located in the quarter of Kalsa (Tribunali) of the historic centre of Palermo, region of Sicily, Italy. It is located in front of the Giardini Garibaldini and Piazza Marina.

== History and decoration ==
The church was founded in 1543 after a miraculous event linked to a Marian icon. Putatively during the festival of Santa Cristina in May, a Marian icon, painted on a wall near this site, was linked to a number of miracles. The Senate of Palermo granted the land, and a confraternity was established to gather donations for construction of a church. In 1547, under the government of the Spanish viceroy of Sicily, Giovanni della Vega, and the archbishop Pietro Tagliavia d'Aragona, and with added patronage of the Florentine community, the church was completed. In 1629, when the Florentines were expelled from Palermo, the church was granted to the Frati Conventuali of the Franciscan order, who established adjacent a seminary (novitiate) called il Conventino. On the right of the facade, the arch represents the remains a small chapel dedicated to Santa Apollonia.

The Franciscan convent flagged in population, and was suppressed in 1775, and razed after severe damage during World War II. The church was only reconsecrated in 1970. In 2008, the archbishop of Palermo, cardinal Paolo Romeo, assigned the church pastoral duties for the immigrants in Palermo, assigning a cleric from the order of the Missionary Oblates of Mary Immaculate. Due to damage from the 2002 earthquake, the church underwent restoration completed in 2011.

The architect is unknown, although the work has been attributed to either Fazio Gagini or Pasqualino Scaglione. The facade is flat and generally plain with exception of a coat of arms and a small oculus above the portal. The facade has awkwardly sized central columns. The ground floor flanking the portal has two Corinthian columns atop a tall pedestal, surmounted by a small composite pilaster. On the facade, a plaque has the date 1581. The church has a Greek cross layout and leads to a somewhat archaic semi-circular apse with some gothic tracery.

The interior houses a canvas copy of the original Marian icon, a veneration known as the "Madonna delle Grazie of Constantinople", which originally was a fresco painted on a wall. The former marble main altar was completed in the late 19th-century. New decoration has been added in the 21st century, including a new altar in the shape of a boat. The crucifix above the altar was carved in the Congo. The tabernacle by Giuseppe Vitrano, is shaped like a globe.

== See also ==
- 16th-century Western domes
