= Santa Maria de Betlem, Modica =

Church building in Modica, Italy

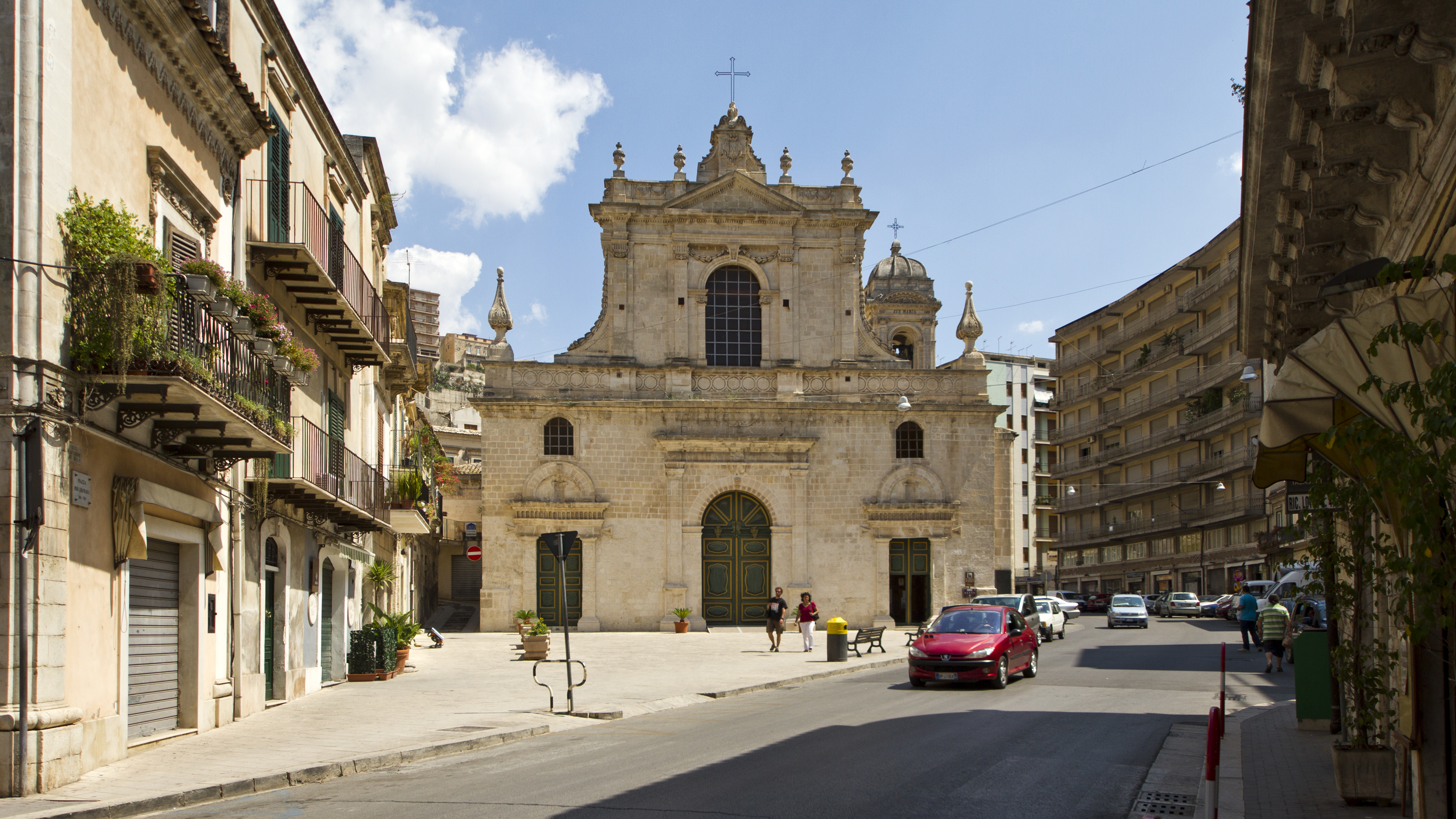

Santa Maria de Betlem is a Roman Catholic church located on Via Marchesa Tedeschi in the town of Modica, province of Ragusa, Sicily, Italy.

== History ==
A church at the site was present by the 16th century; the present church has elements of construction from its origins until the 19th century. On the left flank of the church is a bas-relief sculpted lunette (15th-16th century) depicting an Adoration of the Shepherds, perhaps derived from a no longer extant church named Santa Maria di Berlon.

The interior houses the early 16th-century Cappella Cabrera whose peak arches show a persistent attachment to gothic style. The portal has a rich sculptural decoration in the pilasters and capitals. Some of the exuberant decoration is carried on inside the church. The church houses a monumental presepe or nativity scene completed in 1882 by Bongiovanni Vaccaro from Caltagirone.

== See also ==
- 16th-century Western domes
