= Wetzlar Cathedral =

Church in Wetzlar, Hesse, Germany

Coordinates: 50°33′21″N 8°30′07″E

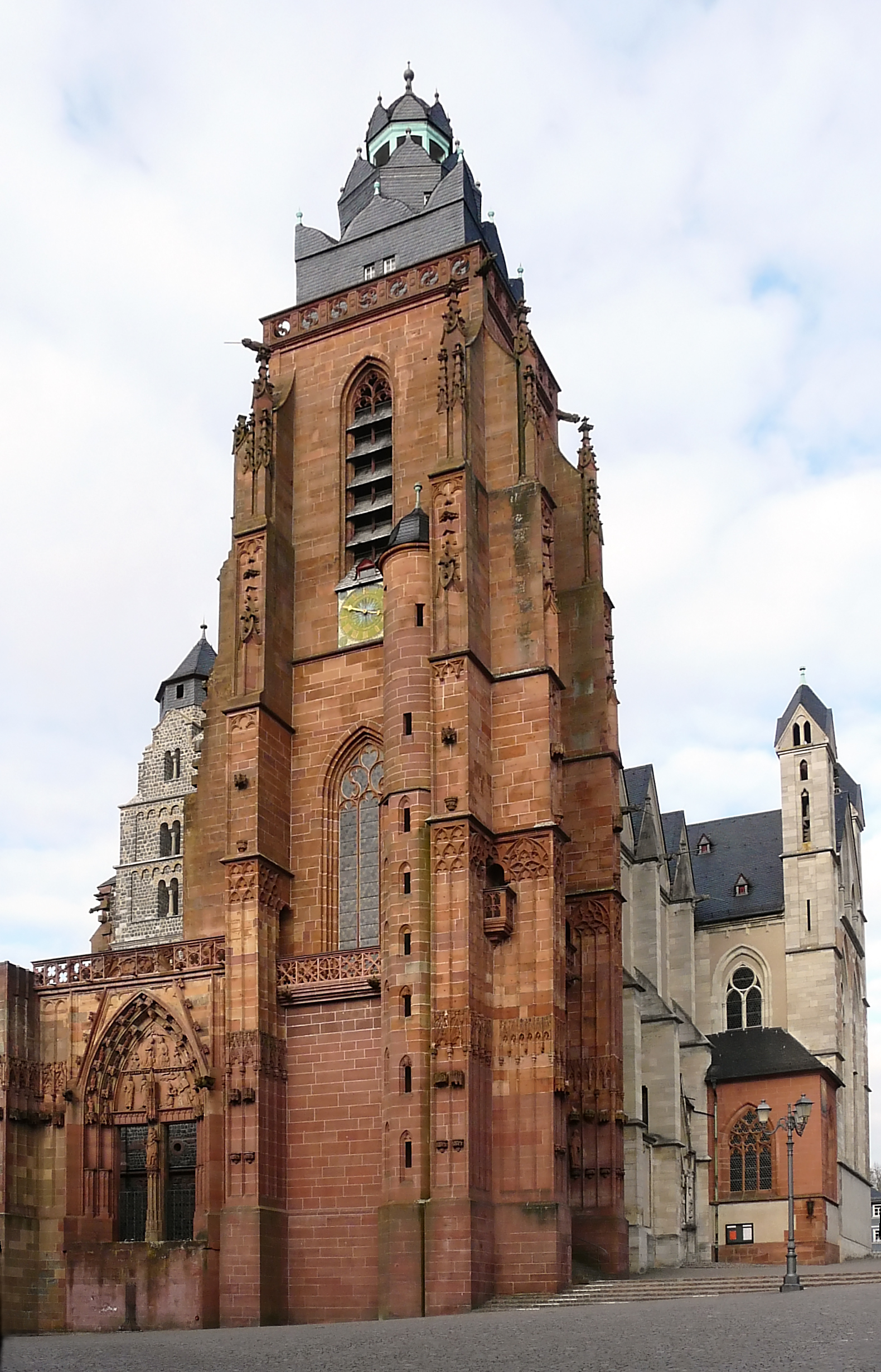
Wetzlar Cathedral

Wetzlar Cathedral is a large church in the town of Wetzlar, located on the Lahn river some 50 km north of Frankfurt (Hesse, Germany). Construction began in 1230 and is still unfinished, since the western front is still missing its northern belfry. Because of its long period of construction, the church combines romanesque, gothic and baroque architecture.

The church has never been a bishop's seat, and therefore is not a cathedral in the English sense. The German term for "cathedral", Dom, often includes churches that lack a cathedra (a bishop's throne) and instead refers to any large medieval church. In Wetzlar, the main church has been called a Dom since the 17th century.

== History ==
In 897, Rudolf I, Bishop of Würzburg, consecrated a Salvator Church replacing an older church on the same location. In the early 10th century it became a Collegiate church devoted to St. Mary. Around 1170 the church was rebuilt into a romanesque basilica with two western spires. Parts of the western portal are still visible in the contemporary building.

After 1230, the cathedral was rebuilt and extended again. Construction lasted until 1490 and remained unfinished. The church became a Hall church with two towers. Construction of the northern spire was started but abandoned long before completion (see image). The southern tower's steep pinnacle was made of wood and was destroyed by a fire in 1561. It was replaced by the baroque tower roof still extant today.

In World War II the cathedral was damaged by bombs. Most of the damage was repairable, but the precious stained glass windows and the organ were lost and had to be replaced by modern equipment.

Since the 16th century, Wetzlar Cathedral has been used as a simultaneum by both Roman Catholics (whose congregations form part of today's Roman Catholic Diocese of Limburg) and Protestants. Today, the church is the main tourist attraction inside the historical city center of Wetzlar.

== See also ==
- 16th-century Western domes
