= Santa Maria della Mercede a Montecalvario =

Church building in Naples, Italy

Church of Santa Maria della Mercede a Montecalvario
- Chiesa di Santa Maria della Mercede a Montecalvario
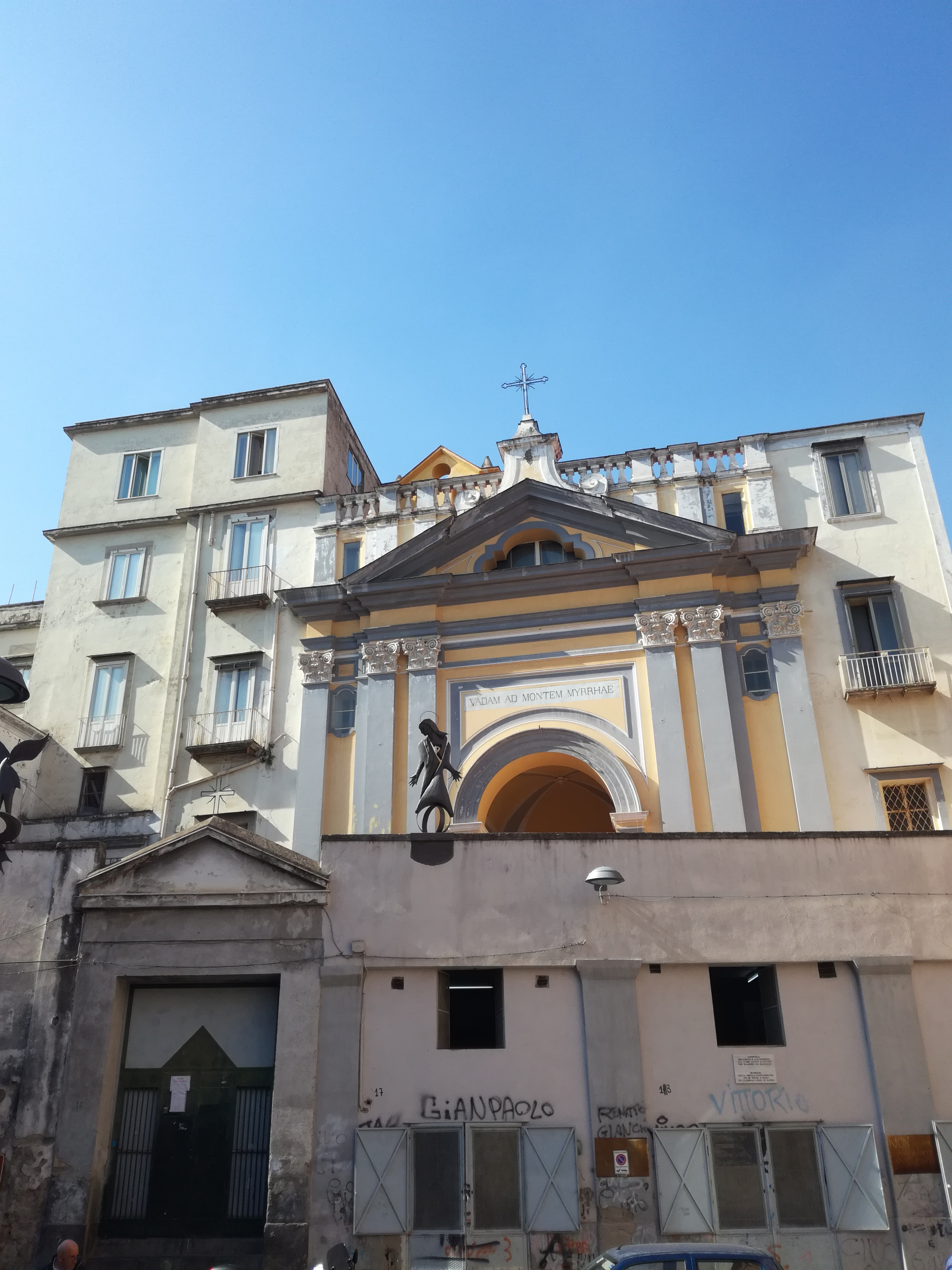
- Façade
- Church of Santa Maria della Mercede a Montecalvario
- 40.589842°N 14.245781°E
- Location: Naples; Province of Naples, Campania
- Country: Italy
- Denomination: Roman Catholic

History
- Status: Active

Architecture
- Architectural type: Church
- Style: Baroque architecture
- Groundbreaking: 1560

Administration
- Diocese: Roman Catholic Archdiocese of Naples

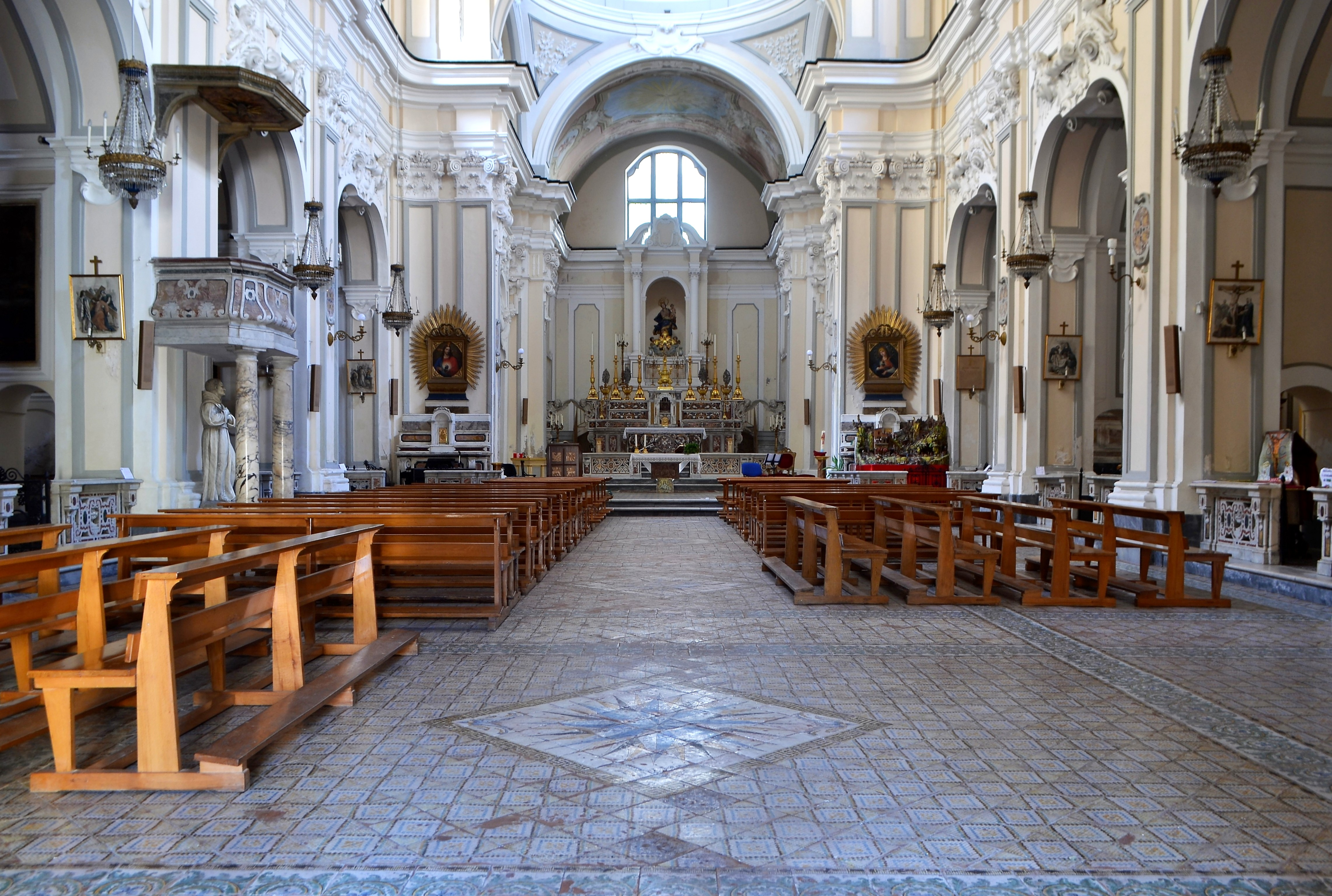
Interior

Santa Maria della Mercede a Montecalvario (known also as the church of Montecalvario) is a church located on largo Montecalvario in Naples, Italy.

The church was founded in 1560, endowed by the Neapolitan aristocrat Ilaria D'Apuzzo, who donated the church to the Franciscan order. By the 1580s, the church is attached to the Congregation of the Immaculate Conception. In the 17th century, the church was enlarged and provided with a monumental entrance stairwell and portico with five arches. In 1677, the church underwent Baroque interior decoration by Gennaro Schiavo. In 1808, the church was closed, and turned into barracks. The portico became a marketplace designed by Stefano Gasse. The original baroque staircase was replaced by a nondescript stairway. A decade later, the Franciscans returned to the convent and restored the church. A school has been built at the site of the former college. In 1980, a predella with a procession of the blood of San Gennaro was restored and is now kept beneath the marble main altar.

== The interior ==
The main altar and holy water fonts are from the studio of Fanzago. In the first chapel on the left is a 16th-century canvas depicting the Madonna of the Rosary with the Universal Judgement by Michele Cuira. The other chapels include paintings such as a Deposition by the school of Giovanni Bernardo Lama; a triptych with the Annunciation and Saint Andrew and Veronica by the school of Andrea Sabbatini. A depiction of the Virgin Mary with Pius V and Philip II can be seen at Santa Maria della Mercede a Montecalvario. Other works in the church are by Leonardo Castellani, by Giacomo da Cosenza, and followers of Beinaschi.

== See also ==
- 16th-century Western domes

== Bibliography ==
- Antonio Terraciano, Andrea Russo, Le chiese di Napoli. Censimento e brevi recensioni delle 448 chiese storiche della città di Napoli, Lorenzo Giunta, Editor, 1999.
- AA.VV. Napoli: Montecalvario questione aperta, Clean edition, Naples, Italy.
