= Bongiovanni Vaccaro =

Italian sculptor

Bongiovanni Vaccaro (19th century) was an Italian sculptor and ceramist.

He was born and resident in Caltagirone, Sicily. he was known for his ornamental bas-reliefs, specially on urns and for his allegorical busts. He also made five busts in terra cotta depicting: Europe; Asia; Africa; America, and Oceania. His terracotta nativity scene (presepe) composed of a few dozen figures, often painted, was displayed in 2012 at the Museo Regionale di Ceramica at Caltagirone. Another presepe is on display in Santa Maria de Betlem, Modica.
