= San Benedetto, Bergamo =

Building in Bergamo, Italy

Coordinates: 45.6969°N 9.6640°E

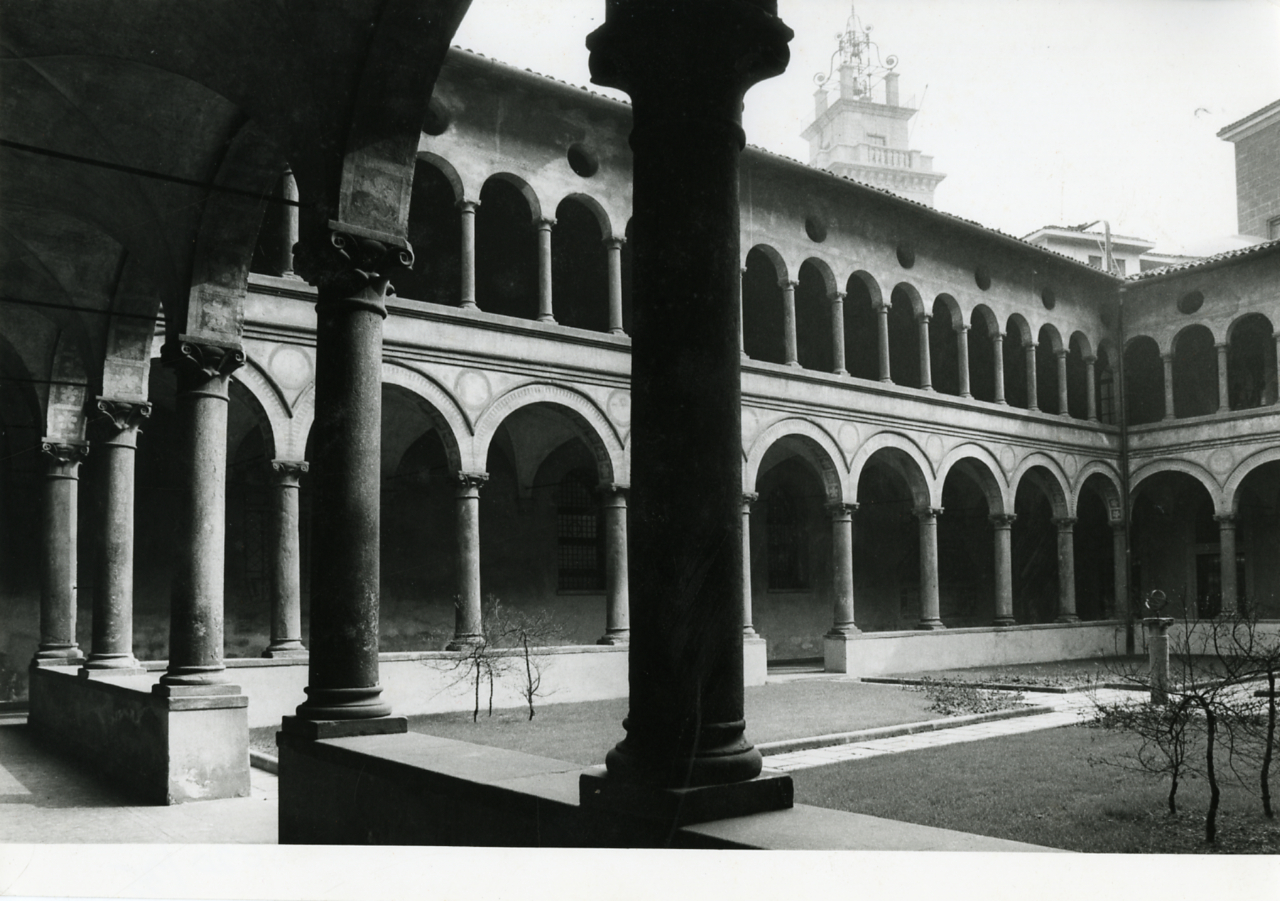
The cloister of the Benedictine monastery in Bergamo, as photographed in 1981 by Paolo Monti.

San Benedetto is a Renaissance-style, Roman Catholic church in Bergamo, Italy.

The church was designed in 1500s by Pietro Isabello. The church was refurbished in 1756 - 1757. It acquired at this time a silver altarpiece for the main altar; this was melted down by the Napoleonic authorities during the Cisalpine Republic.

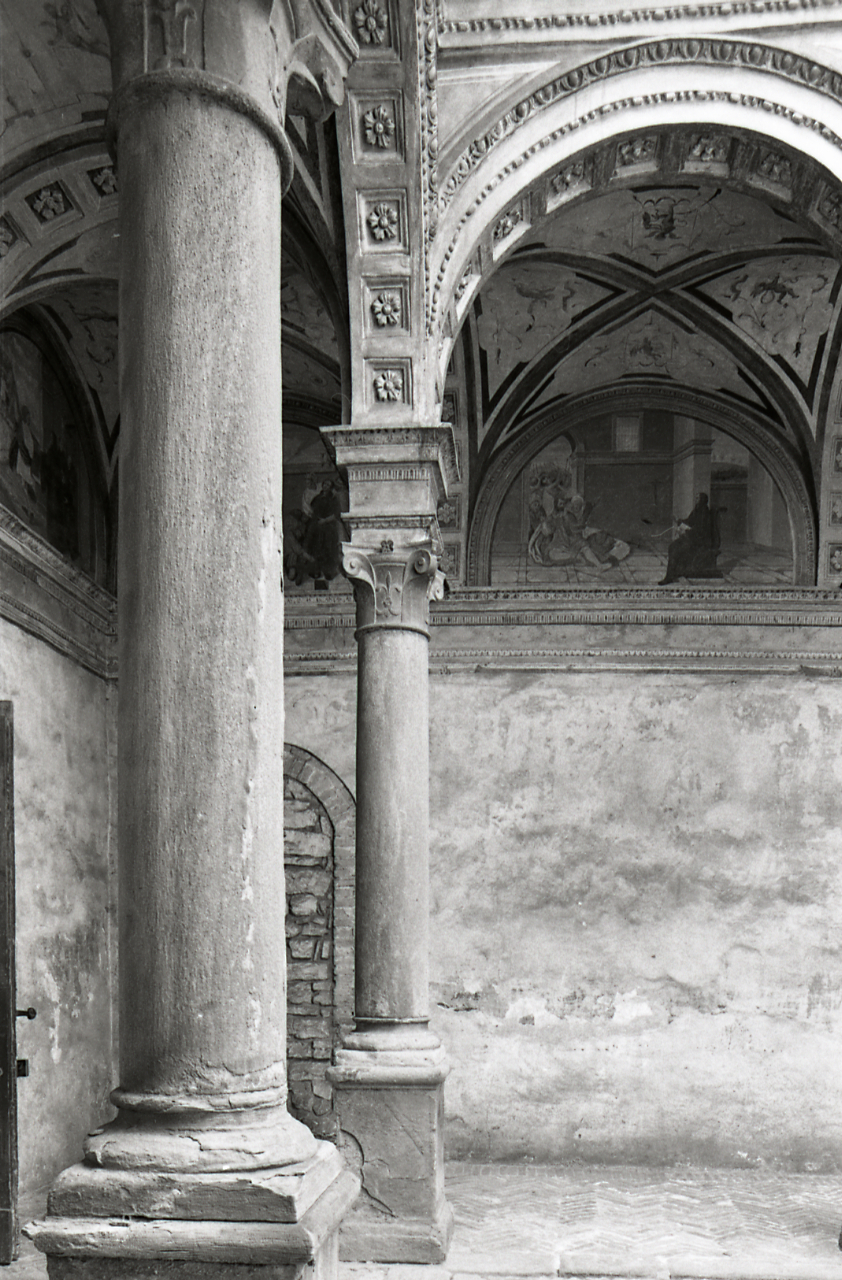
Photo by Paolo Monti, 1980

The two main altarpieces depicting the Assumption of the Virgin by Giovanni Battista Moroni and San Stefano by Calisto Piazza were transferred to the Pinacoteca Brera in Milan. The monks still remained in the monastery, restoring the convent to life in 1827. In 1841 a new marble altar was completed by Giacomo Bianconi. The walls still retain the Renaissance-style frescoes.

Further reconstructions occurred in the 20th and 21st centuries. The adjacent cloistered convent of the Benedictines, still active, has been recently restored.

== See also ==
- 16th-century Western domes
