= Stavroula Pantazopoulou =

Greek and Canadian civil engineer

Stavroula John "Voula" Pantazopoulou is a Greek and Canadian civil engineer whose research concerns earthquake engineering and the performance of concrete under stress and corrosion, as well as novel formulations of concrete that incorporate nanomaterials and industrial waste. She is a professor in the Department of Civil Engineering at York University in Toronto.

== Education and career ==
Pantazopoulou received a bachelor's degree in civil engineering from the National Technical University of Athens in 1982. She continued her studies at the University of California, Berkeley, where she received a master's degree in 1984 and a Ph.D., completed in 1987. Her dissertation, Three-dimensional aspects of the behavior of R/C structures subjected to earthquakes, was supervised by Jack Moehle.

After postdoctoral research at UC Berkeley, she worked in Canada at the University of Toronto, where she was promoted to associate professor in 1993. She became a full professor at the Democritus University of Thrace in 2000, and subsequently professor and department head at the University of Cyprus, before returning to Canada as a professor at York University in 2016.

== Recognition ==
A paper of Pantazopoulou and Beatriz M. Martin-Perez won the 1999 Moisseiff Award of the American Society of Civil Engineers.

Pantazopoulou became a Fellow of the American Concrete Institute in 2004, a Fellow of the Engineering Institute of Canada in 2019, and a Fellow of the Canadian Academy of Engineering in 2024.
