= Alessio Tramello =

Italian architect (1455–1535)

Alessio Tramello (1455–1535) was an Italian Renaissance architect who mostly designed churches and civic works.

He began his activity in Piacenza and his work uses forms of Gothic architecture. Two works from Piacenza stand out in design. The first, Santa Maria di Campagna was built (1522–1528), in an example of symmetric centrally-planned Renaissance architecture. He also directed design of the church of San Sisto (1499–1511).
