= Tas-de-charge =

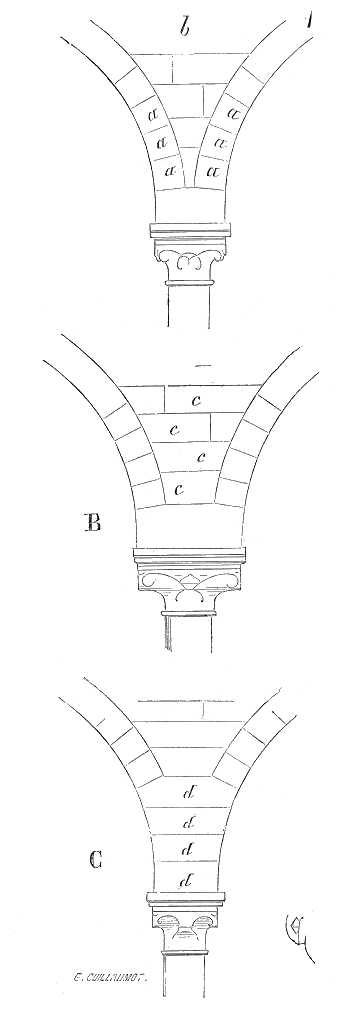
Arch C has a tas-de-charge

In architecture, tas-de-charge is a French term, also used in English, given to the lower courses of ribs of a Gothic vault, which are laid in horizontal courses and bonded into the wall, forming a solid mass. This helps bond the ribs, vault and walls together. They generally rise about one-third of the height of the vault, and as they project forwards they lessen the span to be vaulted over.
