= Emilio Perinetti =

Italian painter

Emilio Perinetti (1852 in Piacenza – 1936 in Castell’Arquato, Province of Piacenza) was an Italian painter. He painted mostly within his native province in religious subjects and private commissions.

== Biography ==
Perinetti initially enrolled at the Istituto Gazzola in Piacenza. After 1866, he worked under Lorenzo Toncini, and after 1872 with Bernardino Pollinari. Author of portraits and sacred subject, landscapes, and still lifes. Among his works: Martyrdom of St Bartholemew (1895) for the church of Macerato di Perino; in 1897, he decorated a room in the ground floor of Casa Gianelli in via Giordani at Piacenza; two ovals Sant’Alfredo and Santa Rosa (1920) for the Oratory of the Santissima Annunziata at Lugagnano; in 1929 and 1930, he completed two other ovals Holy Family and a Santa Filomena. In 1882, in collaboration with Francesco Ghittoni, a fellow student at the Institute Gazzola, he painted the first ten stations of the Via Crucis of the church of Vigolo Marchese. In 1903 he completed restorations in Piacenza: while Perinetti restored the frescoes by De Longe in the presbytery of San Lorenzo, while Ghittoni restored the two pendants by Gaspare Landi in the presbytery of the cathedral.
