= Bozzini =

Bozzini may refer to:

== People ==
- Luigia Bozzini (19th century), Italian painter, daughter of Paolo Bozzini
- Paolo Bozzini (1815–1892), Italian painter, father of Luigia Bozzini
- Philipp Bozzini (1773–1809), German physician

== Other ==
- Quatuor Bozzini, Canadian string quartet
