= Luigi Tosti (sculptor) =

Italian sculptor

Luigi Tosti (Piacenza, 1845 - ) was an Italian sculptor.

He first studied in the studio of a sculptor named Gregori, then he enrolled to study design at the Istituto Gazzola, under the direction of Giuseppe Giorgi (also called Pietrogiorgi) to become a designer of ornamentation. After learning disegno, also showed skill in figure painting, and he apprenticed with professor Lorenzo Toncini, who recommended him to try his had at sculpting. Using a stipend from the Gazzola Institute, he came to Florence, where at the first year of his studies, he exhibited two busts: one of a woman peasant, the other a portrait of Melchiorre Gioia; afterwards he completed a full-size statue of Torquato Tasso, and designs a monument to painter Gaspare Landi. But to have the Istituto Gazzola continue his pension, he sent a San Sebastiano back, in a life-size bas-relief. At the Mostra of Florence, he exhibited: Le Vergognosa, which was awarded a silver medal. He then traveled to Rome, where he was commissioned a bust of il Giordani; then traveled to United States.
