= Giacomo Bertucci =

Italian painter (1903–1982)

Giacomo Bertucci (16 August 1903 – 10 August 1982) was an Italian painter, mainly of genre paintings.

== Biography ==
Born in Bardi, but he mainly lived in Milan. He studied at the Istituto Tecnico of Piacenza, then at the Istituto Gazzola, where he was a pupil of Francesco Ghittoni. He then moved to Milan, where he worked most of his adult life, and then became an instructor at the Brera Academy, until he was called to substitute for Umberto Concerti in teaching figure painting at the Gazzola. He exhibited at both Piacenza and Milan. Painting landscapes, house portraits, and still-lives. He died in Milan. One of his works is on display at the Galleria Ricci Oddi of Piacenza.
