= Giovanni Bernardino Pollinari =

Italian painter (1813–1896)

Giovanni Bernardino Pollinari (February 27, 1813 – October 5, 1896) was an Italian painter, mainly of historic and sacred canvases, as well as portraits.

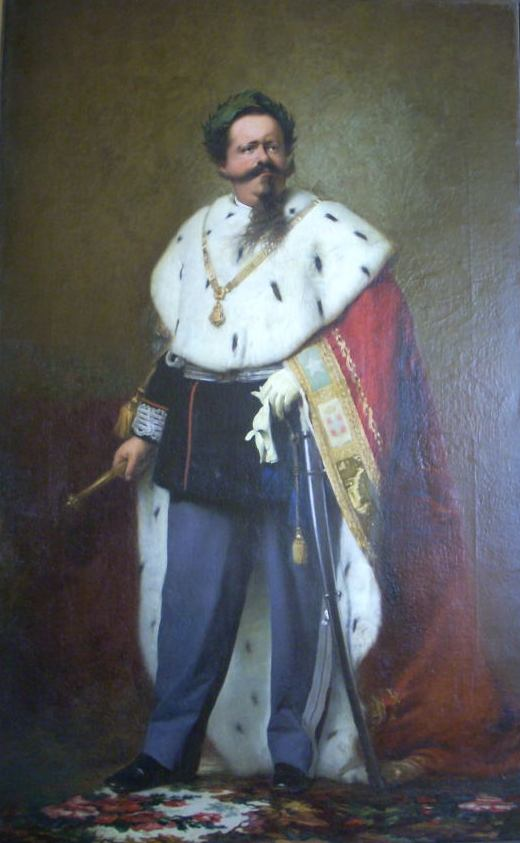
Portrait of Victor Emanuele II

== Biography ==
Pollinari began his studies at the Istituto Gazzola in his native Piacenza, under Giuseppe Gherardi (or Girardi), and then of Antonio Gemmi. Under the patronage of Marchese Bernardino Mandelli, in 1824 Pollinari moved to Rome, where he worked in the studios of the leaders of the neoclassical style including Minardi, Camuccini, and Landi. He painted an Immaculate Conception for the church of San Raimondo in Piacenza. He also painted the sipario (stage curtain) of the (Teatro Filodrammatico di Piacenza), depicting: Alessandro Farnese receives ambassadors from the city during the Siege of Antwerp completed by commission of the società d'incoraggiamento di Parma. Among his other works are: Vignola presents his design for the Palazzo Farnese to Margherita d'Austria and La potestà delle chiavi. He painted life-size portraits of King Vittorio Emanuele. The Galleria d'arte moderna Ricci Oddi displays his portrait of the Family of Antonio Francischelli. Pollinari himself became professor of the Istituto Gazzola in Piacenza. One of his pupils was Emilio Perinetti.
