= The Victorious Hannibal Seeing Italy from the Alps for the First Time =

1770–1771 painting by Francisco Goya

- Aníbal vencedor que por primera vez mira Italia desde los Alpes (Spanish)
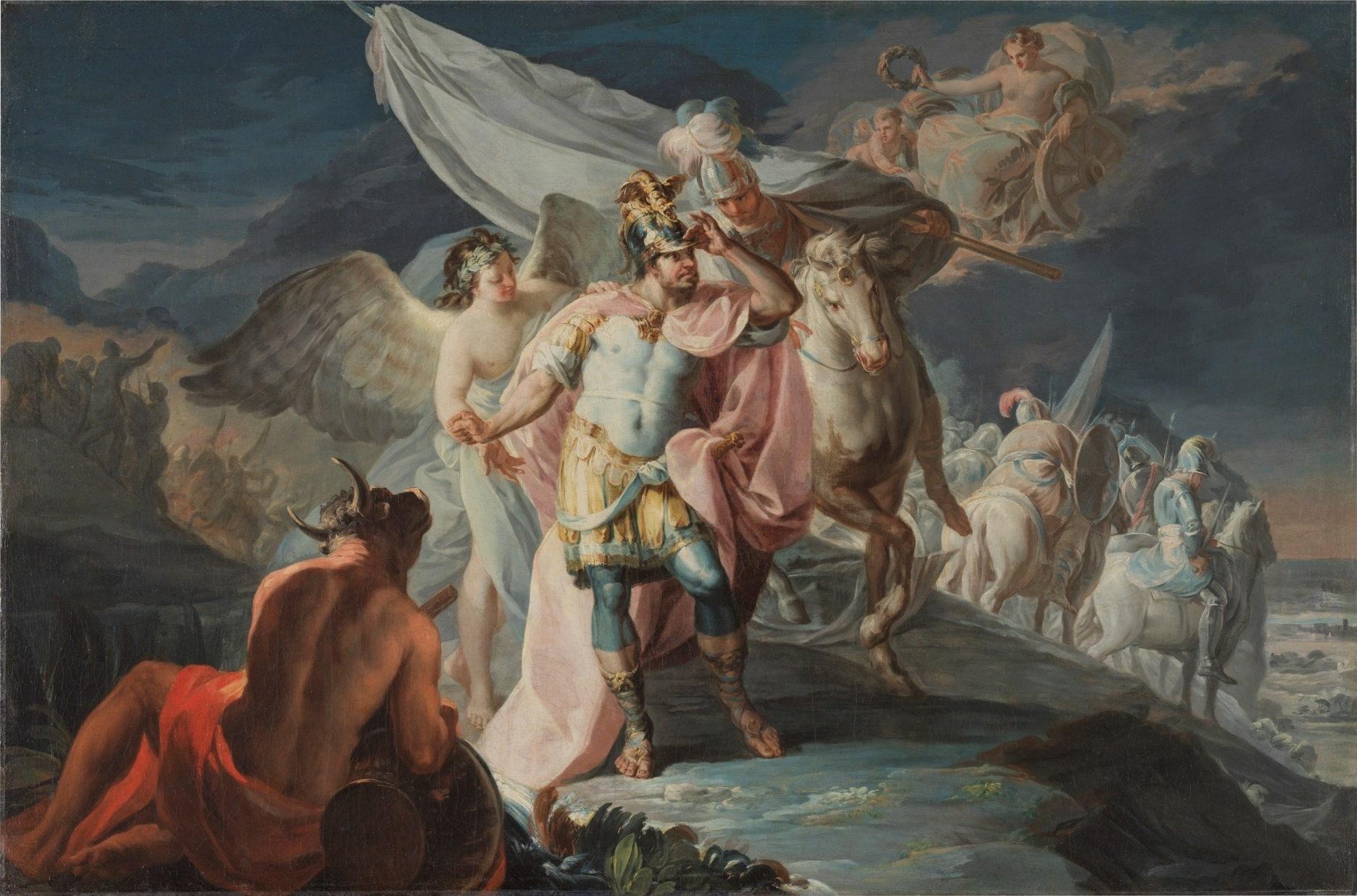
- Artist: Francisco Goya
- Completion date: 1770–1771
- Medium: oil on canvas
- Dimensions: 88,3 × 133 cm
- Location: Prado Museum, Madrid

The Victorious Hannibal Seeing Italy from the Alps for the First Time, or Hannibal the victor crossing the Alps, or Hannibal the victorious from the heights of the Alps looks out over the plains of Italy (Spanish: Aníbal vencedor que por primera vez mira Italia desde los Alpes) is an oil painting by Spanish painter Francisco Goya, dating from his early years. It is the oldest documented work by the painter.

The painting was created during Goya's stay in Italy in 1770–1771, for a competition announced by the Academy of Fine Arts in Parma. It takes up a historical theme related to the figure of Hannibal – the commander of the armies of ancient Carthage, who crossed the Alps with his army in the third century BC with the intention of conquering Roman Italy. The artist carefully followed the rules given by the academy for depicting the subject, made numerous preparatory drawings and at least two oil sketches. The painting, located in the collection of the Selgas-Fagalde Foundation, was wrongly attributed to Corrado Giaquinto; Goya's attribution was not confirmed until 1993. As of April 2021, the work is part of the Prado collection. A copy is in a private collection in Barcelona. Despite the availability of many sketches and radiographic studies made, not all art critics agree on the authenticity of this painting.

== Circumstances of creation ==
During the years 1770–1771, Goya stayed in Italy, where he honed his painting skills. He was then a young and still unknown artist seeking validation of his talent and a path to fame. Before his departure to Italy, he attempted to gain entry into the Real Academia de Bellas Artes de San Fernando in Madrid, but he faced failure in two consecutive competitions held by the academy. Probably due to the intervention of José Nicolás de Azara, Goya was admitted to the prestigious competition for young artists announced by the Academy of Fine Arts in Parma in May 1770. It is also possible that he learned about the competition from Gesualdo di Giacomo, a Sicilian painter he met in Rome, who also participated in it. Goya probably hoped that recognition from the Italian institution (especially the Parma academy, which enjoyed the patronage of Philip Bourbon, brother of the Spanish king Charles III) would help him in his career upon his return to his homeland, and perhaps even pave the way for work at the royal court.

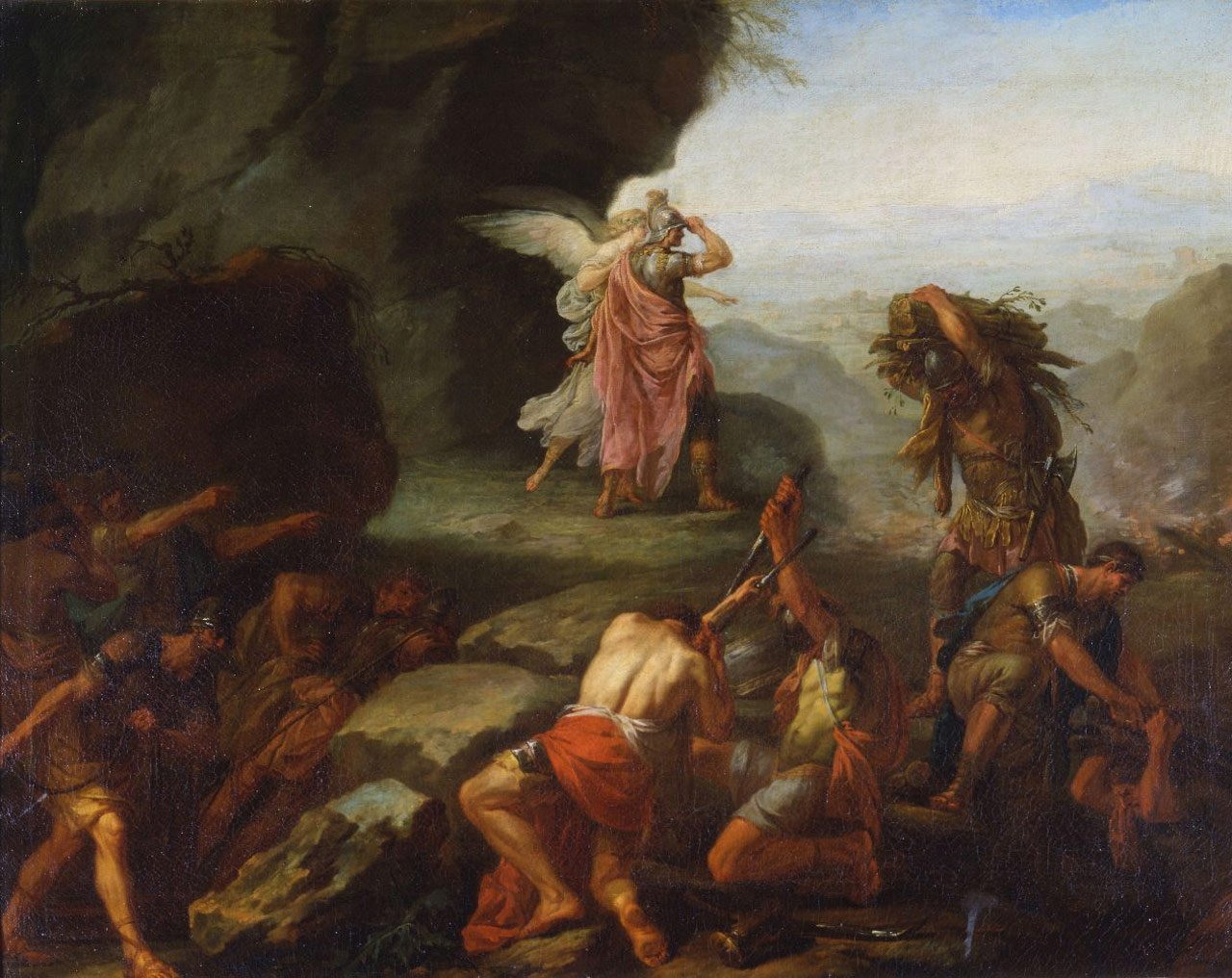
The painting by Paolo Borroni on the same subject, which won the competition at the Academy of Fine Arts in Parma

The painting submitted for the competition was also supposed to be accompanied by an appropriate motto, and the artist was required to include in the letter their country of origin and the name of the master under whom they studied. While in Rome, on 20 April 1771, Goya wrote a letter to the new secretary of the academy, Count Rezzonico, informing him of the submission of his painting to the competition. In the letter, he embellished his origins and introduced himself as Francesco Goia, a Roman, and a pupil of the court painter Francesco Vayeu (Francisco Bayeu). He adorned his submission with a motto taken from the Aeneid: Iam tandem Italiae fugientis prendimus oras (At last we seize the shores of Italy, which ever flee us, [...]). (Note: Virgil, Aeneid, Book VI, translated by Tadeusz Karyłowski.) This was considered an apt choice of quotation for a painter whose journey to Italy also required many hardships and sacrifices, as well as a reference to Hannibal, who arrived in Italy ready to conquer it, just as Goya aimed to conquer it with his painting. The quote from Virgil and the flawlessly written letter in Italian suggest that he received assistance from José Nicolás de Azara. José de la Quadra, ambassador of King Charles III in Parma, could also have provided him with support.

The mandatory theme of the competition was a historical scene depicting Hannibal gazing upon Roman Italy, which he was soon to attack. Four paintings participated in the competition (besides Goya, Pierre du Hallas, Gesualdo di Giacomo, and Paolo Borroni competed), which were exhibited in the academy's salon during June 1771. Goya's painting received six positive votes from the commission but did not win the competition. It received an honorable mention, praising Goya for his ease with the brush, the countenance and posture of Hannibal, and the majesty with which he portrayed the ancient leader. However, the commission was not satisfied with the color scheme and composition, noting that if the colors were more realistic and the composition closer to the requirements, Goya would have had a chance of winning. The first prize, in the form of a gold medal, was awarded to the Italian Paolo Borroni, who studied at the academy under the guidance of Benigno Bossi (a member of the jury) and had received the second prize the previous year. According to Arturo Ansón Navarro, the award was unjustly given to a local painter. Goya's painting surpassed the winning work in quality and better fulfilled the competition's conditions. Goya's name was mentioned in the Diario Ordinario de Roma on 3 August 1771, and in the prestigious literary magazine Le Mercure de France in January 1772 (where it was incorrectly stated that he had won the second prize).

== Description ==
In the Parma competition, in addition to the theme of the victorious Hannibal seeing Italy from the Alps for the first time, certain compositional elements were imposed: Hannibal was to be depicted raising the visor of his helmet and turning to the winged genius who takes him by the hand; he sees from afar the beautiful landscape of distant Italy, and in his eyes and whole face there is revealed an inner joy and noble confidence in further victories. Such a depiction of the African chieftain can be found in the sonnet Annibale vincitore (Note: Ferocemente la visiera bruna / alzo sull’Alpe l’Affrican Guerriero / cui la vittrici militar fortuna / splendea negli atti del semblante altero [...]. Carlo Innocenzo Frugoni, Annibale vincitore, Sonnet VIII.) by Italian poet Carlo Innocenzo Frugoni, who was secretary of the academy until 1768. The theme of the competition was intended as a tribute to the late poet. Also the dimensions of the painting (88.3 × 133 cm) correspond exactly to the requirements from the competition.

Goya had limited access to sources describing the figure of Hannibal, and it is possible that he used the resources of the library of José Nicolas de Azara. He complied with the requirements of the academy and depicted the figure of the leader in a poetic manner, giving his person and actions a nobility. Hannibal stands upright on a rocky outcrop and, lifting his helmet slightly, looks confidently ahead. He had just traveled the long and hard road from Spain through the Pyrenees, where he had lost part of his army due to the low temperatures and difficult terrain. Now he has crossed the chain of the Alps and is looking at Italy for the first – his face expresses awe and amazement. He seems to have just realized his accomplishment and nothing can stop him from conquering Rome. His right hand is clenched in a gesture that indicates his will to win. Hannibal's helmet is decorated with the motif of drac alat – a winged dragon, the heraldic emblem of the kings of Aragon, which Goya knew from the coat of arms of Zaragoza. The winged figure of a genius, in a theatrical gesture, wraps an arm around the leader and points him to the Italian landscape, invisible in the painting. A rider in a helmet adorned with feathers holds a giant wind-moved flag and leans toward him. A shield – an attribute of the victorious leader – can be seen behind the horse's legs. Part of Hannibal's cavalry is slowly making its way toward the valley, and the outline of the battle can be seen on the left.

Goya also introduced two allegorical figures that reflect the geography of the depicted scene and emphasize the outcome of the battles led by Hannibal. Against the cloudy sky, approaching in her chariot, is Victoria – the goddess of victory and glory, also identified as Fortuna, who directs human destinies, accompanied by a putto carrying a sheaf of wheat. In her hands, she holds a laurel wreath, which she intends to adorn the victorious leader with. One of her hands rests on a wheel, which may signify the fickleness of fortune and Hannibal's tragic end. This element was borrowed from the works of Corrado Giaquinto. In the foreground, facing away from the viewer and closing the composition, is a figure representing the allegory of the longest river in Italy – the Po. Presented according to the iconography of Lombardy by the Italian writer Cesare Ripa, the figure, with a muscular male silhouette and a bull's head, pours water from a tilted amphora, symbolizing the valley of the river.

== Preparatory sketches ==
The work on the painting lasted about a year and was preceded by the creation of numerous preparatory sketches, which allow for a better understanding of Goya's creative process. In the collections of the Prado Museum, there is an Italian sketchbook of the painter, called Cuaderno italiano, containing numerous drawings and notes by Goya from his trip to Italy. It includes five drawings considered sketches for various motifs of The Victorious Hannibal.... In addition to the general composition sketch in vertical format, it also contains sketches of Hannibal's silhouette, a genius, a bull's head, and ancient armor. A sanguine drawing depicting the competition composition horizontally is located below the mascaron drawing. Initially, Goya sketched the genius leading Hannibal by the hand, according to the academy's description. However, in the final work, it is Hannibal who is at the center of attention, with the genius standing behind him, pointing out the landscape of Italy.

Sketches from Cuaderno italiano

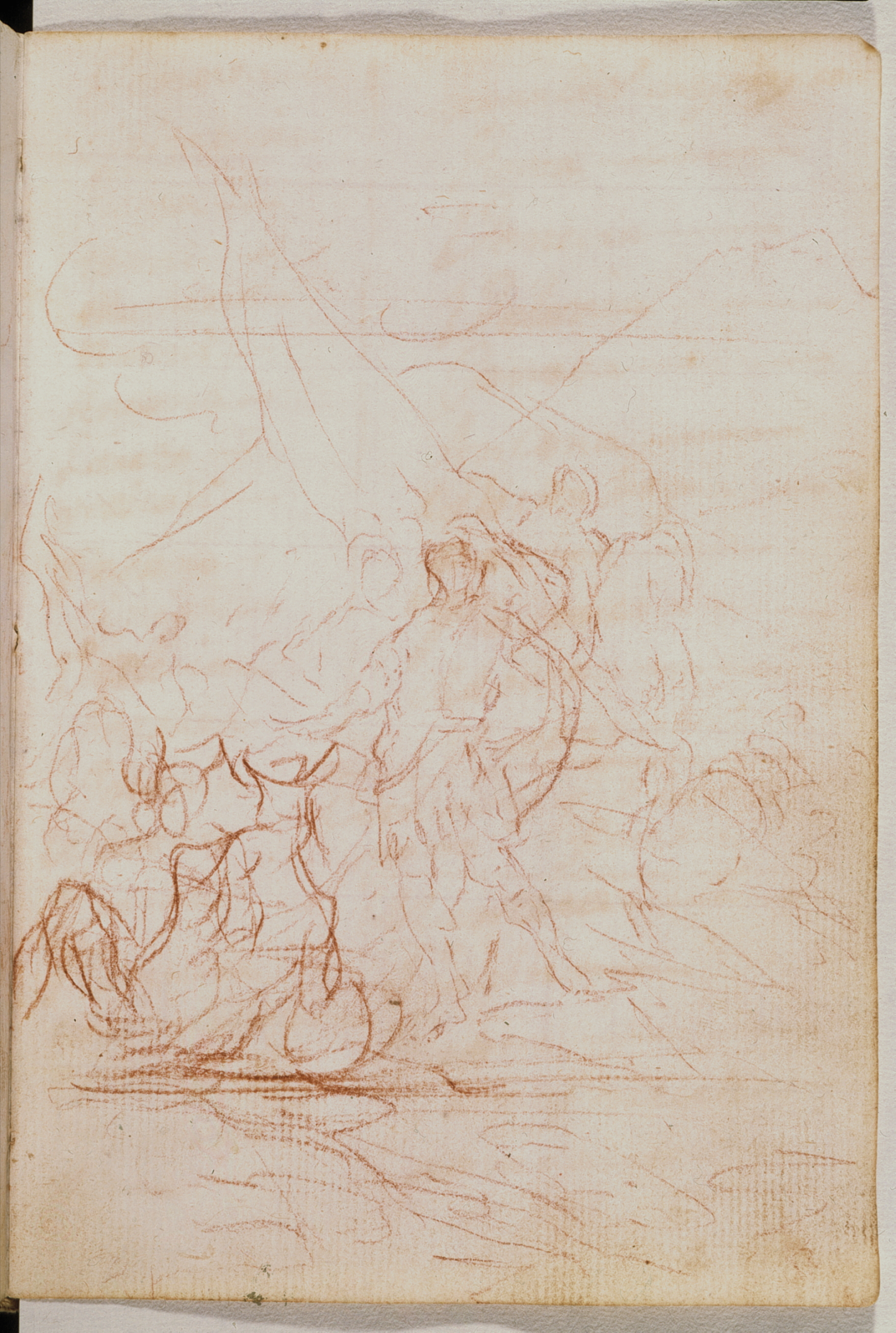
Composition sketch in vertical format (p. 37)

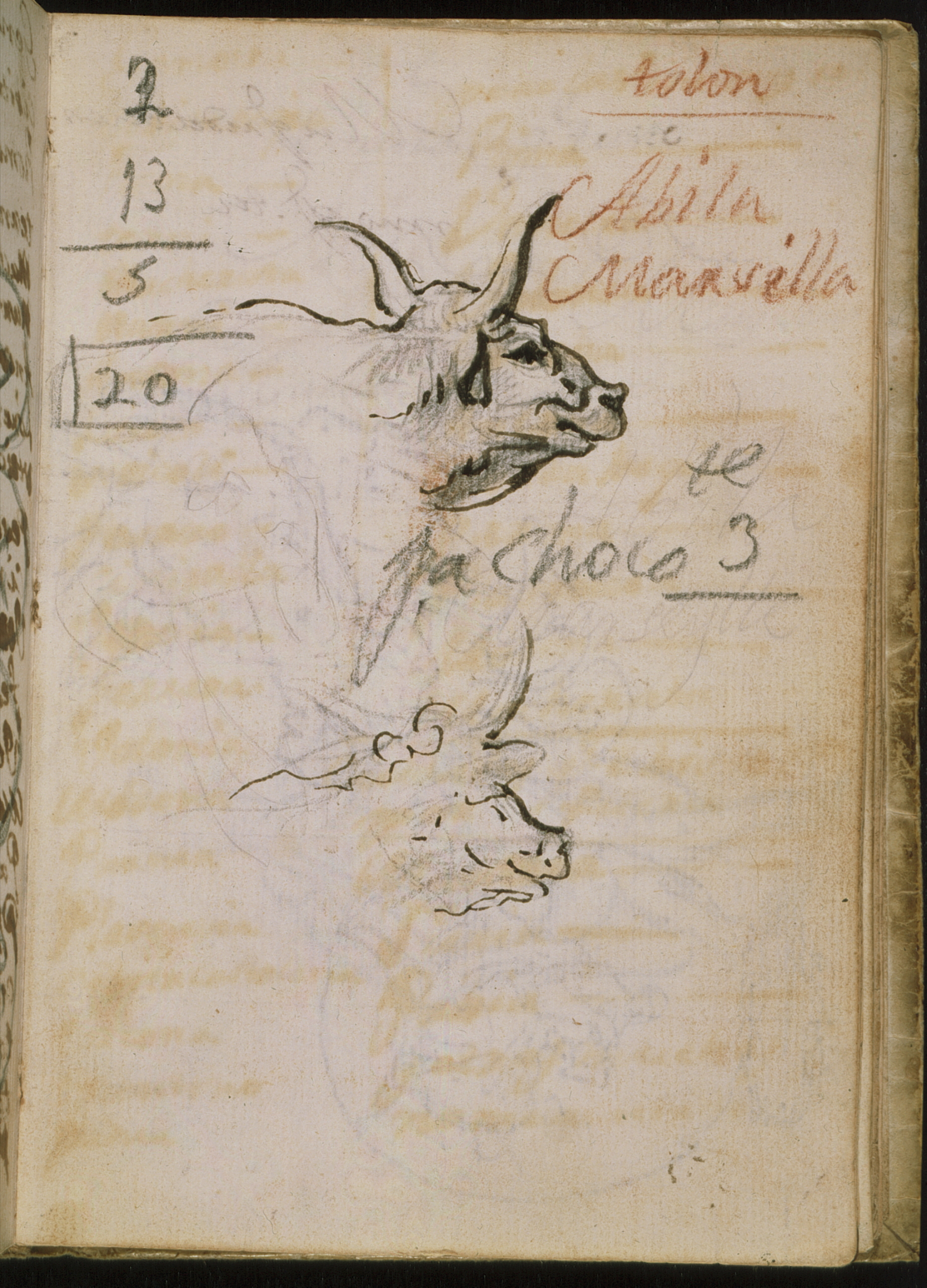
Sketch of the head of the Po River's personification

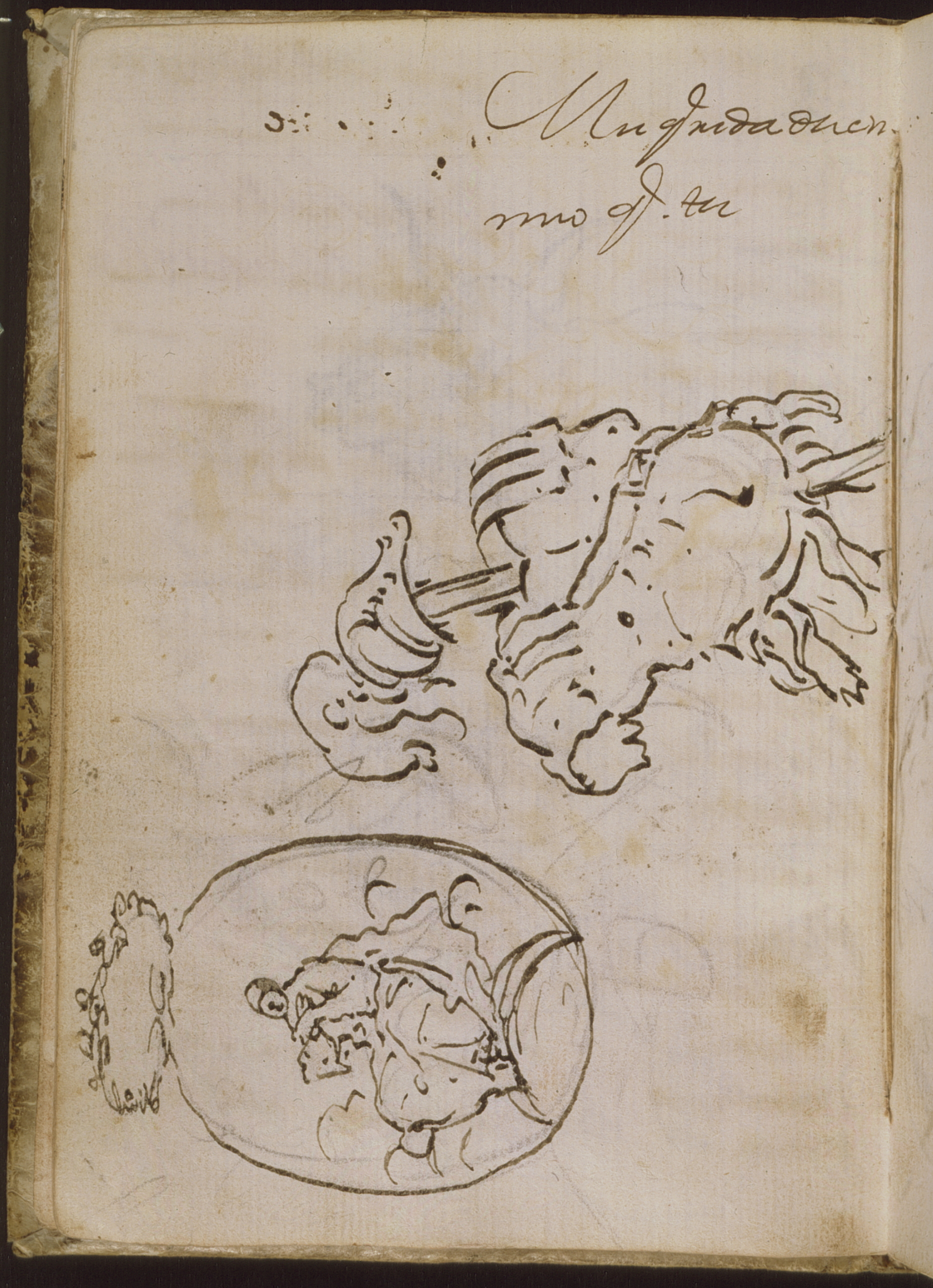
Sketch of Victoria and an armor (p. 42)

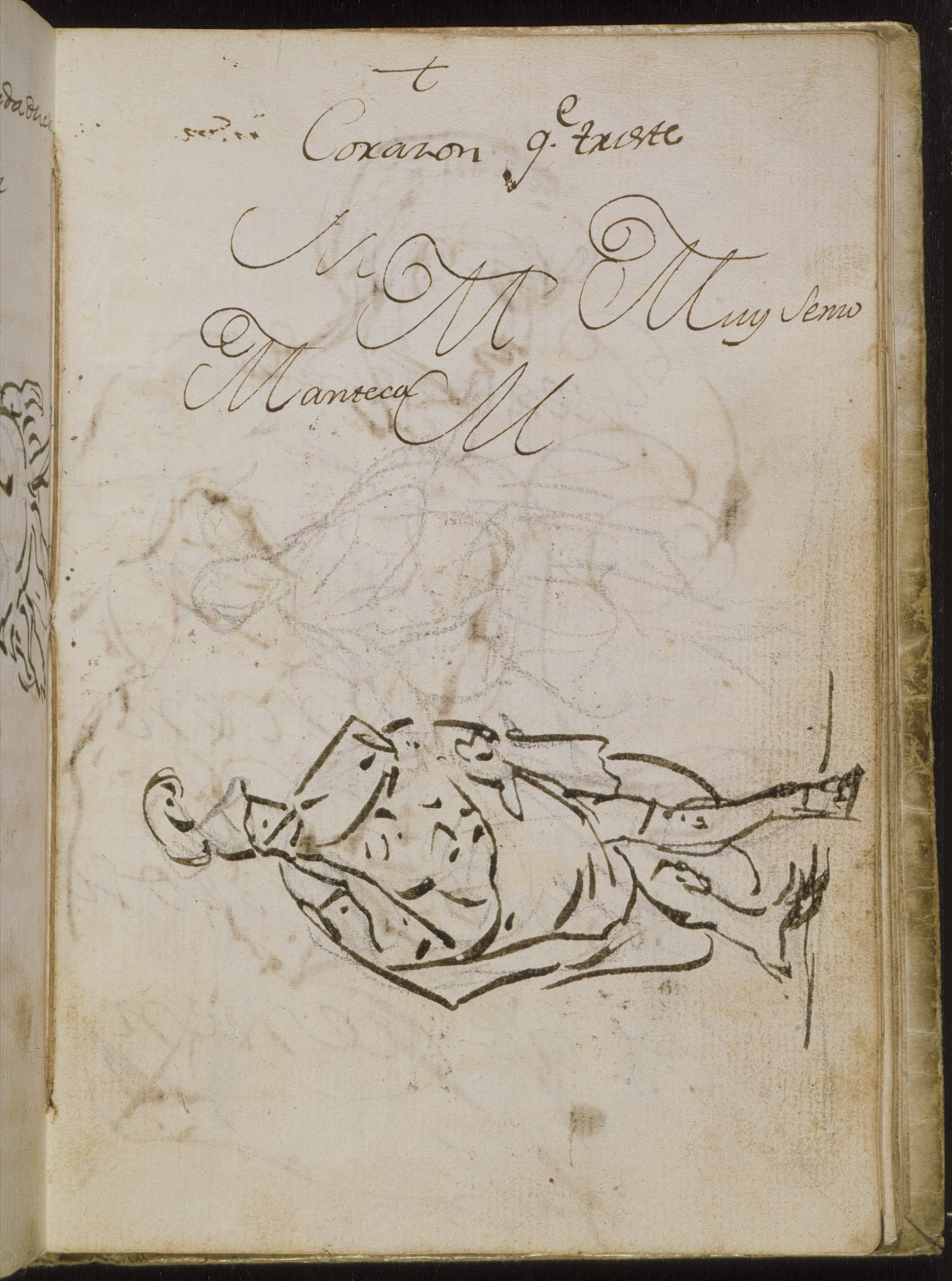
Sketch of Hannibal and the genius (p. 43)

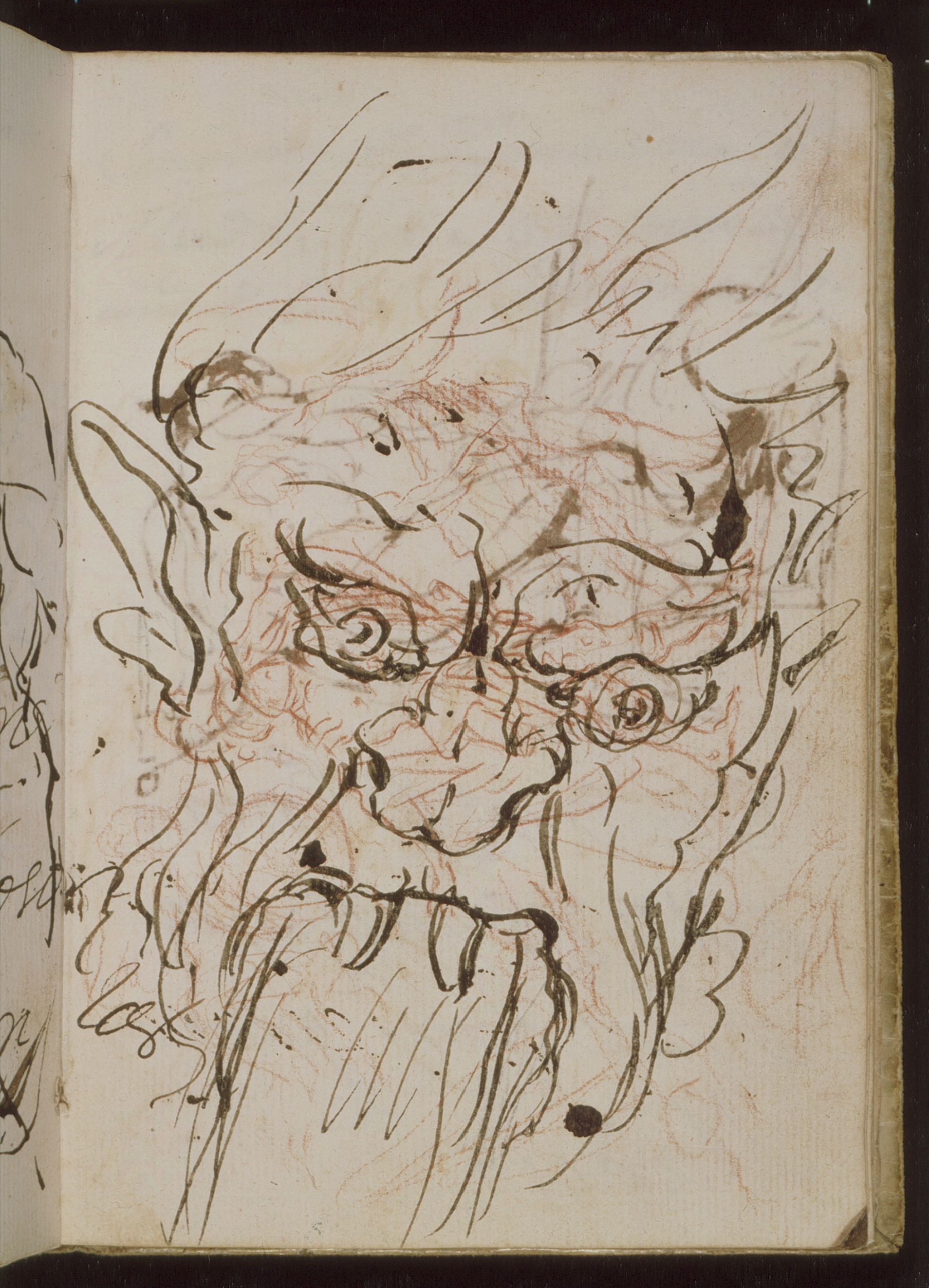
Sketch of a horizontal composition under the drawing of a mascaron (p. 45)

Two oil preparatory sketches for the artwork have also survived, differing from the final version in several details. In both sketches, the fantastical figure extending its hand to Hannibal has delicate butterfly wings. Radiographic studies of the final version of the work revealed that Goya initially painted such wings but later replaced them with larger angel wings. The war attributes – shield and banners – lie on the ground in the foreground, while in the final work, they are more hidden behind the horse's legs. The first sketch, signed "Goya" in the center at the bottom, also featured a severed head among the attributes, which is visible in the radiograph of the painting. The soldier, dismounting from the horse while holding a huge banner, gazes in the same direction as Hannibal, as if wanting to see what his leader admires in the distance. The allegorical figure of the Po seems unaware of the scene unfolding before it. In the final version, the symbolic figures play a larger role, and Victoria/Fortuna is also added, appearing in the sonnet. Removed is the figure next to the allegory of the Po. This figure is an old man with light hair wearing a laurel crown, holding a leader's staff, identified as a defeated barbarian from Alpine peoples who looks up towards the victorious Hannibal, or personification of the Alps. The color palette of the first sketch is much brighter and warmer than that which Goya applied in the second and final work, where it becomes softer and takes on an unreal character.

Oil sketches

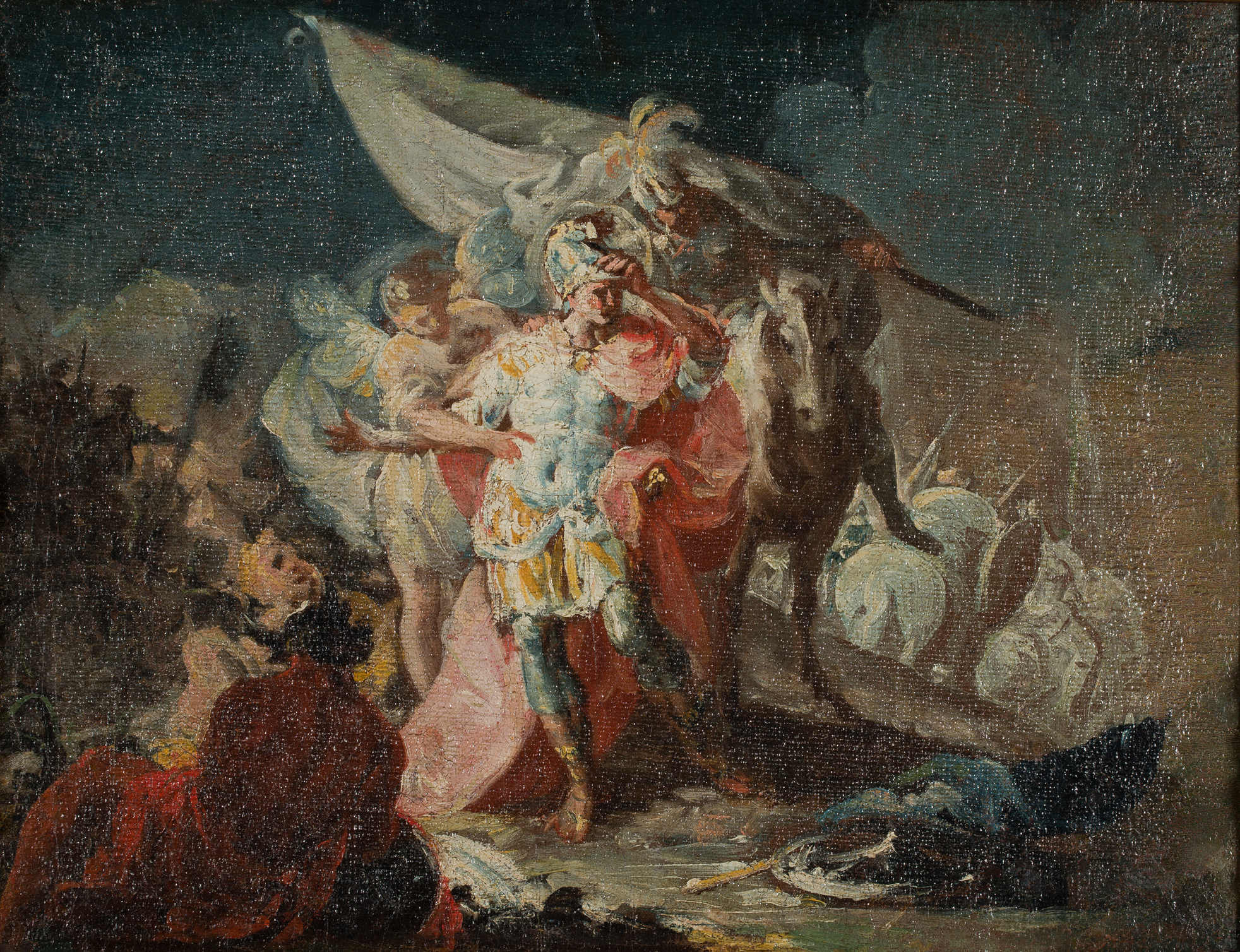
First preparatory sketch for the artwork, 30.5 × 38.5 cm, Zaragoza Museum

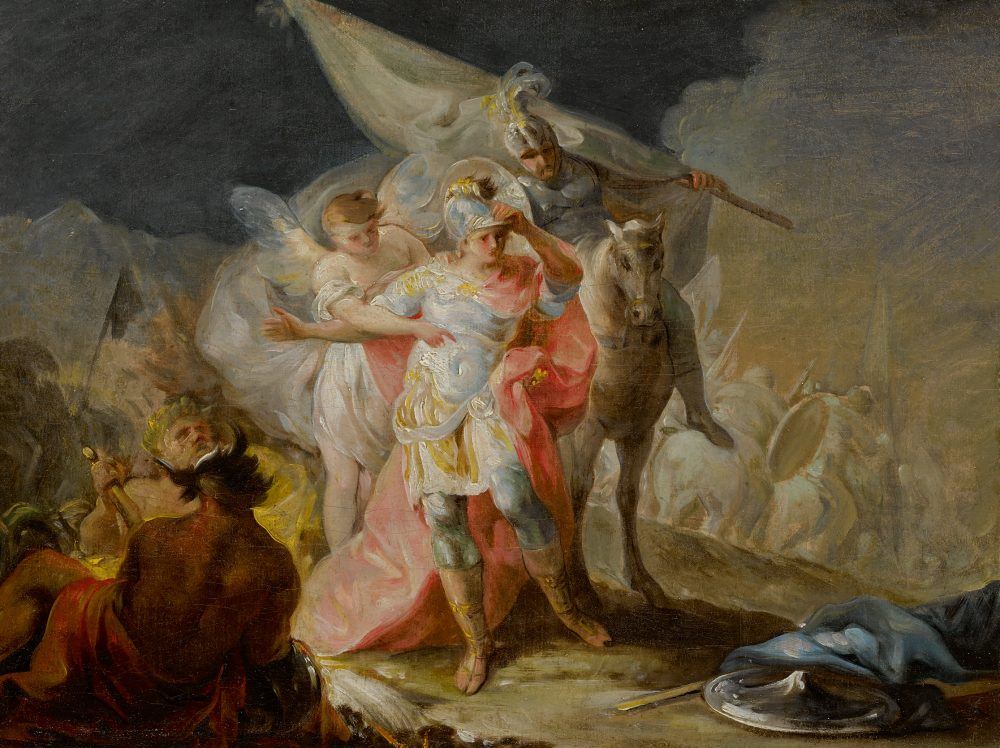
Second preparatory sketch, private collection, United States

The initial composition may have been inspired by José Arias' relief titled Construction of the Alcántara Bridge in Toledo. Arias received the first prize for this sculpture in 1766 at the competition organized by the Real Academia de Bellas Artes de San Fernando in Madrid. Goya also participated in this competition (in the painting category), so it is highly likely that he saw Arias' relief. It is possible that Goya made a sketch of the sculpture at that time, which he later used when painting his work. The figure of Emperor Trajan from the relief and Goya's Hannibal show significant similarities. However, there are obvious differences in the position and presentation of both figures. Juliet Wilson–Bareau points to a possible inspiration from the sculpture of Apollo Belvedere, which was a frequently used academic model from classical antiquity. Hannibal's posture, with the typical contrapposto and ancient stylization, was a common way of depicting mythical heroes and warriors in 18th-century painting. The allegory of the Po is probably inspired by the sculpture Dying Gaul seen from behind, which Goya knew from the Capitoline Museums. He used this model again a few years later when painting cartoons for tapestries, demonstrating his ability to render anatomy and refer to classicism. The group of riders with the banner was reused in the painting Saint Barbara, created shortly after the painter's return from Italy to Spain. Other possible sources of inspiration for the composition include the drawing by Gregorio Guglielmi Alexander at the Tomb of Achilles, Achille avvisato da Iride di tornare a combattere by Pietro Pasquale Ciaramponi, works by Tadeusz Kuntze for the arrangement of horse legs, and numerous works by Corrado Giaquinto.

== Technique ==
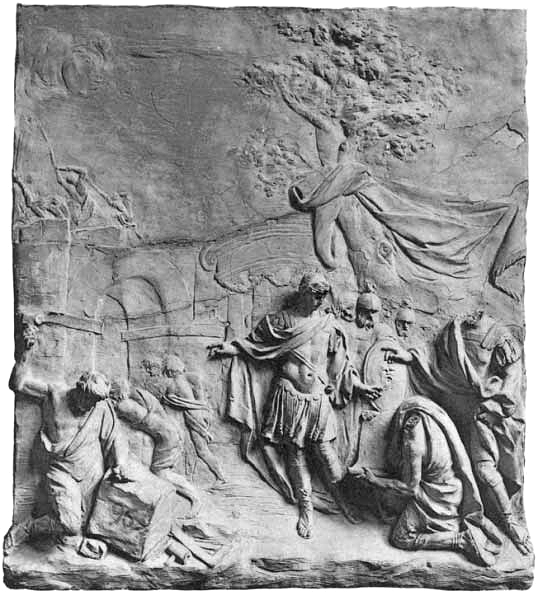
The Construction of the Alcántara Bridge in Toledo (1766), by José Arias. This work may have served as inspiration for Goya for the figure of Hannibal

Numerous preparatory sketches testify to how much effort the artist put into preparing the painting for the competition and the high hopes he had for it. The Victorious Hannibal... is an example of the Italian Rococo style and a technically refined work, which is evident in its harmonious composition, excellent use of light and confident brushstrokes modeling the figures and colors. The color palette used is dominated by shades of blue, delicate pinks and pearly grays, which express the classical yet unreal character of the scene, giving it a heroic tone. The first oil sketch was painted with Goya's typical vigorous brushstrokes. In the final work, the painter smoothed and cemented the brushstrokes, knowing the tastes of the academic jury that was to judge him. The color palette is also cooler, in the style of Corrado Giaquinto. According to Jesús Urrea, the cool colors give the impression that the depicted scene is playing out in the pale morning light.

== Provenance ==
The first biographers of Goya, Charles Yriarte and Laurent Matheron, noted his participation in the competition in Parma based on an article from Mercure de France from 1772, which was disseminated by the French art critic Paul Mantz in 1851. In 1928, Giovanni Copertini consulted the archives of the Academy of Fine Arts in Parma and described the competition in his work Note sul Goya. The academy typically retained only the work that won the competition. Based on correspondence from the Marquis de Felino, it is known that the painting The Victorious Hannibal... was rolled up and sent to Valencia in the second half of 1771, but at the painter's request, it was detained at the port in Genoa, and eventually sent to Zaragoza. For many years, it was considered a lost work. It did not appear in any sources until the mid-19th century when the historian and entrepreneur Fortunato de Selgas (1839–1921) acquired it in Madrid as a work by an unknown Italian painter. The painting adorned the Quinta de Selgas, residence of the Selgas family in El Pito, Asturias (now the headquarters of the Selgas-Fagalde Foundation). In 1993, Jesús Urrea, then deputy director of the Prado, identified the painting and attributed it to Goya. The Victorious Hannibal... was presented at an exhibition at the Prado the following year, and the museum officially confirmed the attribution of the work. The Selgas-Fagalde Foundation loaned the painting to the Prado in 2011, simultaneously committing the museum to its restoration. In April 2021, the Friends of the Prado Museum Foundation acquired this painting for 3.3 million euros to commemorate the 40th anniversary of its founding and to honor Francisco Calva Serraller, one of its founding members.

== See also ==
- List of works by Francisco Goya

== Bibliography ==
- Copertini, Giovanni (1928). Note sul Goya. Parma: Estatto dall’Annuario per l’Anno Scolastico 1926-1927 del R. Liceo Gimnasio Gian Domenico Romagnosi. p. 8.
- Soriano, Federico Torralba; Arnaiz, José Manuel (1986). "Anníbal cruzando los Alpes". Goya joven (1746–1776) y su entorno. Zaragoza: Museo e Instituto Camón Aznar. pp. 82–84. ISBN 978-0295976037.
- Kasl, Ronda; Stratton, Suzanne L. (1997). Painting in Spain in the Age of Enlightenment: Goya and His Contemporaries. Indianapolis Museum of Art. p. 102. ISBN 978-0295976037.
- Serraller, Francisco Calvo, ed. (2012). Goya y el infante don Luis: el exilio y el reino. Madrid: Patrimonio Nacional. p. 171. ISBN 978-8471204783.
- Stepanek, Stephanie; Ilchman, Frederick; Tomlinson, Janis; Ackley, Clifford; Braun, Jane (2014). Goya: Order & Disorder. Boston: Museum of Fine Arts in Boston. pp. 274–275. ISBN 978-0878468089.
- Aribau, Ferrán; Ruidera, Francesc; Altafuya, Lluís; Castillo, Roberto; Costaneda, Xavier (2006). Goya: su tiempo, su vida, su obra. Madrid: LIBSA. pp. 24, 203. ISBN 84-662-1405-4.
- Pancorbo, Alberto (2021). Cuarenta años de amistad. Donaciones de la Fundación Amigos del Museo del Prado. Madrid: Museo del Prado. ISBN 978-84-8480-560-1.
