= Pietro Antonio Avanzini =

Italian painter (1656–1733)

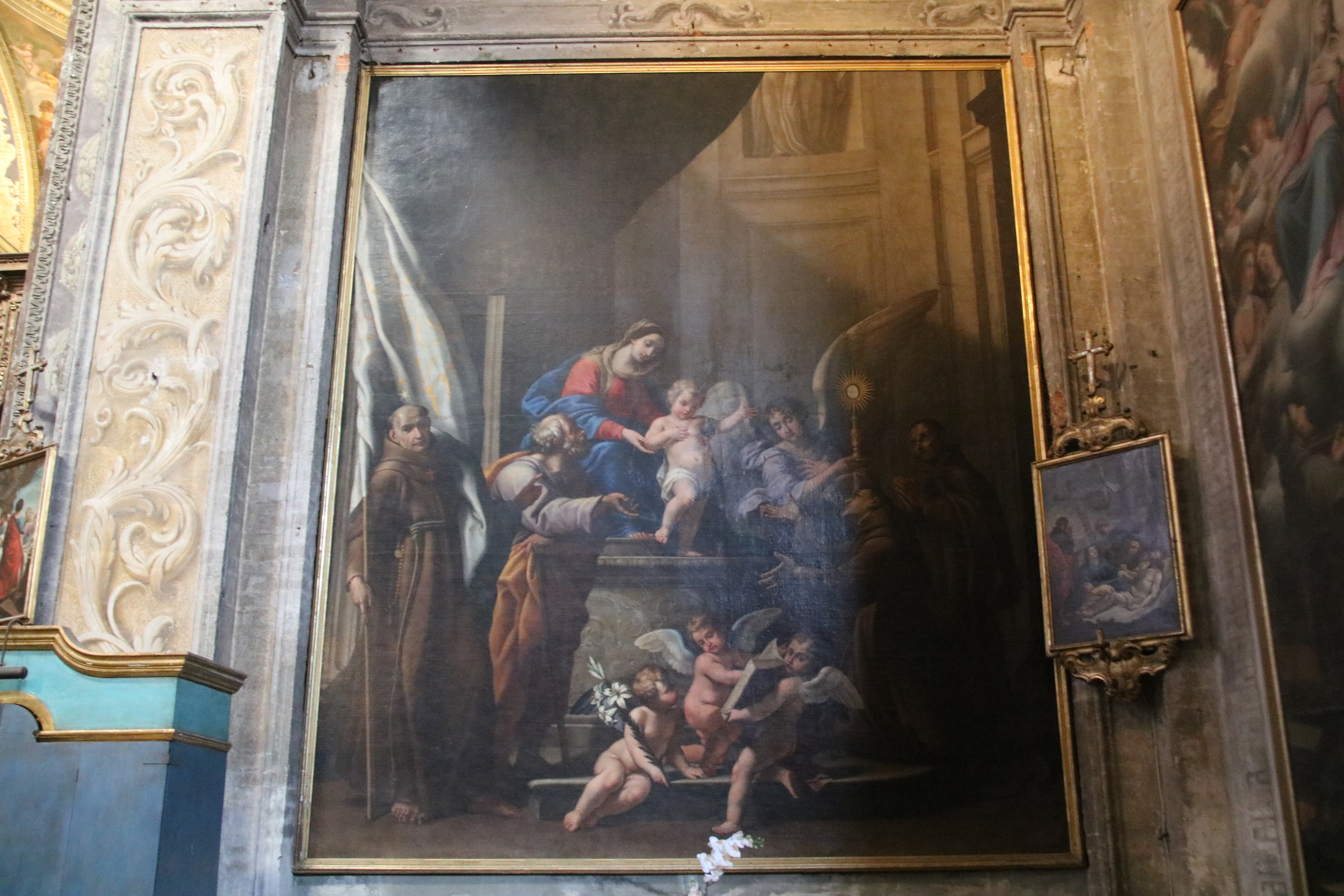
Pier Antonio Avanzini

Pietro Antonio Avanzini (1656–1733) was an Italian painter.

== Biography ==
He was born in Piacenza, trained by Marcantonio Franceschini in Bologna, and described as a painter of little originality, often copying his master's designs Among his works were some paintings in the Duomo of Piacenza, completed under his master in 1686. Also in Piacenza, for the chapel of Saint Bernardino da Siena in the church of Basilica di Santa Maria di Campagna, a Madonna and saints; and for the churches of San Giovanni in Canale, San Simone, San Protasio, and the Chiesa della Morte.
