= Santa Maria di Campagna, Piacenza =

Basilica church in Piacenza, Italy

Coordinates: 45.0565°N 9.6801°E

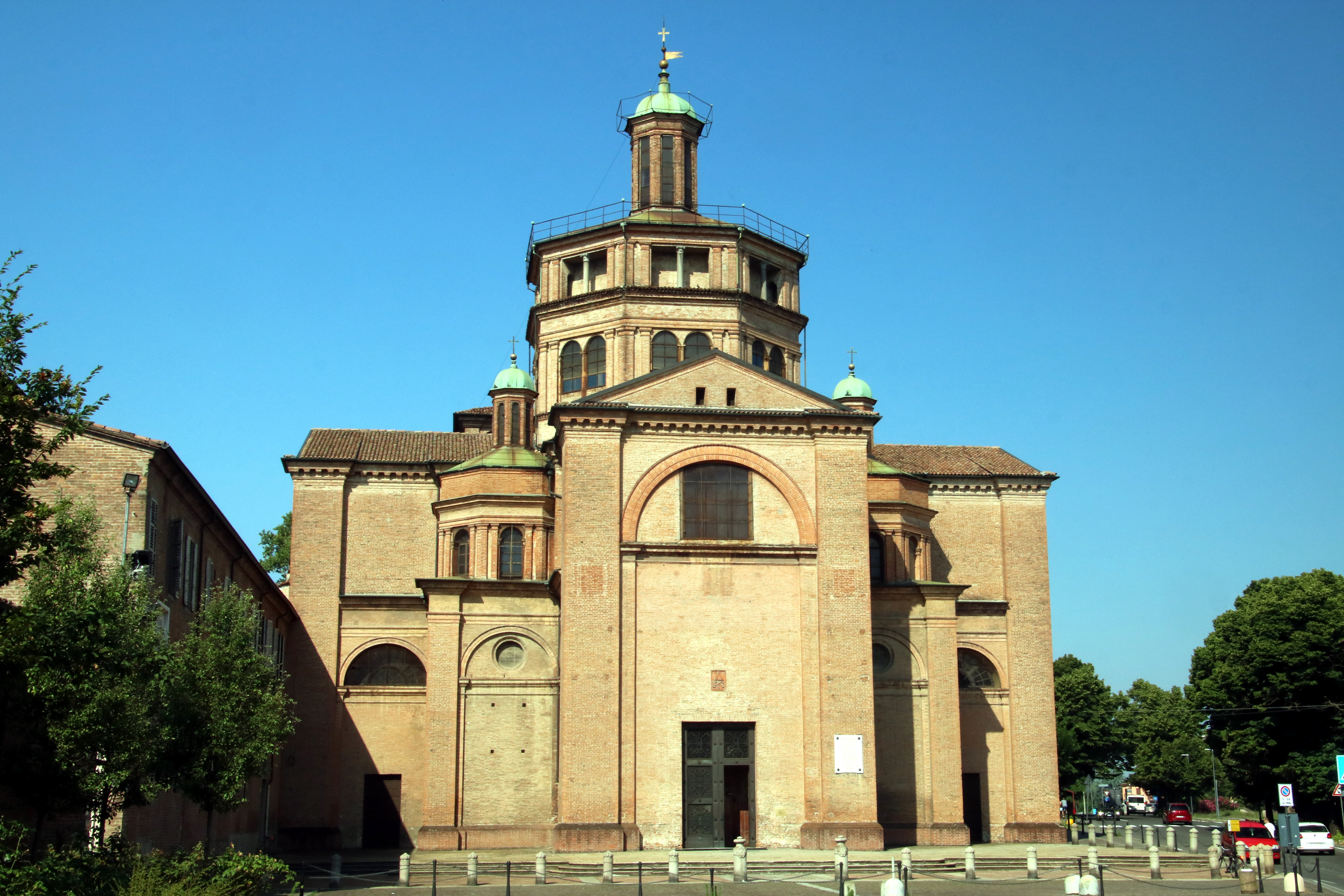
Basilica from the front

The Basilica of Santa Maria di Campagna is a Roman Catholic basilica church in the city of Piacenza in the Province of Piacenza, Italy. It was built in a Greek-Cross plan with an octagonal dome in a high Renaissance style in the 16th century.

== History ==
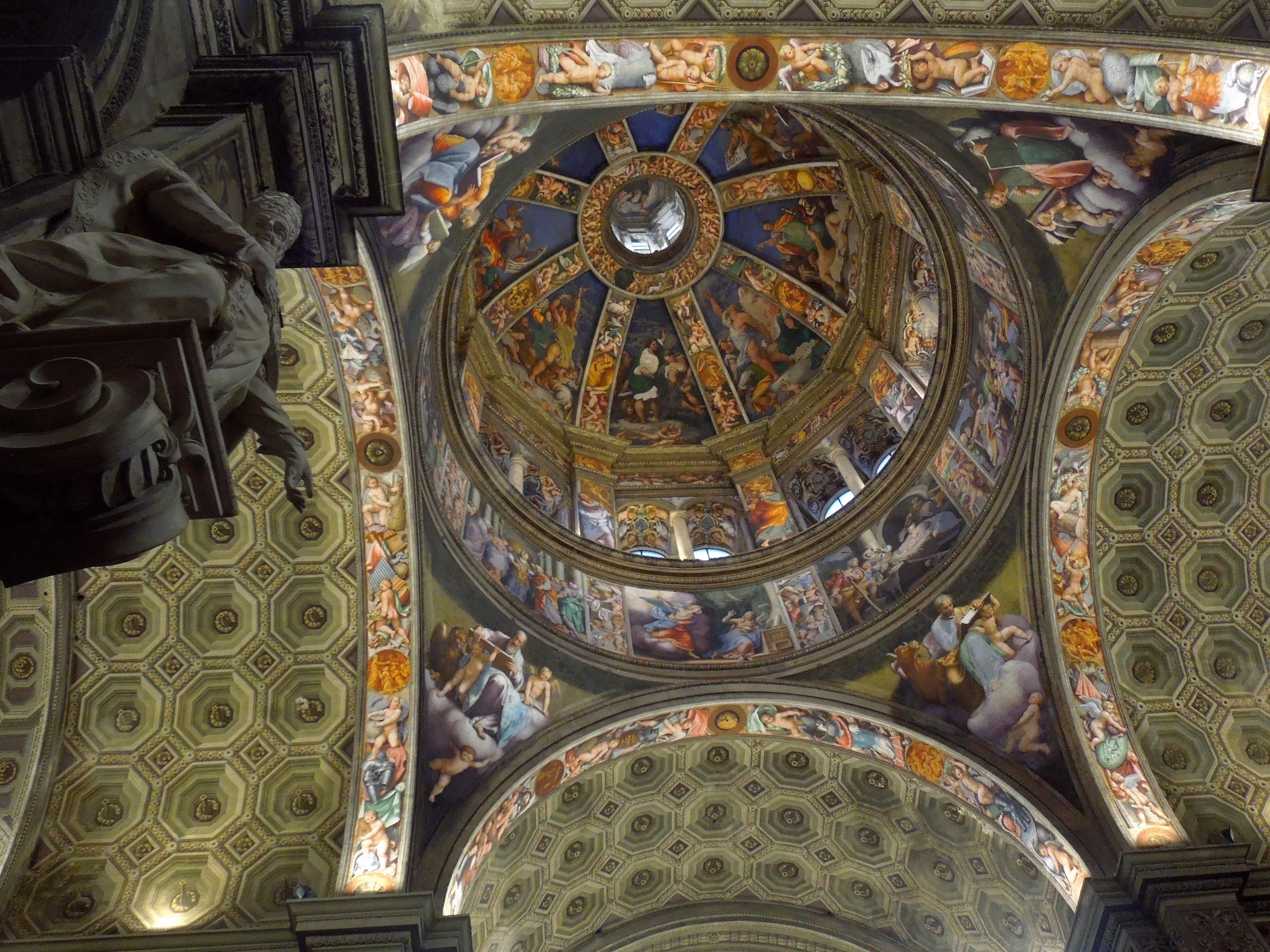
Frescoed dome of church

It was built in 1522–28, under the patronage of a local guild. The site had housed a sanctuary dedicated to Santa Maria di Campagnola, and housed a wooden image of the Madonna and Child from the 14th century. Tradition holds that Pope Urban II in 1095 announced the First Crusade from this site.

The architect of the Renaissance church was the native Alessio Tramello. Among the artists active inside the church were Camillo Procaccini, and Gaspare Traversi. The sacristy contains canvases by Gaspare Landi and Giulio Campi. The Chapel of Saint Anthony has works by Pietro Antonio Avanzini, Camillo Procaccini, and a member of the Galli-Bibiena Family. In the south transept are works of Alessandro Tiarini, Antonio Triva, and Ignazio Stern. The Chapel of Santa Vittoria Martire has works by Ferrante Moreschi, Bernardino Gatti (St George slaying the Dragon), Paolo Bozzini, Ludovico Pesci and Daniele Crespi. The nave ceiling has paintings by the 19th-century painter Giovanni Battista Ercole.

Among the masterpieces of the church are the frescoes by Giovanni Antonio Sacchi (Il Pordenone) and Bernardino Gatti in the cupola. They include depiction of the four evangelists in the spandrels. Pordenone also painted a fresco altarpiece in the Chapel of the Magi, depicting the arrival of the three Magi to visit the newborn Jesus. The Magi include a man of African descent and men dressed in elaborate Turkish garb. To the left of this fresco is another by the same artist depicting the Birth of the Virgin. Finally in the chapel of St Catherine are frescoes by Pordenone depicting St Catherine debates with the philosophers (Disputa di Santa Caterina) and the Mystical Marriage of St Catherine.

The marble pavement was completed by the Milanese artist, Giambattista Carrà (1595). The statue of Ranuccio I Farnese was carved in 1616 by the Baroque sculptor Francesco Mochi.

== See also ==
- 16th-century Western domes
