= Tosti =

Tosti is an Italian surname, a patronymic or plural form of Tosto.

It may refer to:

- Alejandro Tosti (born 1996), Argentine professional golfer
- Antonella Tosti, Italian physician and scientist
- Antonio Tosti (1776–1866), Catholic cardinal
- Don Tosti (1923–2004), given name: Edmundo Martínez Tostado, American musician and composer
- Éric Tosti (born 1972), French filmmaker
- Liberato Tosti (1883–1950), Italian prelate of the Catholic Church
- Luigi Tosti (1811–1897), Neapolitan-Italian historian
- Luigi Tosti (sculptor) (born 1845), Italian sculptor
- Paolo Tosti (1846–1916), British-Italian composer and music teacher
