= Borroni =

Borroni is an Italian surname from Lombardy. Notable people with the surname include:

- Corrado Borroni (born 1973), Italian tennis player
- Delfino Borroni (1898–2008), Italy's oldest man, and the eleventh-oldest verified man in the world
- Giovanni Angelo Borroni (1684–1772), Italian painter
- Paolo Borroni (1749–1819), Italian painter

== See also ==
- Burruni
