= Perinetti =

Perinetti is a surname of Italian origin. Notable people with this surname include:

- Emilio Perinetti (1852-1936), Italian painter
- Juan Perinetti (1891–1957), Argentine footballer
- Natalio Perinetti (1900–1985), Argentine footballer
- José Cuneo Perinetti (1887-1977), Uruguayan painter
