= Lorenzo Tancini =

Italian painter

Lorenzo Toncini (Caorso, (Province of Piacenza), August 10, 1802 - Piacenza, 1884) was an Italian painter.

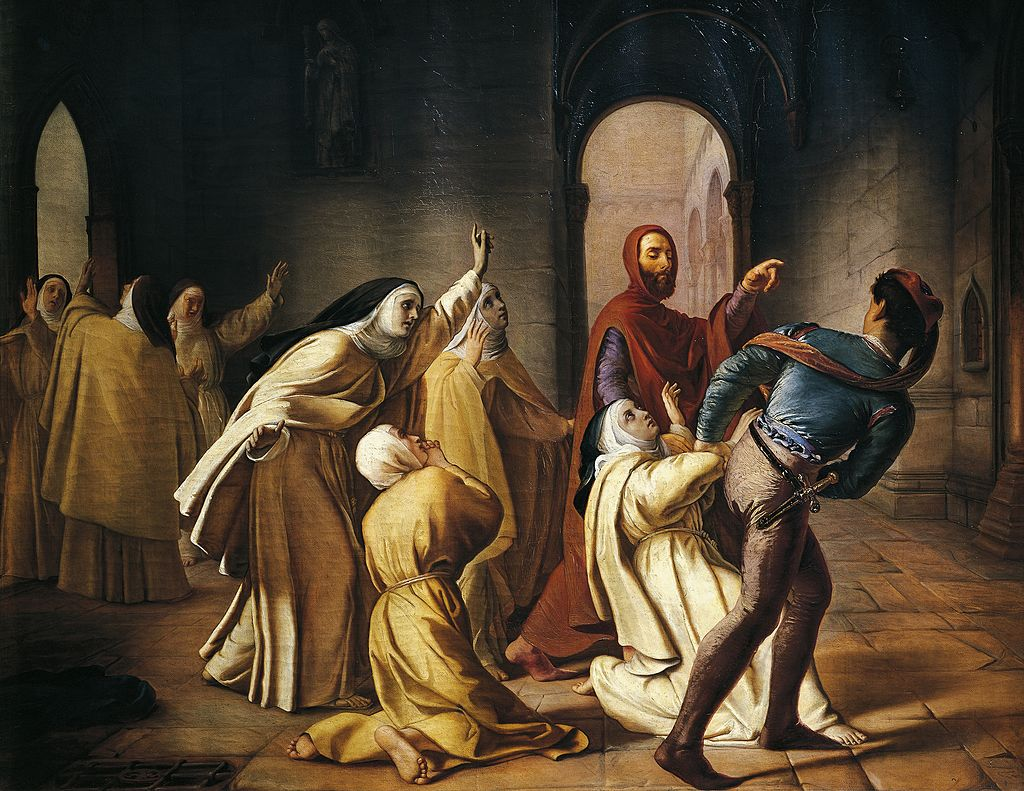
Piccarda Donati fatta rapire dal convento di Santa Chiara dal Fratello, (1884) Musei Civici of Pavia.

== Biography ==
He became first a pupil of Giuseppe Gherardi at the Istituto Gazzola of Fine Arts of Piacenza; as a young man move to Rome. He studied nearly ten years at the Accademia di San Luca under Gaspare Landi.

He then moved to Milan and completed commissions from, among others, Count Prospero Frissino of Lodi, for whom he completed, a Death of the Duke Farnese. He painted a Madonna di Caravaggio and San Carlo Borromeo before those afflicted with the Plague for the church of Borgotrebbia, on commission from Count Carlo Douglas Scotti.

He moved back to Piacenza by 1830, and was appointed consigliere and professor of the Ducal Academy of Fine Arts of Parma. He was also professor of painting at the Istituto Gazzola di Piacenza by 1840. In addition to his teaching duties, he mainly painted portraits: among them, a portrait of Count Antonio Parma, by commission of the Istituto Gazzola. He also was commissioned by the Ospizi civili of Cortemaggiore to paint a Resurrection of Christ found in the chapel of the Suffragio. He also painted: The Wounded Gladiator and a Roman Soldier pursued in Rome. He painted the death of Pier Luigi Farnese by commission of Count Frissino Prospero of Lodi, and this was sent to the World Exposition of London, where it obtained a wooden medal.

Among his pupils were Francesco Ghittoni and Giovanni Bernardino Pollinari, who published his posthumous biography.
