= Santa Maria in Torricella, Piacenza =

Church in Piacenza, Italy

Coordinates: 45°2′58.513″N 9°42′23.058″E

Santa Maria in Torricella is a Roman Catholic church, located in Piacenza, Italy.

The church was built in 1514 to house an icon of the Virgin in a chapel at the site. This church was used to provide religious consolation to those condemned to death (the scaffold was near the square). This service was provided by the Capuchins order, established in the church by Bishop Burali to take the role from the Confraternity of San Giovanni. The first church was enlarged in the mid-seventeenth century. The church has a canvas of a Beato Paolo Burali by Gaspare Landi, a Crucifixon by Robert de Longe, and a St Disma by Giuseppe Gherardi.
