= Giovanni Battista Ercole =

Italian painter and architect

Giovanni Battista Ercole (1750 – 12 June 1811) was an Italian painter and architect, active in Piacenza in a Neoclassical style. He was born in Erba. He died at Piacenza.

He helped decorate in 1789 the villa Rocca at Corneliano. He participated in the ceiling decoration after 1788 of Santa Maria di Campagna in Piazenza.
