= Francesco Maria Bazzani =

Italian Baroque composer

Francesco Maria Bazzani or Bassani (c. 1650 – c. 1700) was an Italian baroque composer.

Francesco was a member of the musical Bassani family, of whom Giovanni Battista Bassani is the best remembered today. He is to be distinguished from another Francesco Maria Bassani two generations earlier (fl. 1621), nephew of the viola da gamba composer Oratio Bassani, who kept a pedagogic notebook Regole di contrapunto, which contains eight pieces, seven of which are probably by his uncle Oratio.

He was maestro di cappella of the Duomo di Piacenza from 1673

Upon the death of his sister and her husband, a musician named Keller from Germany, Francesco adopted his nephew Fortunato Chelleri and trained him as a musician.

== Works ==
Operas

- Ottone il Grande (Parma 1670) is cited as an early example of an opera seria where a minor comic character, in this case the servant Lenno, returns at the end of Acts 1 and 2 of the opera to enable a comic ballet to be performed.
- L'inganno trionfato overo La disperata speranza ravvivata ne' successi di Giacopo Quinto di Scozia e Maddalena di Francia, Parma (1673) libretto: Oratio Francesco Roberti
