= Giannicola di Paolo =

Italian painter

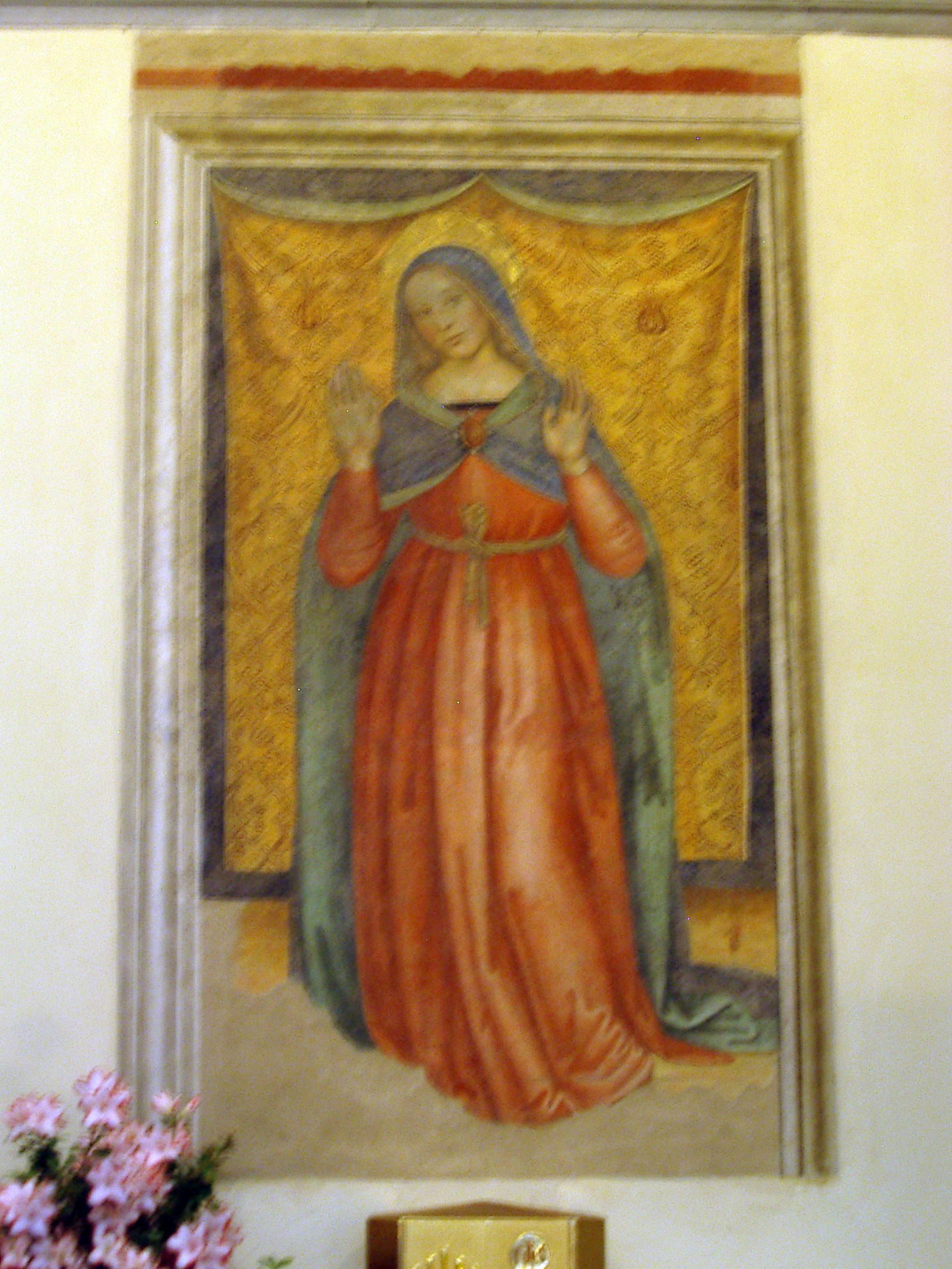
Madonna delle Grazie, fresco, church of Sant'Agostino, Perugia

Giannicola di Paolo (c. 1460–1544), also known as Giannicola di Paolo Manni or Smicca, was an Italian painter of the Renaissance period, active mainly in Perugia. He was born in Città della Pieve. His most prominent work is the Madonna delle Grazie in the Duomo of Perugia. He was a pupil of Pietro Perugino, but was also influenced by Raphael. The Museo Gazzola in Piacenza has one of his works.
