= Paolo Bozzini =

Italian painter

Paolo Bozzini (25 January 1815 – 1892) was an Italian painter.

== Biography ==
He was born in Piacenza. He began his studies under Carlo Maria Viganoni in his native city; the patronage of doctor Lodovico Guglieri, allowed him to travel to Rome to work in the studios of Cammuccini, and Podesti. The later was a close mentor. The priest Luigi Rezzi, also from Piacenza and a professor at the University of the Sapienza in Rome, also helped him design works. He died from progressive paralysis.

Among his works in Piacenza: the altarpiece at the Sacristy of the Cathedral of Piacenza, representing the moment before the martyrdom of Santa Giustina; The arrest of Pandolfo Collenuccio of Pesaro; Filippo Arcelli assists the needs of his brother and son from a window in the Castle of Sant'Antonino in Piacenza; Giulio Alberovi presents the portrait of Elisabeth Farnese to Phillip V, King of Spain; Defense of Piacenza against the siege of Francesco Sforza; Correggio shows his St Jerome in his studio at a Nun; Garibaldi embarks from Marseille; Apotheosis of St Rocco for the church of the same name; Jeremiah predicts the captivity to the Hebrews; Death of Matatia; Apotheosis of San Ludovico. His daughter Candida Luigia Bozzini was also a painter.
