= Fortunato Chelleri =

Italian composer

- Born: May or June 1690; Parma, Duchy of Parma and Piacenza
- Died: 11 December 1757 (age 67); Kassel
- Occupations: Kapellmeister; Composer

Fortunato Chelleri (originally: Keller, also: Kelleri, Kellery, Cheler) (May or June 1690 in Parma – 11 December 1757 in Kassel) was a Baroque Kapellmeister and composer.

== Biography ==
Chelleri's father had emigrated from Germany to Italy; his mother was from the Italian family of musicians Bazzani (or Bassani, see also Giovanni Battista Bassani). After the early death of his parents, he grew up with his uncle Francesco Maria Bazzani in Piacenza, who trained him as a musician. Chelleri started to compose operas for different opera companies in Northern Italy in 1708. He served in noble families in Barcelona, Florence and Venice, among others, including a post as maestro di capella of Anna Maria Luisa de' Medici.

In 1722, Fürstbischof Johann Philipp Franz von Schönborn engaged him as Hofkapellmeister in Würzburg, together with Giovanni Benedetto Platti. After the death of the Fürstbischof in 1724, Chelleri was in Kassel Hofkapellmeister of the Landgraf Karl von Hessen-Kassel. Between 1732 and 1734, he followed Karl's son and successor Frederick of Sweden to the royal court of Stockholm. He returned to Germany with the title and fund of Hofrat (Court Councillor) and directed the private orchestra of Friedrich's brother Wilhelm VIII, von Hessen-Kassel until his death.

== Works ==
During his activity in Italy, he composed mostly operas, such as L'Innocenza giustificata, premiered in Venice in 1711, La caccia in Etolia, premiered in Ferrara in 1715, on a libretto of Belisario Valeriano which was used by George Frideric Handel for Atalanta, and Amalasunta.

During his time in Germany and Sweden, Chelleri composed instrumental and church music, including oratorios in Italian. Compositions for keyboard instruments, such as 6 Fuge per l'Organo e 6 Sonate per il Cembalo (Kassel, ca 1729), and six Sonate di galanteria (Kassel), and six Sinfonie for strings were published. His oratorio in two parts Beatæ Mariæ Virginis (Würzburg, 1723) was reprinted by Garri Editions, Mühlheim, in 2003.

== Recordings ==
- Don Quixote (L’attage du moulin, La Doulcinée, La galop de Rosinante, Sanco Panche, Le couche de Don Quixote), organist Kalevi Kiviniemi on the Las Piñas Bamboo Organ in 2003.
- Six Simphonies Nouvelles Orchestra Atalanta Fugiens, dir. Vanni Moretto. Deutsche Harmonia Mundi 2009

== Literature ==
- Arrey von Dommer: Chellery, Fortunato. In: Allgemeine Deutsche Biographie (ADB). Band 4. Duncker & Humblot, Leipzig 1876, p. 114 (in German).
- A.Della Cortenel e G.M.Gatti: Dizionario di musica, ed. Paravia & C., Torino, 1956, p. 130 (in Italian)
