= Carlo Maria Viganoni =

Italian painter (1786–1839)

Carlo Maria Viganoni (28 January 1786, in Piacenza – 8 November 1839) was an Italian painter, active in the Neoclassic style.

== Biography ==
At the age of 20, Viganoni began studies under Giuseppe Gherardi at the Istituto Gazzola in Piacenza; two years later in 1808, he moved to Rome to work under Gaspare Landi. He painted a Redeemer (1814) for the church of Draghignan in Provence. He became an honorary associate of Academy of St Luke in 1822, and the next year academic of merit.

His connection in Rome to Landi, gained him a commission as one of the artist to help decorate the new church of San Francesco di Paola in Naples. Viganoni painted a canvas depicting Sant'Andrea Avellino. Returning to Piacenza by 1830, he was much in demand for portraits and sacred subjects. He painted a portrait of Cardinal Angelo Mai, Pope Pius VII, and the bishops Scribani and Loschi. He painted a Sacred Heart for the Duomo of Piacenza and a San Luigi Gonzaga for the church of San Paolo in Piacenza. He gained a post as teacher for the Instituto Gazzola.
