= Luigia Bozzini =

Italian painter

Luigia Bozzini or Candida Luigia Bozzini (19th century) was an Italian painter, mainly in Piacenza and mainly depicting religious subjects. Her father Paolo Bozzini was also a painter. Among her works are a Madonna del Sacro Cuore di Gesù, commissioned by the Bishop of Piacenza as a gift for Pope Pius IX, who gave it as a gift to the Bishop of Jesi for the church of Castelplanio. She also painted a pastel portrait of Alessandro Manzoni, that won a silver medal at the provincial exhibition of Piacenza. She painted a Holy Family, and many copies of the Via Crucis of Carlo Maria Viganoni, and the Madonna of Lourdes: In 1881 she became a nun in the Ursuline convent of Piacenza; but continued to paint.
