= Francesco Bendusi =

Italian composer

Francesco Bendusi (died c. 1553) was an Italian composer of the 16th century. He was active in Venice where Antonio Gardano notably published his Opera nova de Balli di Francesco Bendusi a quatro accomodati da cantare & sonare d'ogni sorte de stromenti in 1553. He died in that city soon after.

== Recordings ==
Bendusi's works have been recorded on a number of albums of Renaissance music by performers like the French ensemble Doulce Mémoire, the American ensemble Piffaro, The Renaissance Band, Brisk Recorder Quartet Amsterdam (fro Globe) and the Finish organist Kalevi Kiviniemi.
