= Mattio Rampollini =

Italian composer

Mattio Rampollini (also Matteo) (?June 2, 1497 – c. 1553) was an Italian composer of the Renaissance, active in Florence. Employed by the Medici, he was a colleague of the more famous Francesco Corteccia, and was noted for his madrigals, some composed for the opulent entertainments of the Medici court. He is mainly known as a contributing composer to the Intermedio of 1539.

== Biography ==
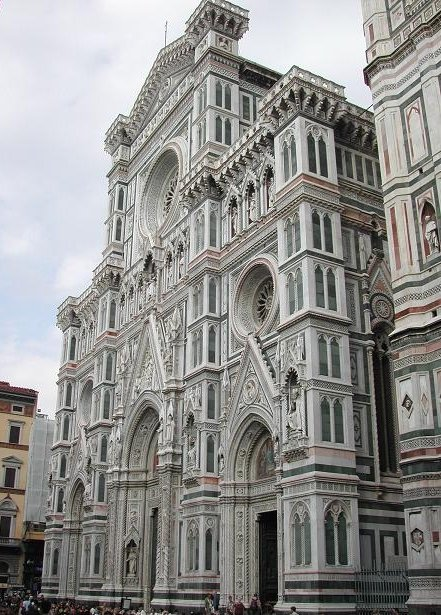
Facade of Florence Cathedral. Rampollini worked here as singing master after 1520.

Little is known about his early life. He was probably born in Florence, and the only records of his career are from that city. When Bernardo Pisano left Florence Cathedral to go to Rome in 1520, Rampollini took over the job of singing teacher to the boys there; around this time he may have been Corteccia's teacher as well.

In 1539 he provided some of the music for the wedding of Duke Cosimo de' Medici and Eleanora di Toledo. The Venetian printer Antonio Gardano printed two madrigals from this wedding in 1539, Ecco la fida and Lieta per honorarte, along with the rest of the music (mostly composed by Corteccia). He evidently was employed by the Medici for his entire life. The largest surviving work of his, the setting of a cycle of seven canzoni by Petrarch, was published in 1554 by Jacques Moderne of Lyon. Much other music is presumed to have been lost, particularly if it never reached the publishing houses in Venice or Lyon. A few of his madrigals found their way to anthologies, one as late as 1562.

== Music ==
Alfred Einstein contrasted his work to that of his Florentine colleague and probable student, Corteccia, calling the latter "unliterary." While little of Rampollini's music has survived, it had some innovative qualities: he set the seven Petrarch canzoni as a cycle, a trend which began around mid-century (the date of the composition of the Petrarch cycle is not known, except that it was before 1554); and he was attentive to textural contrast over large time-spans, as each member of the cycle uses a different grouping of three, four, five, or six voices, but each ends with all of the voices. He was a modest man, as indicated in his preface to the collection, in which he stated that the poetry would have been better set by those more worthy, such as Josquin or Willaert.

Rampollini's setting of the Petrarch canzoni can be found in Corpus Mensurabilis Musicae, vol. xxxii/7, ed. in 1974.
