= Francesco Ghittoni =

Italian painter

Francesco Ghittoni (1855–1928) was an Italian painter, mainly of genre paintings of the life of rural workers, but also portraits, sacred subjects, and, late in life, landscapes. His early paintings were in a Realist style.

== Biography ==
He was born in Rizzolo (Province of Piacenza). He began as a pupil at the Istituto Gazzola of Lorenzo Toncini, and was attached to the Institute for over a decade. After 1873, he worked under Giovanni Bernardino Pollinari. He exhibited in 1881 at the National Exposition in Milan two paintings on genre topics. In 1903, he was named conservationist at the Museo Civico di Piacenza; and in 1911, he became an Academic at the Istituto Gazzola. He died in 1928 in Piacenza. In 1939, his pupil, Giacomo Bertucci, organized a posthumous exhibition in Piacenza.
