= Kalevi Kiviniemi =

Finnish organist (1958–2024)

- Kiviniemi in c. 2010
- Born: 30 June 1958; Jalasjärvi, Finland
- Died: 3 April 2024 (aged 65); Kurikka, Finland
- Education: Sibelius Academy
- Occupations: Concert organist; Festival director
- Organizations: Lahti Organ Week
- Awards: Finnish State Prize for Music
- Website: kalevikiviniemi.com

Kalevi Ilmari Kiviniemi (30 June 1958 – 3 April 2024) was a Finnish concert organist. He gave more than 2,000 concerts, and his discography includes nearly 200 titles, many of them featuring significant and unique organs in the US, Japan, the Philippines, Australia, Italy, France, Switzerland and Germany. Kiviniemi was also regarded as a distinguished improviser. He was the first to record the complete organ works by Jean Sibelius.

== Life and career ==
Born in Jalasjärvi on 30 June 1958, Kiviniemi began playing the organ at age 17. He studied at the Kuopio Conservatory and at the Sibelius Academy, achieving a concert diploma in 1983 under Eero Väätäinen and Olli Linjama (improvisation). He was organist at the Ristinkirkko in Lahti from 1985 to 2000. In the late 1980s and early 1990s, he started an international career with recitals in Prague, Japan and London. He toured in Europe, the US, Russia, Australia, Japan and the Philippines.

Kiviniemi frequently performed at Notre-Dame in Paris. His 2000 performance there together with Olivier Latry, titulaire du grand orgue of Notre-Dame, was televised. His first solo performance at Notre-Dame was in 2002. He played with orchestras such as the Moscow Chamber Orchestra and the Moscow Symphony Orchestra.

Kiviniemi played in concert halls such as Gewandhaus in Leipzig, Tchaikovsky Hall in Moscow, and the Sejong Center in Seoul, and at churches such as Saint-Sulpice and Sainte-Clotilde in Paris, Berliner Dom, Passau Cathedral and St. John the Divine Cathedral in New York City. In 2009, he played a concert of transcriptions at the Konzerthaus Dortmund. In 2010, he played concerts at the Internationales Düsseldorfer Orgelfestival, at St. Martin, Idstein, and at the Wuppertaler Orgeltage.

Kiviniemi was artistic director of the Lahti Organ Week in Finland from 1991 to 2001. He was a jury member at international organ competitions, Nuremberg in 1996, Capri in 1998, Speyer in 2001, Korschenbroich in 2005, St. Albans International Organ Festival, UK. in 2013, and Strasbourg in 2016. He gave master classes and lectures, for instance at the Ruhr University Bochum and the Sibelius Academy.

Kiviniemi later returned to Jalasjärvi to take care of his mother. He died there on 3 April 2024, at the age of 65, after a heart attack the previous week.

== Recordings ==
Kiviniemi's discography numbers more than 200 titles as of 2020, including recordings made on historic organs in the US, Japan, the Philippines, Australia, Italy, France, Switzerland and Germany, such as the Cavaillé-Coll organ of the Church of St. Ouen, Rouen and Orléans Cathedral. Kiviniemi was the first to record the complete organ works of Jean Sibelius, reviewed in 2010:

"Judicious" is an apt description of Kiviniemi's playing style, as well as his choice of organ and repertoire. Whether it's the mighty Cavaillé-Coll of Saint-Ouen, the Grand Paschen organ of Pori's Central Church or the noble Kangasala at Lakeuden Risti, one senses his choices are carefully made, the music matched to the instrument and its unique acoustic. This Sibelius recital is no exception, the late-19th-century Walcker – three manuals, with 16' and 32' pipes – seems ideally suited to the thrust and scale of the works at hand.

=== Organ Era recordings ===
With the Finnish publisher Fuga, Kiviniemi began in 2001 a series of recordings of music from different eras, played on an instrument to match, Organ Era.

- Vol. 1 Renaissance-Tänze, works by Francesco Bendusi, Antonio Valente, Tielman Susato, Adriano Banchieri, Hans Neusidler, and Claude Gervaise, among others, on the Renaissance organ of the Schlosskirche in Schmalkalden, 2001
- Vol. 2 Bamboo Organ, works by Michel Corrette, Jean-Baptiste Lully, Jean-Philippe Rameau, Antonio de Cabezón, Juan Bautista José Cabanilles, Luis de Milán, Luys de Narváez, Fortunato Chelleri, Johann Caspar Kerll, Gaetano Piazza, Gioachino Rossini, John Blow, and John Stanley, among others, on the bamboo organ of Las Piñas in Manila, 2003
- Vol. 3 Heroic Song, on the organ of Lapua Cathedral, 2003
- Vol. 4 Angel Dream, transcriptions for organ, on the organ of Lapua Cathedral, 2003
- Vol. 5 Waltzing Matilda, on the Grand Concert Organ of the Melbourne Town Hall
- Vol. 6 Serassi, Italian organ music, works by Niccolo Moretti, Antonio Diana, Baldassare Galuppi, Vincenzo Palafuti, Michelangelo Rossi, Domenico Zipoli and Padre Davide da Bergamo, on the Serassi Organ of San Biagio in Caprino Bergamasco, 2004
- Vol. 7 Sibelius, Jean Sibelius Complete Organ Works, on the Walcker of the Stadtkirche Winterthur, 2004
- Vol. 8 Canonnade, on the Holzhey Organ of the Neresheim Abbey, 2004
- Vol. 9 Bombarde, on the organ of the Matthäuskirche in Stuttgart, 2004
- Vol. 10 Liszt, on the historic organ at the Marienbasilika pilgrimage site in Kevelaer, 2006.
- Vol. 12 Jehan Alain, works by Jehan Alain, on the organ of Ristinkirkko in Lahti, 2006
- Vol. 13 Franck, organ works by César Franck, at the Central Pori Church, 2009
- Vol. 14 Cavaillé-Coll, works by Marcel Dupré, Henri Nibelle, César Franck, Alexandre Guilmant, Charles-Marie Widor, and improvisation of Kiviniemi, recorded at the Church of St. Ouen, Rouen, 2008 and 2009
- Vol. 15 Rédemption, on the historic Stahlhuth Organ of St. Martin in Dudelange, Luxembourg, 2011.
- Vol. 16 The Cliburn Organ, on the Rildia Bee O'Bryan Cliburn Organ, by Casavant Frères limitée, at the Broadway Baptist Church, Fort Worth, Texas, 2015.
- Vol. 17 Finlandia, on the historic Kangasala Organ of Tampere Cathedral, 2016.
- Vol. 18 Antico, on the oldest playable organ in the world, Basilique Notre Dame de Valère in Sion, 2020.
- Vol. 19 Stockwerk, on the Harder-Völkmann-Orgel in Stockwerk, Gröbenzell, 2016.

=== Other recordings ===
- Visions, improvisation and Finnish organ music (1994–1998), Finlandia
- Chicago Concert, works by Gabriel Pierné, Joseph Bonnet, Marcel Dupré, Charles-Marie Widor, Camille Saint-Saëns, Aulis Sallinen, Joonas Kokkonen, Aimo Känkänen, Jean Sibelius and improvisation of Kiviniemi, 1999
- Lakeuden Ristin urut (Organ of the Lakeuden Risti church), works by Franz Liszt (arr. Kiviniemi), César Franck, Alexandre Guilmant, Marcel Dupré, Pierre Cochereau, his own, Oskar Merikanto, recorded in Seinäjoki in Lakeuden Risti (designed by Alvar Aalto), on an instrument built by the Kangasala organ factory, 2009
- Organ Gravitation, 2018

=== Awards for recordings ===
Some of his recordings earned awards; Improvisation was named Star Recording by The Organ in 1999, and Visions, containing Finnish organ music, received the Janne Prize for the best Finnish solo recording.

== Compositions ==
Music that Kiviniemi improvised and composed includes:

- Suite francaise (1991)
  - Caprice héroique, hommage à Aristide Cavaillé-Coll
  - Souvenir, hommage à Madame Dupré
  - Carillon, hommage à Marcel Dupré
- Visions for dancers and organ (1998)
- Dies irae
- Poeme symphonique`(1999)
- Suite on Waltzing Matilda (2004)
- Variations sur un Noël (2004)
- Fantasia Suomalainen rukous (2008)

== Awards ==
Kiviniemi received the Luonnotar Prize at the Sibelius Festival in Lahti in 2003, and his services to Finnish organ music earned him the trophy of the Organum Society in 2004. In 2009 he was awarded the Finnish State Prize for Music for lifelong achievements in music, and he received a State Pension in 2020.
