= San Giovanni in Canale, Piacenza =

Church in Piacenza, Italy

Coordinates: 45.05178°N 9.68787°E

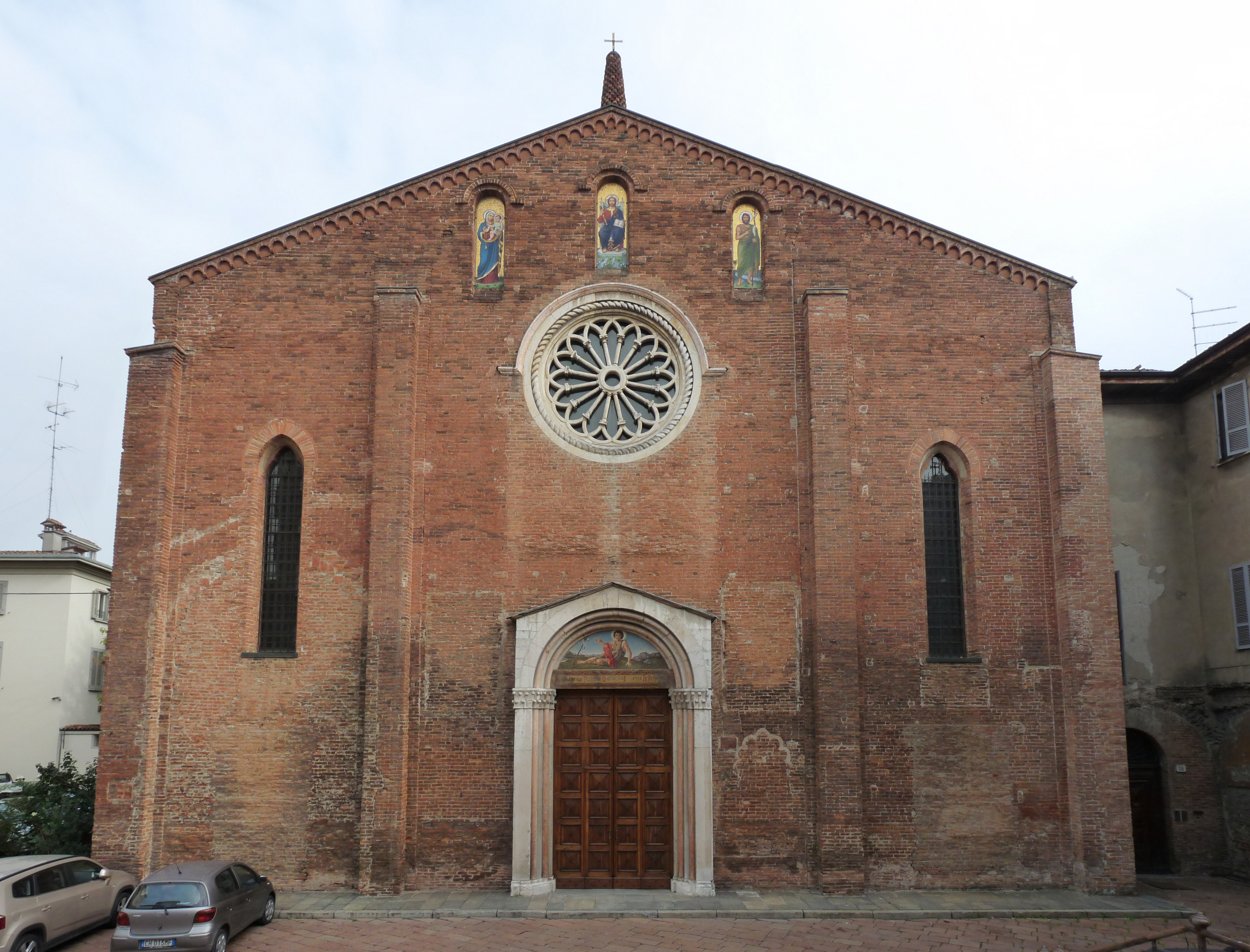
Facade of church

San Giovanni in Canale is a Gothic-style Roman Catholic church located on Via Croce #26 in central Piacenza, formerly associated with a Dominican monastery.

== History ==
The Dominican order, newly founded in 2016, arrived in Piacenza in 1220 and patronage soon found them a suitable site next to the Rio Beverora (an Ancient Roman canal that flowed into the Po River, that allowed them to establish a monastery and a church. They dedicated the church to St John the Baptist. This church was called “in canale” to distinguish it from a similarly dedicated temple in town. With the enlargement of the San Giovanni in Canale, a nearby small church belonging to the Templars (Santa Maria del Tempio) was converted into an oratory attached to San Giovanni.

This Dominican complex once housed the Inquisition tribunal. The structure, including the facade were rebuilt in 1522 in a Gothic style, with a large rose window. The church was suppressed by the French in 1797.

The interior has 14th century tombs of the Scotti family. In the 16th and 17th centuries, the interior was decorated in Rococo style with stucco and gilding. The Chapel of the Rosary, designed by the early 19th century by Antonio Tomba, was decorated in the neoclassical style with large canvases by Gaspare Landi (Road to Calvary) and Vincenzo Camuccini (Presentation at the Temple). An inventory in 1842, notes the Chapel of St Catherine has the funereal monument of Orazio Scotti, marchese di Montalbo, who was an early patron of the painter Giovanni Lanfranco. The bust of Scotti was sculpted by Alessandro Algardi. Small canvases were painted by Roberto da Longe and the studio of il Malosso. The next chapel is dedicated to San Vincenzo Ferrari, named co-patron of Piacenza in 1736; the altarpiece depicts a miracle by this saint of performing a resurrection, painted by Giuseppe Marchesi. The next altarpiece depicts St Peter Martyr painted by Paolo Borroni. This painter also completed the altarpiece of St Dominic. The choir and apse has frescoes painted by Francesco Natali (son of Giovanbattista and Sebastiano Galeotti. In the choir is a small canvas painted by Gervaso Gatti (il Soiaro), nephew of Bernardino Gatti, depicting the Circumcision of Jesus. The lunette of the chapel found underneath the bell-tower was decorated by Benedetto Marini, who depicted the Adoration of the Magi.
