= Giuseppe Gherardi =

Italian painter

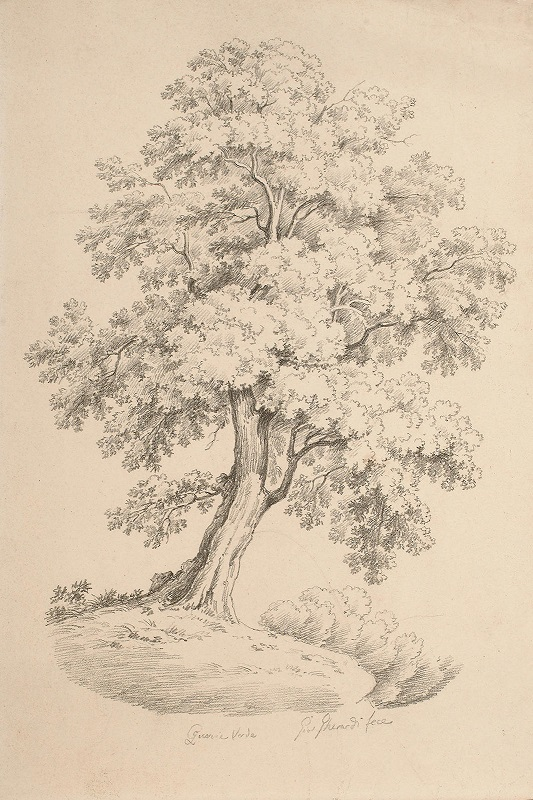
"Quercia verde", pencil on paper, 42.5 x 28.5 cm.

Giuseppe Gherardi (Piacenza, 1756 - Piacenza, 7 November 1828) was an Italian painter, active in the Neoclassic style.

== Biography ==
He painted a San Disma for the church of the Santa Maria in Torricella in Piacenza, a canvas that stood alongside an altarpiece by Roberto Da Longe. He painted a Moses and a David for the church of Santa Maria in Campagna. The altarpieces stood facing St Roch and St Sebastian, painted by Andrea Procaccini. He also painted a Transfiguration that onces stood in the church of San Salvatore in Piacenza. Gherardi became professor of painting at the Istituto Gazzola in Piacenza. One of his pupils was Carlo Maria Viganoni.
