= Francisco Calvo Serraller =

Spanish art historian (1948–2018)

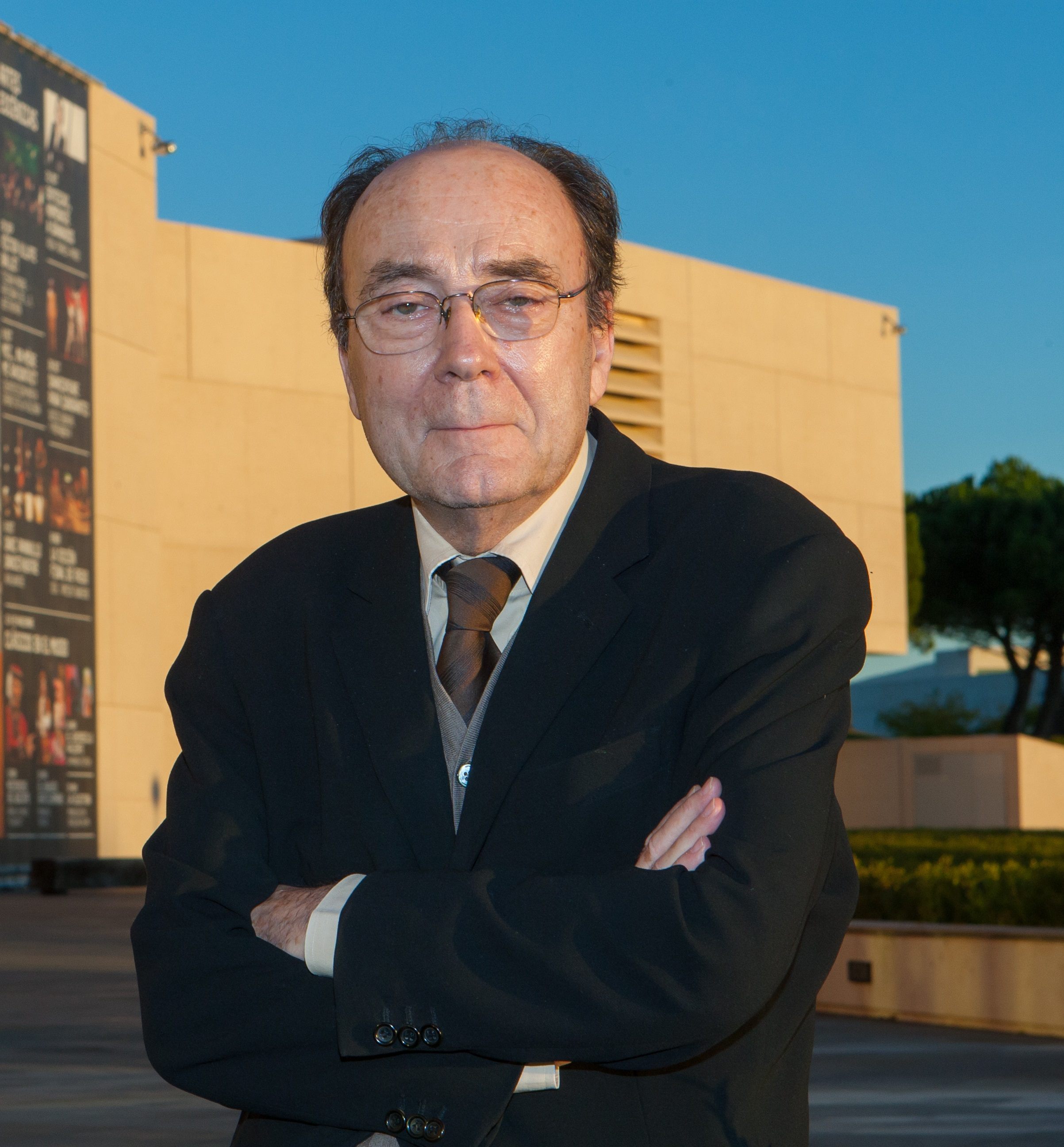
Francisco Serraller

Francisco Calvo Serraller (19 April 1948 – 16 November 2018) was a Spanish art historian.

== Life ==
He was born in 1948 in Madrid.

== Career ==
Calvo Serraller completed his Doctorate in Philosophy and Literature specializing in History at the Complutense University. He was a member of the Royal Academy of Fine Arts of San Fernando from 2001 until his death. He was Director of the Prado Museum. He was a regular contributor to the newspaper El País, since its founding in 1976.

== Bibliography ==
Some of his books are:

- Spain, Half a Century of Avant-Garde Art (1985).
- The Art seen by Artists (1987).
- Vanguard and Tradition in Contemporary Spanish Art (1989).
- The Novel of the Artist (1991).
- Encyclopedia of 20th Century Spanish Art (1992).
- Grandes Maestros de la Pintura|The Greatest Masters of Art and its Paintings (1993) (Illustrated by Willi Glasauer).
- Brief History of the Prado Museum (1994).
- The Romantic Image of Spain: Art and Architecture of the 19th Century (1995).
- El Greco (1995).
- Las Meninas de Velázquez (1996).
- Columnary: Reflections by an Art Critic (1998).
- Freedom of Exhibition: A Different Art History (2000).
- Contemporary Art (2001).
- The Genres of Painting (2005).
