= Umberto Concerti =

Italian painter

Umberto Concerti (1891–1979) was an Italian painter, painting both vedute and portraits.

== Biography ==
Concerti was born in Stienta (Province of Rovigo). He began as a pupil of Paolo Baratta at the Institute of Art of Parma. In 1923, he won an award from the comune of Parma. He worked with Galileo Chini in frescoes for the Terme Berzieri at Salsomaggiore. In 1936, he painted frescoes in a chapel of the Cemetery of Parma; in 1937, for the parish church of Toccalmatto di Fontanellato; in 1942, for the parish church of Mariano di Valmozzola; in 1943, for the parish church of Gropparello.

He became an instructor at the Institute of Fine Arts of Parma, but in 1930 obtained a post as professor of figure painting at the Istituto Gazzola of Piacenza, where he taught until 1967. Among his students were Gustavo Foppiani, Armodio, Ludovico Mosconi, Getty Bisagni, William Xerra, Carlo Berté, Bruno Grassi, Paolo Perotti, Luciana Donà, Ercole Piga, Carlo Scrocchi, Giancarlo Braghieri, and Luciana Donà.
