= San Raimondo, Piacenza =

Church attached to a monastery in Emilia Romagna, Italy

Coordinates: 45.04914°N 9.68945°E

Santa Raimondo is a Baroque style, Roman Catholic church, attached to a functioning Benedictine order cloistered monastery occupied by San Raimondo nuns. It is located at Corso Vittorio Emanuele #154 in the southern edge of historic Piacenza, Region of Emilia Romagna, Italy.

== History ==
In 1170, Alberto Moroni had established a church with Lateran Canons dedicated to the Holy Apostles. Two years later a hospital was attached to the church by Raimondo Palmerio (beatified 1422). In 1414 Cardinal Angelo d'Anna granted the church to Cistercian nuns, previously housed in the monastery of Santa Maria di Nazaret. They would remain in possession of the monastery until 1810, when Napoleonic forces suppressed the convent. It was again restored in 1827 to the Benedictine order under the patronage of Donna Maria Teresa de' Conti Maruffi, who had become a nun at the monastery of Santa Maria della Neve. In the 19th century, the monastery was linked to a public school for girls.

The present church was rebuilt by the Cistercians in 1729 with stucco decoration by Camillo Rusca. An inventory from 1842, noted that the first chapel on the right, dedicated to St Joseph had been decorated by Giovanni Battista Tagliasacchi. The main altarpiece had depicted the Charity of San Raimondo painted by Antonio Balestra.

After 1967, the nuns decided to create a cloistered monastery, although it also houses a small hostel, and meeting rooms.
