= Paolo Borroni =

Italian painter (1749–1819)

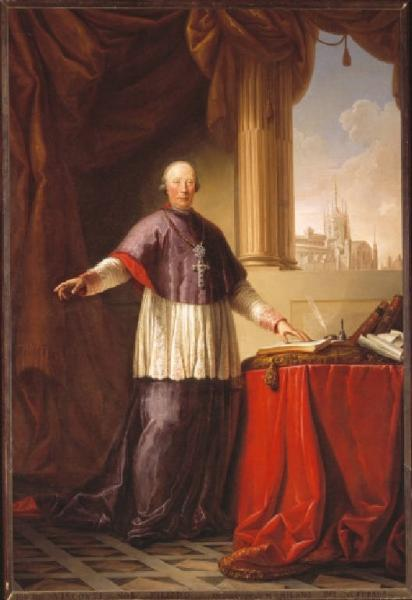
Filippo Maria Visconti, Archbishop of Milan 1784-1801 by Paolo Borroni, Ospedale Maggiore, 1790s

Paolo Borroni (1749–1819) was an Italian painter of the Neoclassical style.

== Biography ==
Borroni was born and first studied in Voghera, then in 1761 moved to Milan and studied under Calderini (or Calderino). He relocated to Parma and studied under Benigno Rossi. He won a number of prizes from the Academy of Fine Arts of Parma in 1770 and 1771. In 1772, he moved to Rome and worked in the studio of Pompeo Batoni, and after a trip to Venice, returned to Vorghera in 1776.

By the next year, he had painted a Marriage of the Virgin and Flight from Egypt for the church of San Giuseppe. He painted a Death of St Joseph (1778) for the church of the Convitto. From 1780 to 1787, he lived in Milan, keeping a studio at the Collegio Elvetico. He gained a pension from King Vittorio Amedeo in reward for a 1787 portrait. He painted an Assumption for the cathedral of Vercelli. In 1809, he painted a Morte del Giustio for the church of Rivanazzano Terme. He painted a St Peter Martyr altarpiece for the church of San Giovanni in Canale, Piacenza.
