= Gazzola Institute, Piacenza =

Arts school in Piacenza, Italy

Coordinates: 45°03′19″N 9°41′18″E

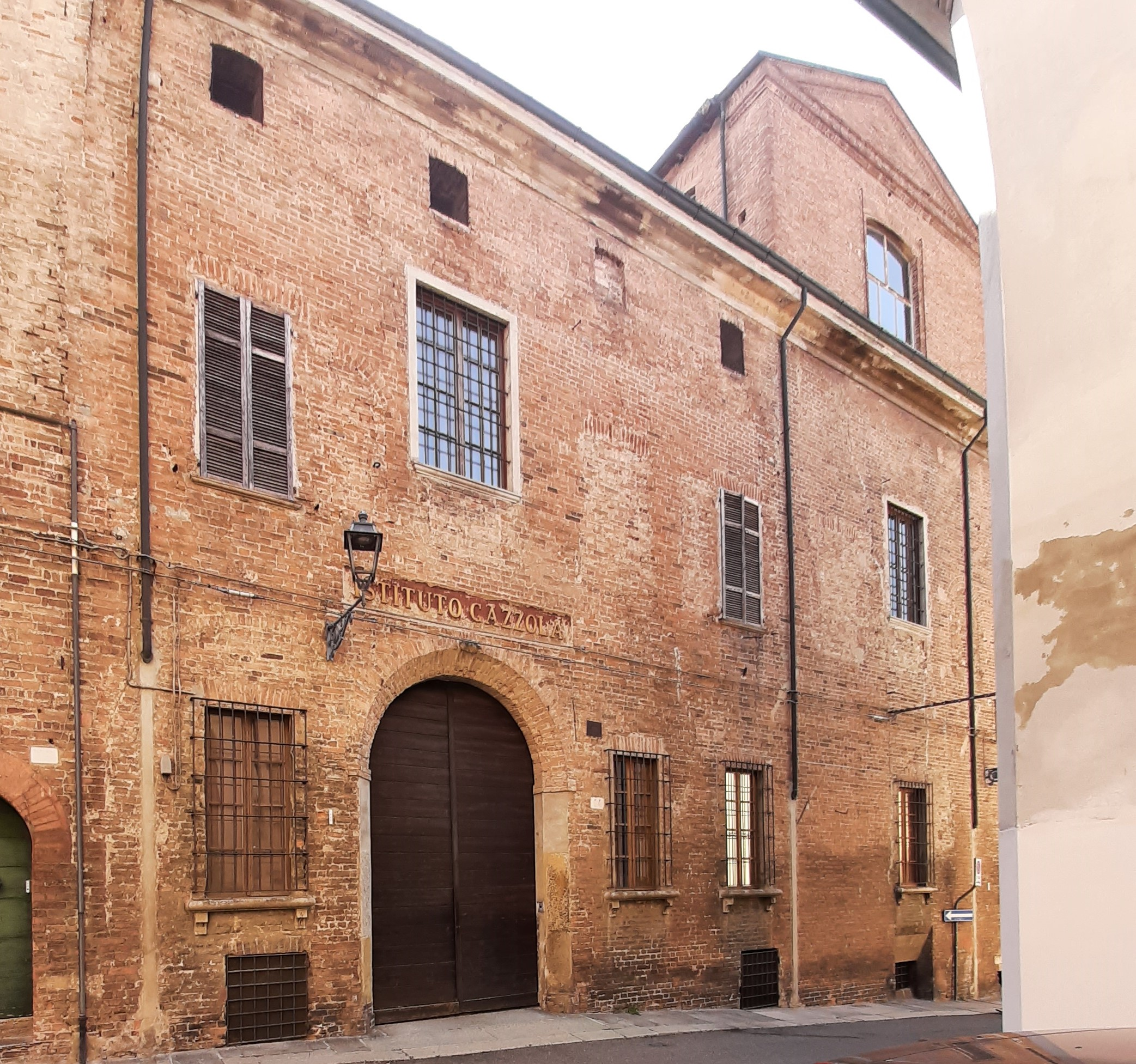
Facade of the institute

The Gazzola Institute is a school of the arts and art museum, located on via Gazzola n°9 in the town of Piacenza, region of Emilia Romagna, Italy.

== History ==
When Count Felice Gazola or Gazzola, Lieutenant General of the Spanish Army, Commander and Coronel of artillery, and Commendatore of the Order of Calatrava died in 1780, his will left money to native Piacenza to: maintain and dress six youths working in decorative or figure painting, wood or marble sculpture, architecture, surveying, art of jewel making... and if Piacenza lacked persons able to teach painting, sculpture, and architecture, the youths would be sent to either Parma or Bologna. He named as administrators of this institute the heads of eight prominent local families: another Conti Gazola, Grassi da Fareneto, Conti Leoni, Caraccioli, Rocca, Cassola, Portapudia, and the Counselor Antonio Francesco Maggi.

These individuals decided to form a more stable institute in 1781, housed in Felice Gazzola's palace and consisting of a school of figure painting and a school of architecture, ornamentation, and perspective (quadratura). A school of Del nudo was later added, expanded in 1834 with schools of practical arithmetics and Geometry descriptive and linear design. They allowed for students to study in Rome.

One of the first professors was Carlo Maria Viganoni, then Giuseppe Gherardi, then Lorenzo Toncini. Viganoni donated his collection of stucco models of classic statuary. Among its early pupils were Innocente Micliavacca (engraver), Gaetano Monti (painter); Davide Testi (engraver); Valerio Rivetti (sculptor), Lorenzo Toncini, Quaglia a manuscript illuminator, and Aspetti, a painter.

The Institute is still localized in the medieval Palace once belonging to the Fontana family, then later to the monastery of San Sisto, until the Count Giovanni Angelo Gazzola obtained it in 1699. The palace held the Museo Civico of Piacenza from 1903 to 1975, when the museum was moved to the Palazzo Farnese of Piacenza.

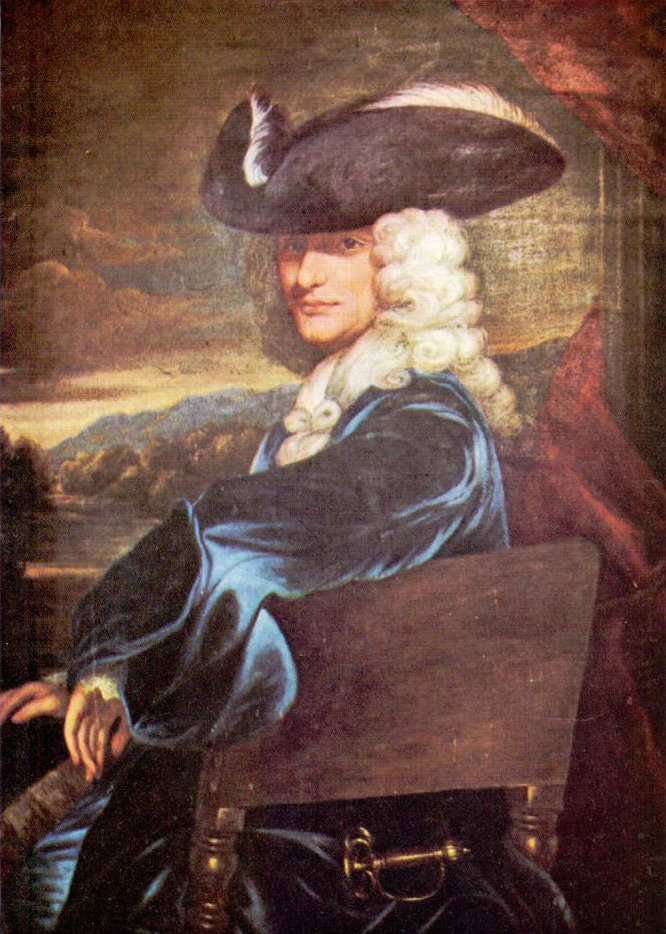
Count Felice Gazzola (1737), by Il Mulinaretto

In 1838 the Institute was endowed with 42 works owned by the Doctor Cesare Martelli, that formed the core of its collections. The collection of armory is now in the Palazzo Farnese. Many works of art are still displayed at the Institute Pinacoteca including:

- Circumcision attributed to Gian Nicola Manni
- Nativity by Bonifacio de' Pitati
- St George and the Dragon by a school of Albrecht Altdorfer
- Visitation of Mary and Elizabeth by Antonio Campi
- Garden Feast attributed to Hieronymus Janssens (il Ballerino)
- St John the Evangelist and Madonna (1684) by Domenico Piola
- Flagellation of Christ by Pier Francesco Mazzucchelli (il Morazone)
- Martyrdom of San Donnino by Gian Mauro della Rovere (il Fiammingo)
- Portrait of Titian by Pietro Muttoni
- Jesus and the Centurion by Mattia Preti
- Il Gregge sull'Appenino by Stefano Bruzzi
- Flaying of Marsyas by Ignazio Stern
- Old woman by Michael Sweerts
- Adam and Eve by Carlo Maria Viganoni
- Hector reproves Paris, Hector and Andromache and Lucretia by Gaspare Landi
- Supper at Emmaus by Luigi Musi
- Game (still life) (1708) by Giuseppe Maria Crespi
- Holy Family (1639) by Luigi Miradori
- Flower (still life) by Margherita Caffi
- Adoration of the Shepherds (before 1680) by Bartolomeo Guidobono
- Portrait of his Mother by Francesco Ghittoni
- Interior Hall of the Academy of Piacenza with models and students (1830-1839) Carlo Maria Viganoni
- Yatagan sword 1850 by Froment Meurice
