= Piacenza Cathedral =

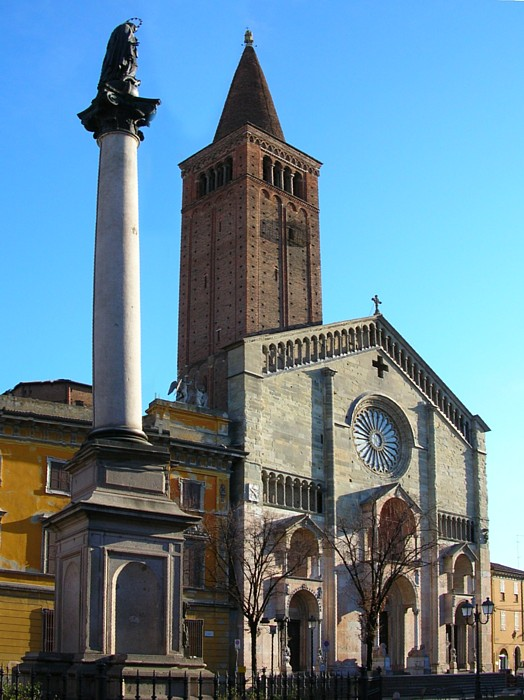
- Piacenza Cathedral
- 45°03′01″N 9°41′50″E
- Location: Emilia-Romagna, Piacenza
- Country: Italy

History
- Founded: between 1122 - 1233
- Dedication: Assumption of the Virgin Mary and to Saint Justina

Specifications
- Height: 85 metres (279 ft)

Piacenza Cathedral (Italian: Duomo di Piacenza), fully the Cathedral of Santa Maria Assunta e Santa Giustina, is a Roman Catholic cathedral in Piacenza, Italy. The current structure was built between 1122 and 1233 and is one of the most valuable examples of a Romanesque cathedral in northern Italy. The dedication is to the Assumption of the Virgin Mary and to Saint Justina. It is the seat of the diocese of Piacenza-Bobbio.

== Architecture ==
The cathedral has a total external length of 85 m, and a façade height of 32 m, dimensions which make it the largest Romanesque church in Emilia-Romagna. The façade, in Veronese pink marble and gilded stone, is horizontally divided by a gallery that dominates the three portals, decorated with capitals and Romanesque statues. The interior has a nave and two aisles, divided by twenty-five massive pillars. Its noteworthy frescoes were made in the 14th-16th centuries by Camillo Procaccini and Ludovico Carracci, while the frescos inside the dome are by Pier Francesco Mazzucchelli, "il Morazzone", and Guercino. The presbytery has a wooden sculpture from 1479, wooden choirstalls by Giangiacomo da Genova (1471) and 15th-century statues of the Lombard school.

The crypt, on the Greek cross plan, has 108 Romanesque small columns and is home to the relics of Santa Justina, who was co-patron of Piacenza from the ninth century; to her was dedicated the first cathedral, Domus Justinae, which collapsed in 1117 after an earthquake.

== History ==
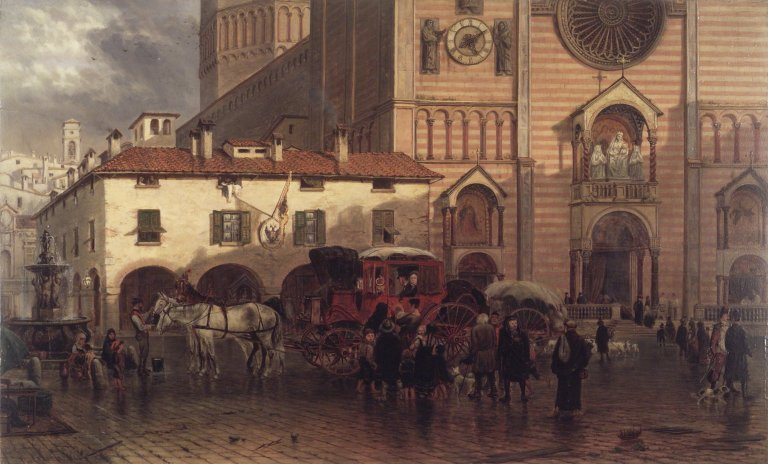
Edward Lamson Henry (American, 1841 - 1919). The Cathedral of Piacenza, 1868. Oil on panel. Brooklyn Museum

Few remains can be traced of the earlier paleochristian basilica, as Piacenza was razed by Totila in 546, during the Gothic War.

A document of 1123 describes Bishop Sigifredo of Piacenza (997–1031) as its "founder".

During its history the cathedral was host to several minor composers as maestro di cappella including Francesco Maria Bazzani, and Giuseppe Nicolini.

== See also ==
- High medieval domes

== Bibliography ==
- Scirea, Fabio (2019). "L'epilogo del progetto di Sigifredo vescovo: il decoro dipinto in S. Antonino a Piacenza" (PDF). Hortus Artium Medievalium. 25 (2): 452–468.
