= Gaspare Landi =

Italian painter (1756–1830)

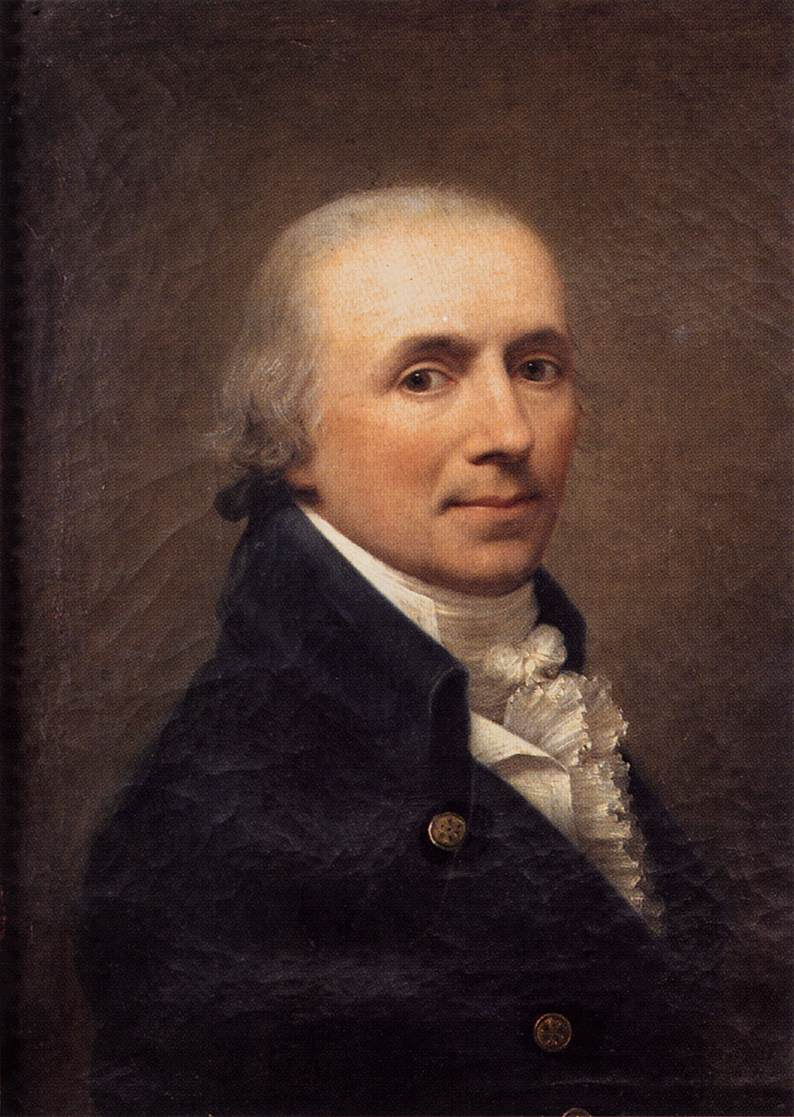
- Self-portrait (1806)

President of the Accademia di San Luca
- In office 1817 – 1820
- Preceded by: Antonio Canova
- Succeeded by: Alessandro Massimiliano Laboureur

Personal details
- Born: 6 January 1756 Piacenza, Duchy of Parma
- Died: 28 February 1830 (aged 74) Piacenza, Duchy of Parma
- Known for: Painting
- Awards: Order of the Iron Crown

Gaspare Landi (6 January 1756 – 28 February 1830) was an Italian painter of the Neoclassic period, active in Rome and his native city of Piacenza.

== Biography ==
Landi is said to have been a fun-loving youth, but in 1781 he procured a subsidy to study painting in Rome from patron and distant relative, Marquis Giambattista Landi. At age 25, he moved to Rome to work under Domenico Corvi and Pompeo Battoni. He is considered a rival of Vincenzo Camuccini.

Two of his pictures were once in the Pinacoteca at Parma, Diomedes and Ulysses bearing off the Palladium (1783) and the Marriage of Abraham and Sarah. Above one of the altars in the church of the Santa Casa at Loreto there is a later work by this Landi showing the Madonna addolorata. A major work is his large canvas representing the fainting of Christ as he struggles along over the road to Calvary weighted down by the burden of the Cross, Lo Spasimo for San Giovanni in Canale at Piacenza. It hung opposite Vincenzo Camuccini's Presentation. He painted a Deposition of the Virgin in the Tomb and Apostles at the empty Tomb of the Virgin (1804) for the choir of the Duomo of Piacenza

Landi became a member of the Accademia di San Luca of Rome in 1805, professor of the theory of painting in 1812, and president of the Academy in 1817. He was also made a Chevalier of the Order of the Iron Crown by the Emperor, of the Order of Saint Joseph, and of a Neapolitan order by the King of Naples. About 1820 he returned to Piacenza, intending to remain there, but soon tired of the monotonous existence of a provincial town and in 1824 reestablished himself at Rome. His last work was an Assumption and was placed in the church of San Francesco di Paola in Naples. He was offered a post as professor of the Academy of Venice, but stayed instead a president of the Academia di San Luca.

He returned to Piacenza in 1829, where he died.

== Selected paintings ==
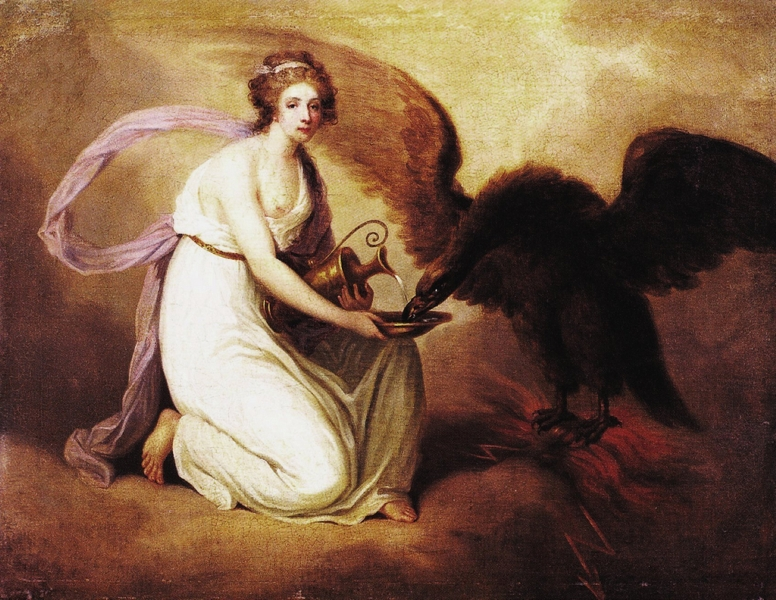
Hebe Nursing Jupiter,
in the Form of an Eagle

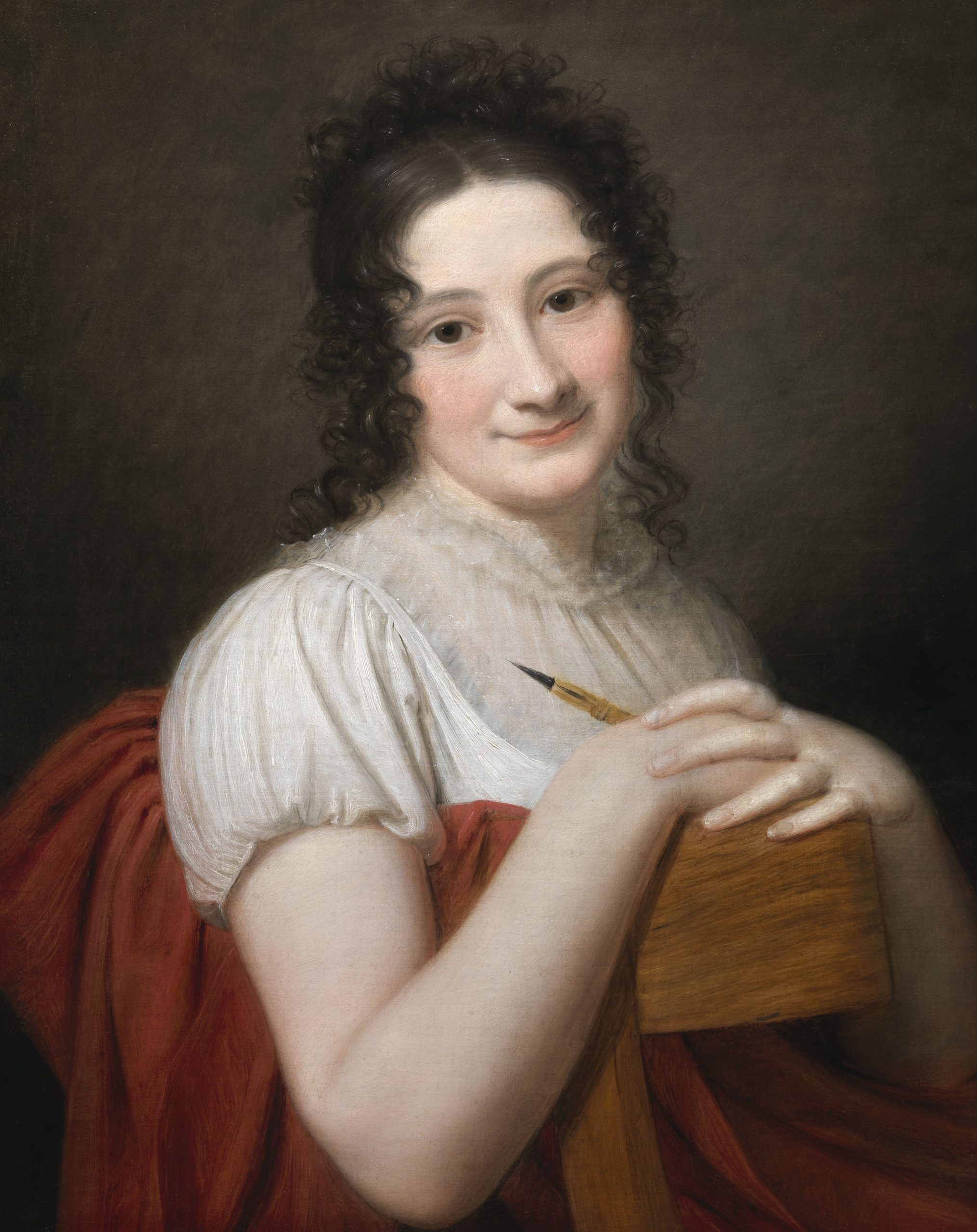
Bianca Milesi

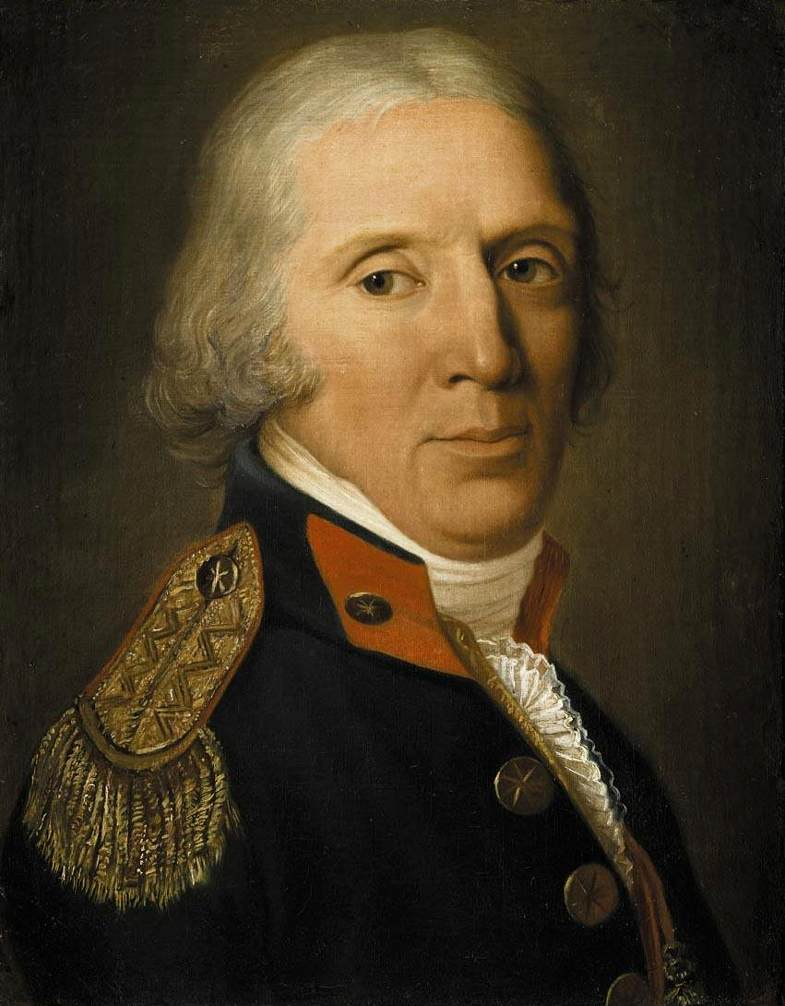
The architect,
Onofrio Boni

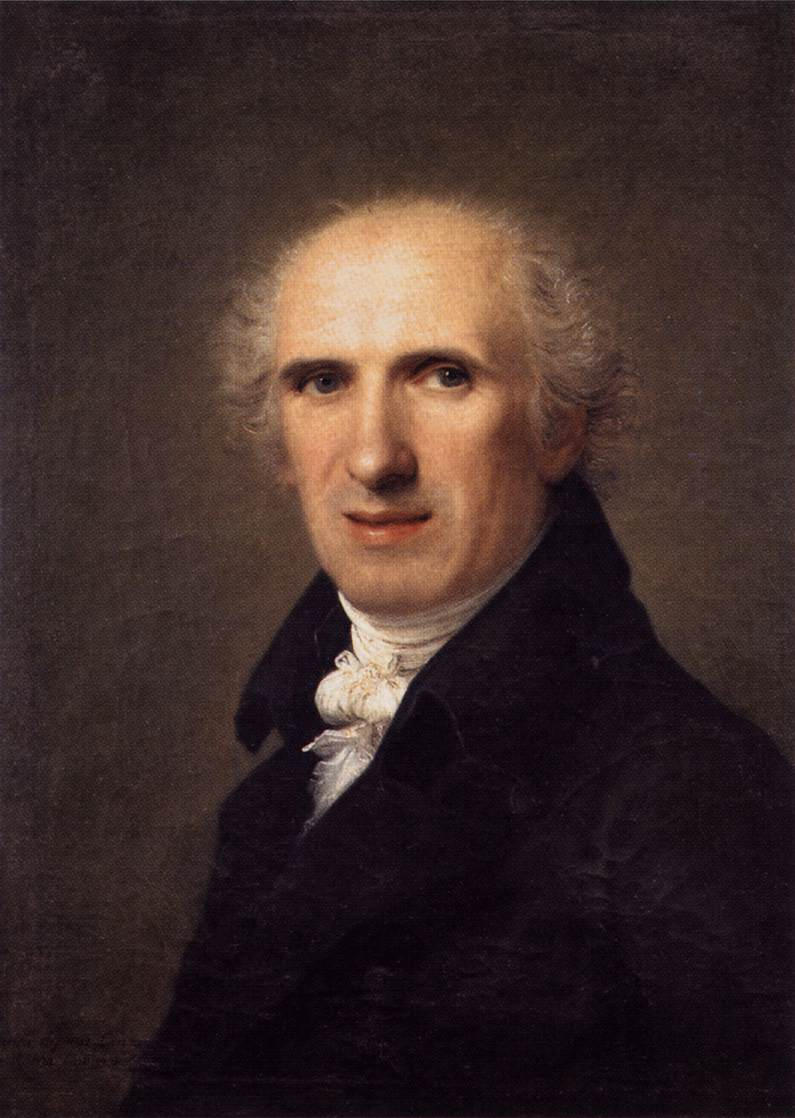
Antonio Canova

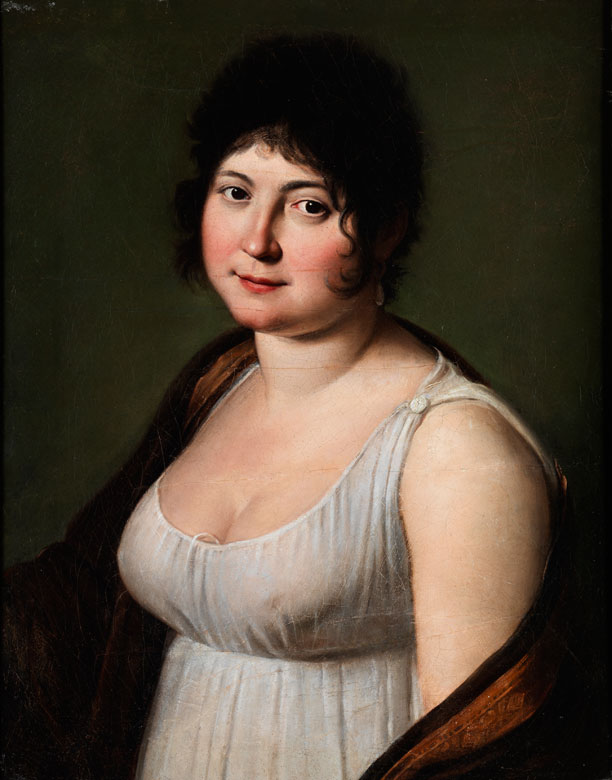
Lady in an
Empire Style Dress

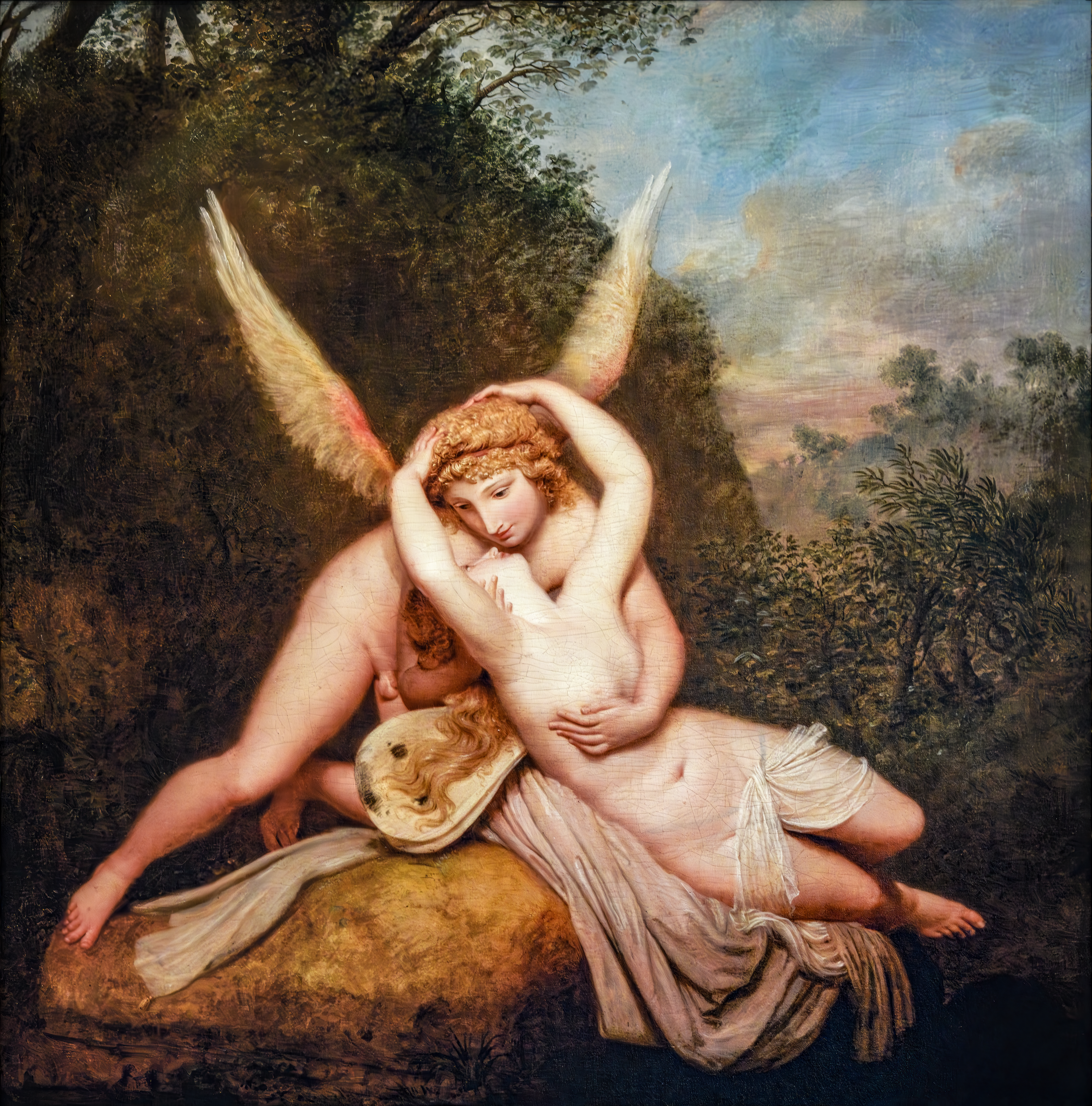
Cupid and Psyche
