= List of municipalities of the Province of Piacenza =

The following is a list of the 46 municipalities (comuni) of the Province of Piacenza in the region of Emilia-Romagna in Italy.

== List ==
Municipality	Population (2026)	Area (km²)	Density
Agazzano	2,054	36.15	56.8
Alseno	4,785	55.27	86.6
Alta Val Tidone	2,927	100.86	29.0
Besenzone	936	23.95	39.1
Bettola	2,627	122.37	21.5
Bobbio	3,344	106.53	31.4
Borgonovo Val Tidone	8,305	51.22	162.1
Cadeo	6,116	38.48	158.9
Calendasco	2,465	36.94	66.7
Caorso	4,797	40.98	117.1
Carpaneto Piacentino	7,775	63.08	123.3
Castel San Giovanni	14,402	44.04	327.0
Castell'Arquato	4,712	52.75	89.3
Castelvetro Piacentino	5,430	35.06	154.9
Cerignale	109	30.82	3.5
Coli	877	71.69	12.2
Corte Brugnatella	501	46.31	10.8
Cortemaggiore	4,757	36.47	130.4
Farini	1,044	112.36	9.3
Ferriere	1,081	178.50	6.1
Fiorenzuola d'Arda	15,048	59.77	251.8
Gazzola	2,201	44.48	49.5
Gossolengo	5,695	31.10	183.1
Gragnano Trebbiense	4,515	34.61	130.5
Gropparello	2,173	56.33	38.6
Lugagnano Val d'Arda	3,927	54.40	72.2
Monticelli d'Ongina	5,223	46.33	112.7
Morfasso	849	83.93	10.1
Ottone	390	98.96	3.9
Piacenza	103,737	118.24	877.3
Pianello Val Tidone	2,179	36.29	60.0
Piozzano	581	43.61	13.3
Podenzano	9,045	44.34	204.0
Ponte dell'Olio	4,694	43.92	106.9
Pontenure	6,719	33.85	198.5
Rivergaro	7,172	43.83	163.6
Rottofreno	12,320	35.17	350.3
San Giorgio Piacentino	5,586	49.19	113.6
San Pietro in Cerro	739	27.35	27.0
Sarmato	3,108	27.26	114.0
Travo	2,165	81.01	26.7
Vernasca	2,029	72.57	28.0
Vigolzone	4,324	42.04	102.9
Villanova sull'Arda	1,666	36.57	45.6
Zerba	66	24.13	2.7
Ziano Piacentino	2,550	32.78	77.8

== See also ==
- List of municipalities of Emilia-Romagna
- List of municipalities of Italy
