= Taro (department) =

Former French department in Italy (1808–1814)

Taro Dipartimento del Taro (Italian) Département du Taro (French)
- department of the First French Empire
- 1808–1814
- Location of Taro in France (1812)
- Capital: Parma
- Area
  - Coordinates: 44°48′N 10°20′E
  - 1812: 5,022.36 km^{2} (1,939.14 sq mi)
- Population
  - 1812: 376,558
- History
  - Annexion from the Duchy of Parma: 1808
  - Treaty of Paris: 1814
- Political subdivisions: 3 arrondissements
Preceded by	Succeeded by
Duchy of Parma	Duchy of Parma

Coat of arms of the French commune of Parma

Taro (French: [ta.ʁo]) was a department of the First French Empire in present-day Italy. It was named after the Taro River. It was formed in 1808, when the Duchy of Parma and Piacenza was annexed by France under the Treaty of Lunéville. Its capital was Parma.

The department was disbanded after the defeat of Napoleon in 1814. At the Congress of Vienna, the Duchy was restored and given to Marie Louise, Napoleon's wife. Its territory is now divided between the Italian provinces of Parma and Piacenza.

The most notable person born in the then-Département of Taro was the composer Giuseppe Verdi (born 9 or 10 October 1813 in the village of Le Roncole near Busseto).

== Subdivision ==
The department was subdivided into the following arrondissements and cantons (situation in 1812):

- Parma, cantons: Colorno, Corniglio, San Donato, Fornovo, Langhirano, San Pancrazio, Parma (2 cantons), Poviglio, Sissa, Traversetolo and Vairo.
- Piacenza (French: Plaisance), cantons: Agazzano, Bettola, Borgonovo, Castel San Giovanni, Pianello, Piacenza (2 cantons), Ponte dell'Olio, Pontenure, Rivergaro and Rottofreno.
- Borgo San Donnino, cantons: Bardi, Borgo San Donnino, Busseto, Carpaneto, Cortemaggiore, Fiorenzuola, Fontanellato, Lugagnano, Monticelli, Noceto, Pellegrino, San Secondo and Zibello.

Its population in 1812 was 376,558, and its area was approximately 502,236 hectares.
