= Murder of Elisa Pomarelli =

2019 murder in Italy

- Location: Carpaneto Piacentino, Emilia-Romagna, Italy
- Date: 25 August 2019; 2:00 PM – 3:00 PM approx.
- Injuries: Strangulation
- Victim: Elisa Pomarelli
- Perpetrator: Massimo Sebastiani
- Motive: Jealousy and homophobia

On August 25, 2019, 28-year-old Elisa Pomarelli was murdered by her friend, 45-year-old Massimo Sebastiani, in Carpaneto Piacentino, in the Province of Piacenza, Italy. Sebastiani stood trial and was sentenced to 20 years in prison. The case resulted in great indignation, public demonstrations, and stimulated the cultural debate on homophobia and violence against women in Italy.

== Events ==
Elisa Pomarelli was a 28-year-old woman, employed in her father's insurance company, living with her family in Piacenza, in the Borgotrebbia district. She had two sisters, and was openly lesbian. She also had a friend older than her, the 45-year-old Massimo Sebastiani, a co-worker who she had known for many years, living in Carpaneto Piacentino. Pomarelli had started to distance herself from Sebastiani, as the man had begun to show her increasingly insistent attentions.

On Sunday, August 25, 2019, Pomarelli and Sebastiani decided to go to lunch together in a restaurant in Ciriano, a hamlet of Carpaneto. Shortly after, around 2 pm, the two disappeared. The investigations and interrogations revealed that the two friends went to Sebastiani's house in Campogrande di Carpaneto. Pomarelli entered the chicken coop to collect some eggs to give to her sister, and she was attacked. The eggs, which Pomarelli had promised her sister in a chat, were found intact on the table of the shed next to a chainsaw. Investigators believe she was strangled by Sebastiani after Pomarelli said she wanted to get away from him and that she was in a relationship with a girl. Sebastiani put Pomarelli's body in the trunk of his Honda Civic, and in an attempt to turn off her cell phone, he mistakenly started a brief video call with another friend, before throwing the phone into a field. The phone was later tracked using a cell site in Cadeo. Sebastiani travelled to get petrol and then, around 3 pm, he headed to Costa di Sariano, a hamlet of Gropparello, in the Piacenza Apennines, to visit his ex-father-in-law, to whom he had written that he had argued with his friend. He buried Pomarelli's body in the surrounding woods and, around 4.30 pm, returned to Carpaneto, where he began to write some messages to Pomarelli's number and staged an online chat to build himself a possible alibi. He sent the last message around 7 pm. That evening, Sebastiani had dinner with another friend in a restaurant in Vigostano, in Castell'Arquato, and then stopped for a drink on the way back home. According to a witness, the last sighting of Sebastiani that day was around midnight, on the edge of a road in Sariano di Gropparello.

=== Escape and arrest ===
On Monday, 26 August, 2019, the day after Pomarelli's disappearance, her family officially raised the alarm, and the local authorities, with a considerable deployment of forces including firefighters, Civil Protection, local police and ANPAS (also free volunteers and, later, the Grenadiers of Sardinia), began the search for Pomarelli and Sebastiani in Val Chero. They also searched Sebastiani's home, on which the investigators immediately focused their attention. The searches were unsuccessful, and were extended. On August 31, Sebastiani was officially entered in the register of suspects, but only for kidnapping, since there was possibility that Pomarelli was not dead. It was thought that she may have been kidnapped and was being held in an unknown location.

For 13 days, Sebastiani managed to escape capture by living in the woods, foraging, and then taking refuge again in the house of his former father-in-law in Sariano. His former father-in-law, meanwhile, had been imprisoned on charges of having helped Sebastiani escape, although he was later released. Sebastiani lived in the house for several days, dividing his time between the attic of the home and the ditch where he had buried Pomarelli's body, where he sometimes slept.

On Saturday, September 7, 2019, in the late morning, the Carabinieri arrested Sebastiani, who was hiding in an abandoned farmhouse in Monte Moria Provincial Park. He was subsequently taken to Sariano to look for Pomarelli, and her body was found one metre below ground. Sebastiani then admitted to the murder. On September 12, 2019, the autopsy on the Pomarelli's body confirmed death by strangulation.

=== Processing ===
After the confession of the murder, Sebastiani's lawyer requested a psychiatric assessment, which established that he understood the charges. On August 4, 2020, at the preliminary hearing in the Piacenza court, an abbreviated trial was requested and obtained for Sebastiani, which guaranteed a reduction in the sentence. By Italian law, the abbreviated trial cannot be applied in cases of aggravated homicide (which include femicide), but in this case, the charge was simply voluntary homicide, since Sebastiani was neither the husband nor the partner of the victim.

On August 24, 2020, almost a year after her killing, Pomarelli's funeral was held in the church of Santi Angeli Custodi in Borgotrebbia, and the then-mayor Patrizia Barbieri proclaimed a day of mourning.

On July 19, 2021, the court sentenced Sebastiani to 20 years in prison, a sentence that caused dismay among Pomarelli's family and friends, and which was confirmed on appeal on July 6, 2022. On November 20, 2022, Sebastiani renounced his right to appeal to the Supreme Court. He is currently incarcerated in the Piacenza "Le Novate" prison.

== Reaction ==
There were numerous controversies due to the narration of the events given by some newspapers, including Il Giornale, which, referring to Sebastiani, defined the murderer as a "good giant" who had acted in a "love fit". The definition was criticized by the then-president of the order of journalists Carlo Verna.

== Influence in media ==
=== Film ===
In 2022, the documentary film Uccisa due volte — Il caso Pomarelli by Alessandro Galluzzi was made for Crime + Investigation, which recounts the murder with interviews and unpublished footage.

=== Events ===
The organizers of Novara Pride, held on 14 September 2019, dedicated the event to the memory of Elisa Pomarelli.

Since 2022, the "Femme Fest — The Festival to say NO to femicide" has been held every September in Piacenza. It is a series of meetings on gender violence, held in memory of Elisa Pomarelli.
