= Lake Mignano =

Artificial lake in Emilia-Romagna, Italy

- Interactive map of Lake Mignano
- Location: Morfasso, Vernasca, Province of Piacenza, Emilia-Romagna, Italy
- Coordinates: 44°43′12″N 9°43′48″E
- Type: Artificial
- Primary inflows: Arda
- Primary outflows: Arda
- Surface area: 2 km^{2} (0.77 sq mi)
- Average depth: 16.05 m (52.7 ft)
- Max. depth: 45.3 m (149 ft)
- Surface elevation: 341 m (1,119 ft)

The Lake Mignano is an artificial lake in Italy, located between the municipalities of Morfasso and Vernasca, in the Province of Piacenza, along the course of the Arda stream, created by the construction of the eponymous dam for hydroelectric purposes.

== Geography ==
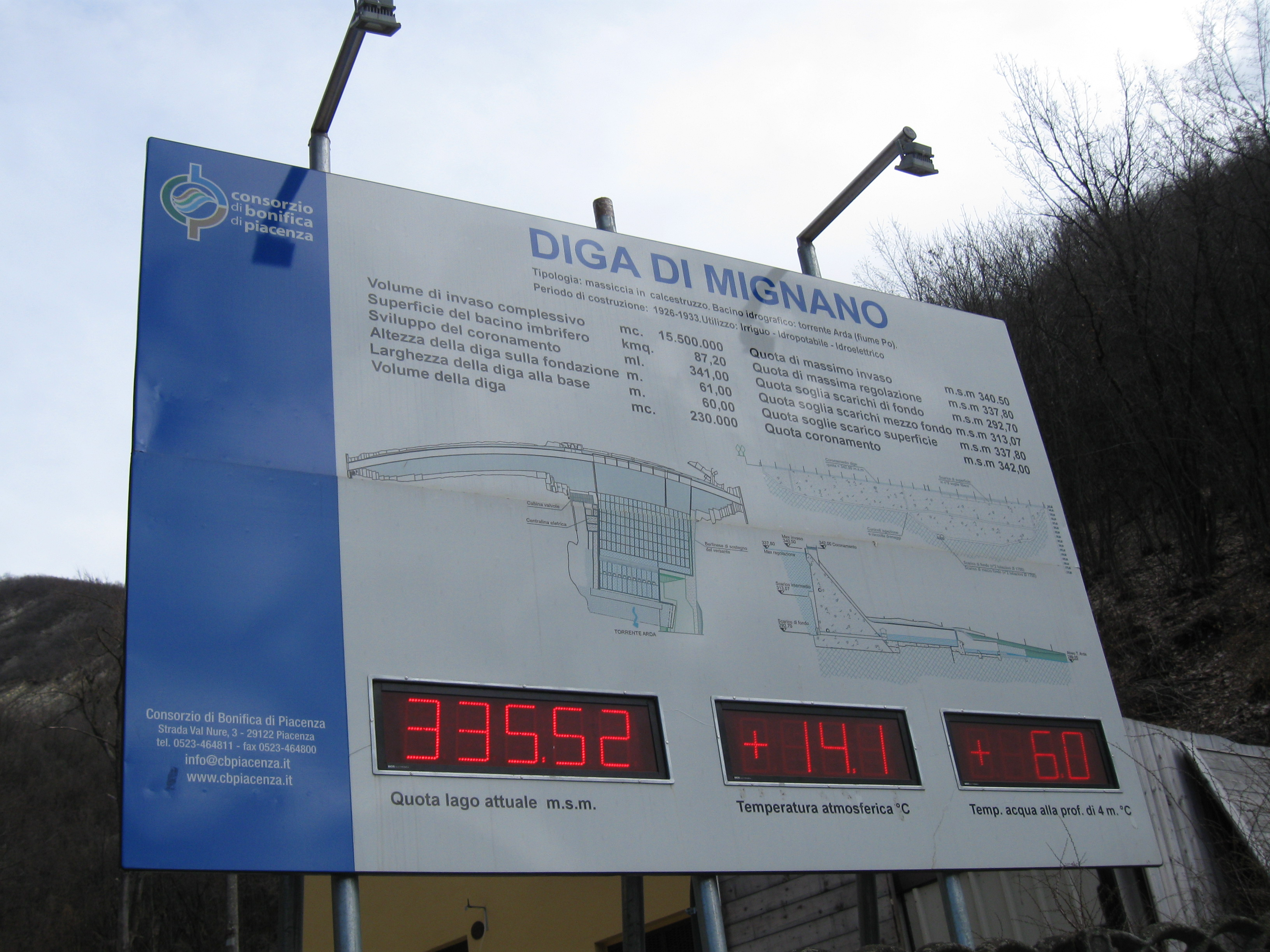
Information panel located near the dam

The lake, situated at an elevation of 341 m (1,119 ft) above sea level, is just under 3 km (1.9 mi) long, with a surface area of 810,000 m^{2} (8,700,000 sq ft). The original capacity of the lake was 15.15 million cubic meters, later reduced following safety regulations starting in 1969. Following works carried out on the reservoir from 1996, the lake's capacity stabilized at 11.8 million cubic meters.

The average depth of the lake is 16.05 m (52.7 ft), while the maximum depth reaches 45.3 m (149 ft). The drainage basin feeding the lake extends over 87.2 km^{2} (33.7 sq mi), equivalent to 40% of the entire Arda stream basin and 80% of its montane portion.

== History ==
The first proposals for exploiting the waters of the Arda stream were put forward in the late 1880s; however, the initial practical steps toward building a dam occurred only between 1918 and 1919. On 9 November 1918, the Committee of Promoters for the construction of the Val d'Arda reservoir was established, with participation from, among others, Senator Vittorio Cipelli. The following year, the Val d'Arda Irrigation Consortium was formed, led by agronomist Pasquale Verani from Fiorenzuola d'Arda, who had been part of the previous committee. The consortium's founding included several landowners from the Val d'Arda. The consortium was created in anticipation of building a series of infrastructures, with the dam as the main component, to manage the Arda's waters for irrigation purposes for the agricultural plots of the lowlands, which suffered from particularly dry summers due to inadequate irrigation infrastructure.

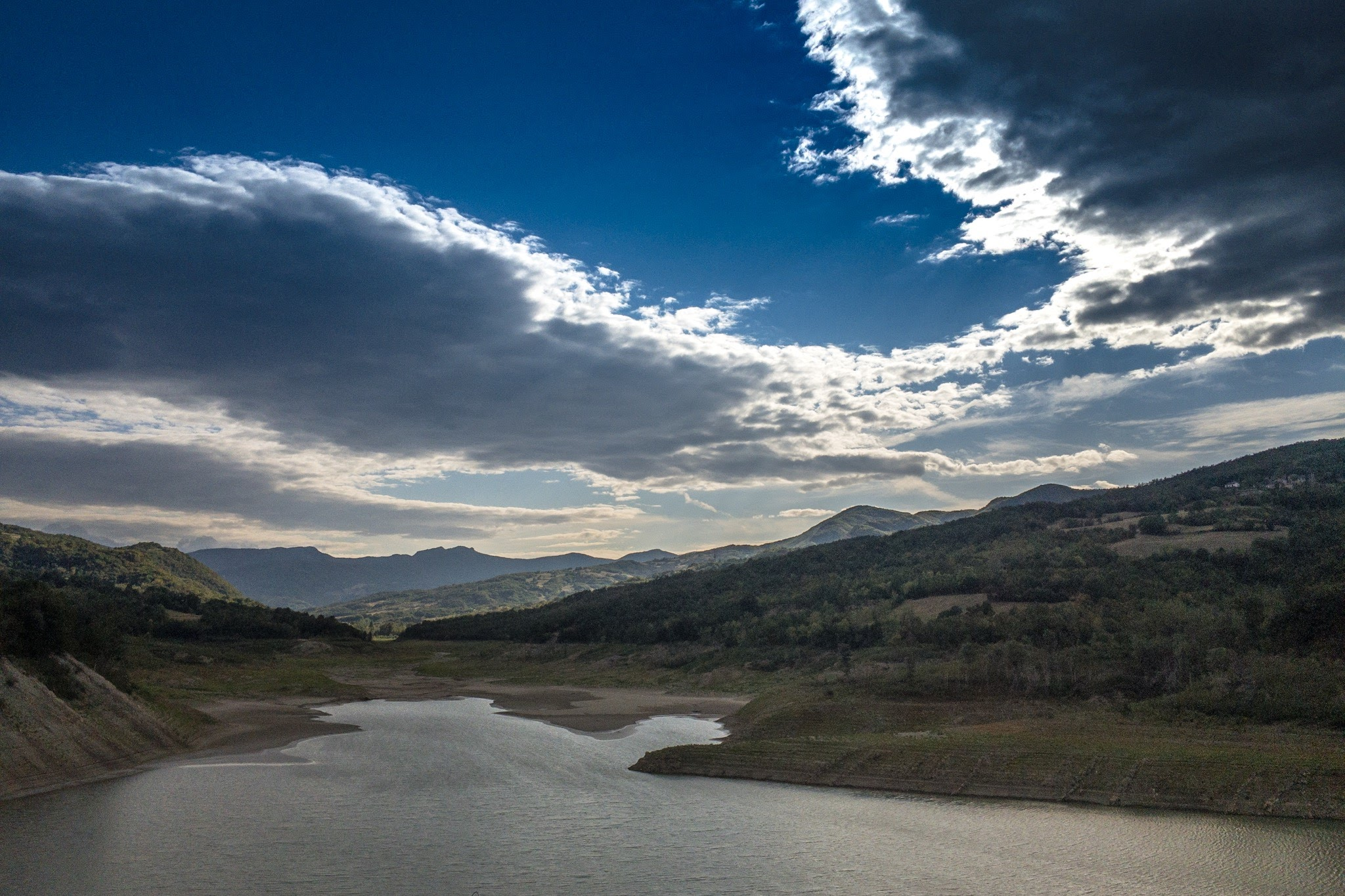
The basin during drought in the summer of 2017

On 31 October 1919, a 70-year concession was granted for the irrigation and hydroelectric use of the Arda's waters. Subsequently, the consortium's board commissioned engineer Augusto Ballerio to design the dam and all necessary structures; the estimated costs for the project, around 100 million lire, were covered by loans secured by the properties of the consortium's founding members. In March 1926, the construction of the dam was awarded to the company led by engineer Vincenzo Lodigiani.

The dam, a massive gravity structure of the triangular Castigliano type, was built in concrete with curved blocks characterized by circular arcs with a radius of 500 m (1,600 ft) embedded within. The structure's height from the base was 64 m (210 ft), the height from the riverbed 54 m (177 ft), and the foundation thickness 55 m (180 ft). The crest was 340 m (1,120 ft) long and 6 m (20 ft) wide.

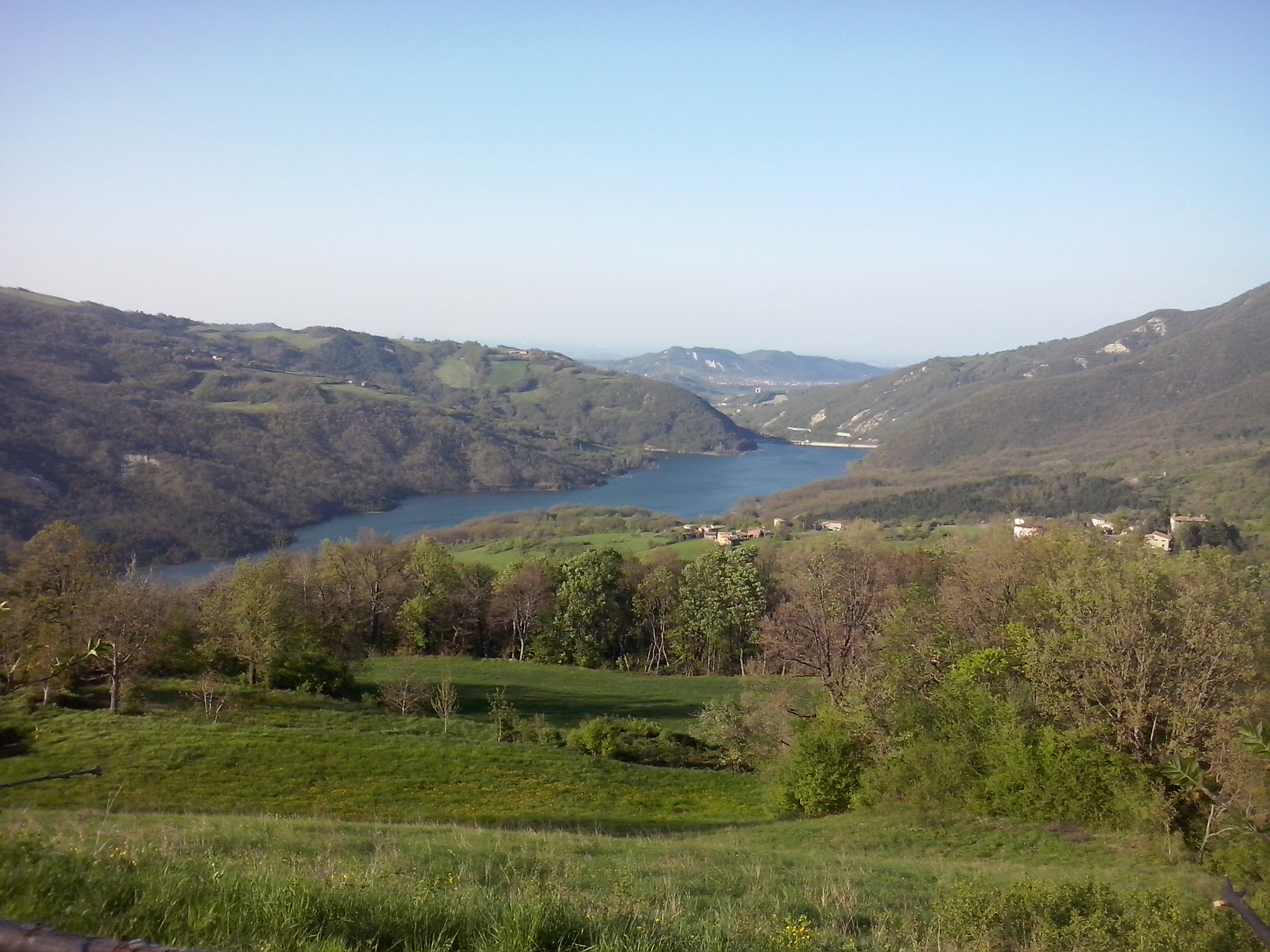
The lake seen from Vezzolacca

The dam was inaugurated on 24 May 1934 in the presence of Senator Arrigo Serpieri, Undersecretary of Agriculture, who witnessed the opening of the sluice gates, and the Bishop of Piacenza, Ersilio Menzani, who blessed the structure.

Following the dam's completion, the consortium proceeded to build a network of canals for distributing the collected waters, with an extent that grew to nearly 400 km (250 mi).

In the late 1950s, Saice, a company owning a cement factory in Vernasca, obtained a concession to use the dam for hydroelectric power generation; a small power plant was built, enabling an annual energy production ranging between 2.4 and 5 GWh (18 TJ).

In 1969, the lake's original capacity was reduced by 10% following a directive from the Civil Engineering Office of Piacenza to maintain a freeboard of 2 m (6 ft 7 in) below the maximum reservoir level.

Starting in 1996, the dam underwent a series of interventions, divided into two phases, which increased the lake's capacity from 10.25 to 11.8 million cubic meters by 2018, upon completion of the testing of the modifications. Concurrently with the works, hydroelectric power production ceased; in 2010, new facilities were built to house electrical production equipment, though they did not become operational in the following years.
