= Florentius of Orange =

Saint Florentius of Orange (French: Florent d'Orange) was bishop of the city of Orange in France around 517–524. Recognized as a saint by the Roman Catholic Church, his feast day is on 17 October.

He was known for his generosity and for various miracles.

He was Bishop of Orange during the capture of the city by the Ostrogoths and was deported with its inhabitants to Fiorenzuola d'Arda near Piacenza, of which he is now the patron saint. He was released thanks to the intervention of the bishop Caesarius of Arles, who interceded on his behalf with the king Theodoric the Great.

He died around the year 525.

His relics are shared between Avignon Cathedral and Le Puy Cathedral, and the churches of Saint-Florent in Orange, Saint-Pierre-aux-Liens in Laussonne and the collegiate church of San Fiorenzo in Fiorenzuola.

== See also ==
- Catholic Church in France
