= Arda (Italy) =

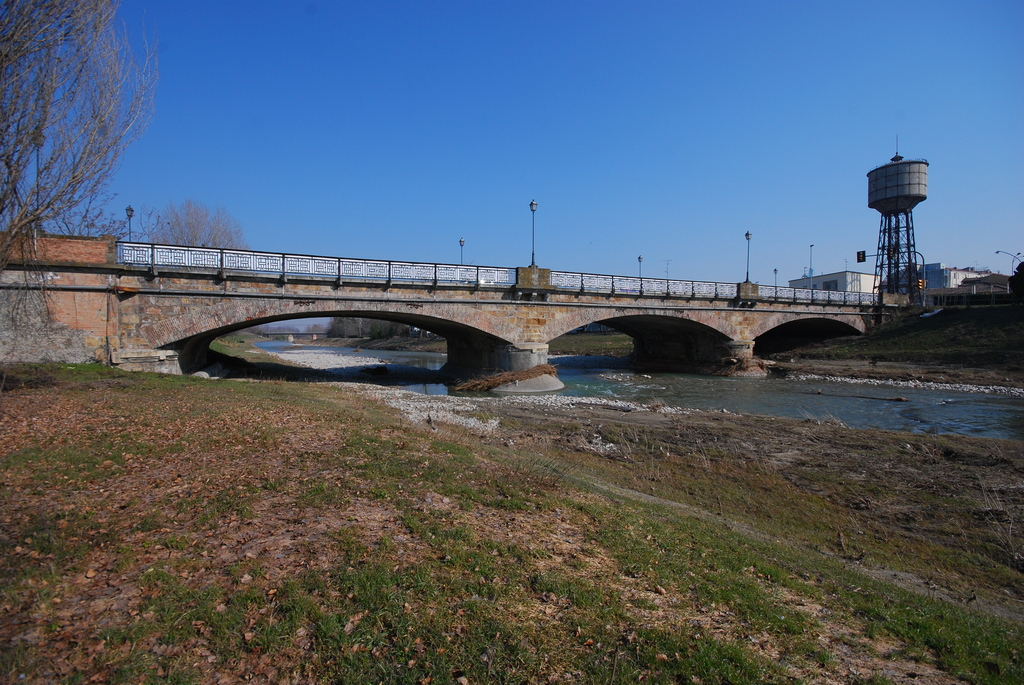

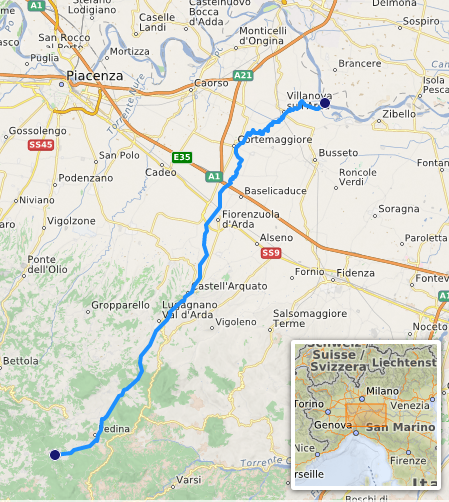

Location
- Country: Italy

Physical characteristics
- Source
  - location: Monte Lama, Ligurian Apennines
  - elevation: 1,200 m (3,900 ft)
- Mouth
  - location: Po, near Polesine Parmense
  - coordinates: 45°02′05″N 10°03′13″E
- Length: 56 km (35 mi)
- Discharge
  - average: 5 m^{3}/s (180 cu ft/s)

Basin features
- Progression: Po→ Adriatic Sea

The Arda is a torrent of Emilia-Romagna, Italy, nearly all of its course being within the province of Piacenza. It is a right tributary of the Po River.

It rises at an elevation of 1,200 metres (3,900 ft) in the Ligurian Apennines on the north-west slopes of Monte Lama (near Monte Menegosa), within the commune of Morfasso. After about 15 kilometres (9 mi), at an elevation of 341 metres (1,119 ft), it is dammed to form the Lago di Mignano reservoir which covers about 2 square kilometres (0.77 mi^{2}) and provides both a water supply and hydro-electric power.

The stream then flows through Lugagnano Val d'Arda and Castell'Arquato.

Afterwards it enters the plain, where it passes through Fiorenzuola d'Arda and Cortemaggiore. Before entering the Po, near Polesine Parmense, it is joined on the right by another torrent, the Ongina, whose source is in the Piacenza hills, between Alseno and Castell'Arquato.

The Arda follows the typical pattern of an Apennine torrent with maximum discharges during the spring and autumn rains and a minimal flow during the summer.
