= Ettore Guglieri =

Italian footballer (born 1984)

Personal information
- Date of birth: 11 January 1984 (age 42)
- Place of birth: Ponte dell'Olio, Italy
- Height: 1.74 m (5 ft 9 in)
- Position: Defender

Youth career
- –2002: Piacenza

Senior career*
Years	Team	Apps	(Gls)
2002–2004	Voghera	63	(7)
2004–2006	Pizzighettone	26	(0)
2006–2007	La Biellese	32	(1)
2007–2008	Massese	23	(0)
2008–2010	Lecco	53	(0)
2010	Dellese	9	(0)
2010–2012	Carpenedolo	47	(0)
2012–2014	Montichiari	32	(2)
2014–2022	Fiorenzuola	223	(7)
- * Club domestic league appearances and goals

Ettore Guglieri (born 11 January 1984) is an Italian former professional footballer who played as a defender.

== Club career ==
Guglieri joined to Fiorenzuola in 2014. On 16 February 2021, he played his 500th match for the club. On 16 July 2021 he renewed his contract and is the captain of the team. Guglieri retired in April 2022.
