= San Giorgio Piacentino =

- Comune
- Comune di San Giorgio Piacentino
- Coat of arms

- Location within Italy Location within Emilia-Romagna
- Coordinates: 44°57′N 9°44′E
- Country: Italy
- Region: Emilia-Romagna
- Province: Piacenza (PC)
- Frazioni: San Damiano, Godi, Centovera, Rizzolo, Ronco, Tollara, Corneliano, Viustino, Case Nuove

Government
  - Mayor: Donatella Alberoni

Area
  - Total: 49.1 km^{2} (19.0 sq mi)
- Elevation: 103 m (338 ft)

Population (31 December 2014)
  - Total: 5,810
  - Density: 118/km^{2} (306/sq mi)
- Demonym: Sangiorgini
- Time zone: UTC+1 (CET)
  - Summer (DST): UTC+2 (CEST)
- Postal code: 29019
- Dialing code: 0523
- Patron saint: St. George
- Saint day: 23 April
- Website: Official website

San Giorgio Piacentino (Piacentino: San Zorz, IPA: [saŋ ˈzɔːrz] or [saŋ ˈzɔːʁz]) is a comune (municipality) in the Province of Piacenza in the Italian region Emilia-Romagna, located about 140 kilometres (87 mi) northwest of Bologna and about 11 kilometres (7 mi) south of Piacenza.

San Giorgio Piacentino borders the following municipalities: Carpaneto Piacentino, Gropparello, Podenzano, Ponte dell'Olio, Pontenure, Vigolzone.
