= San Polo, Podenzano =

Church building in Podenzano, Italy

San Polo is the 16th-century Roman Catholic parish church located on Via all Chiesa #10 in the town of Podenzano, Province of Piacenza, region of Emilia-Romagna, Italy.

== History ==
The layout of the contemporary parish dates to 1520. The first church on the site was razed and burned by the troops of Galeazzo Visconti in 1321. The neoclassical-style façade and interiors was refurbished in 1843. The interiors were frescoed by Alberto Aspetti and Nazareno Sidoli.
