= Besenzone =

- Comune
- Comune di Besenzone
- Coat of arms

- Location within Italy Location within Emilia-Romagna
- Coordinates: 44°59′N 9°57′E
- Country: Italy
- Region: Emilia-Romagna
- Province: Piacenza (PC)

Government
  - Mayor: Carlo Filiberti

Area
  - Total: 23.9 km^{2} (9.2 sq mi)
- Elevation: 48 m (157 ft)

Population (31 December 2010)
  - Total: 989
  - Density: 41.4/km^{2} (107/sq mi)
- Time zone: UTC+1 (CET)
  - Summer (DST): UTC+2 (CEST)
- Postal code: 29010
- Dialing code: 0523
- Website: Official website

Besenzone (Piacentino: Bsinson [bziŋˈsoŋ]) is a comune (municipality) in the Province of Piacenza in the Italian region Emilia-Romagna, located about 120 kilometres (75 mi) northwest of Bologna and about 20 kilometres (12 mi) southeast of Piacenza.

Besenzone borders the following municipalities: Alseno, Busseto, Cortemaggiore, Fiorenzuola d'Arda, Villanova sull'Arda.
