= Vigolzone =

- Comune
- Comune di Vigolzone
- Location within Italy Location within Emilia-Romagna
- Coordinates: 44°55′N 9°40′E
- Country: Italy
- Region: Emilia-Romagna
- Province: Piacenza (PC)
- Frazioni: Grazzano Visconti, Cabina, Borgo di Sotto, Villò, Albarola, Carmiano, Bicchignano, Veano, Chiulano

Government
  - Mayor: Gianluca Argellati

Area
  - Total: 42.3 km^{2} (16.3 sq mi)
- Elevation: 151 m (495 ft)

Population (30 September 2014)
  - Total: 4,275
  - Density: 101/km^{2} (262/sq mi)
- Demonym: Vigolzonesi
- Time zone: UTC+1 (CET)
  - Summer (DST): UTC+2 (CEST)
- Postal code: 29020
- Dialing code: 0523
- Patron saint: St. John the Baptist
- Saint day: June 24
- Website: Official website

Vigolzone (Piacentino: Vigulson) is a comune (municipality) in the Province of Piacenza in the Italian region Emilia-Romagna, located about 140 kilometres (87 mi) northwest of Bologna and about 15 kilometres (9 mi) south of Piacenza.

Vigolzone borders the following municipalities: Bettola, Podenzano, Ponte dell'Olio, Rivergaro, San Giorgio Piacentino, Travo.

In the early 20th century, the frazione of Grazzano received the name Visconti when Giuseppe Visconti, father of the filmmaker Luchino, restored the medieval castle built there by Gian Galeazzo Visconti for his half-sister Beatrice Visconti, daughter of Galeazzo II Visconti and his mistress Malgarola da Lucino - it remained in the family of her first husband Giovanni Anguissola (1340/1350-post 1395) until 1884.
