= San Germano e San Giovanni Bosco, Podenzano =

Roman Catholic church in Piacenza province, Italy

Coordinates: 44°57′24.3″N 9°41′23.1″E

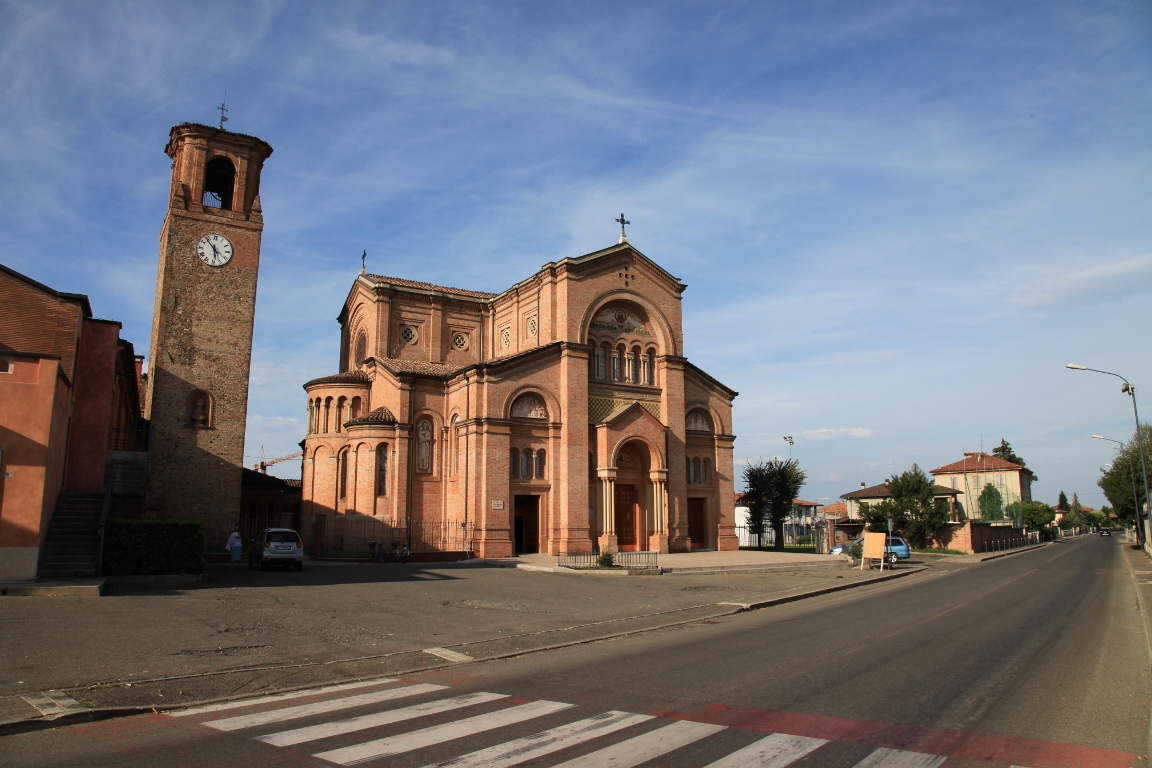
Church of San Germano

San Germano e San Giovanni Bosco is the 20th-century Roman Catholic parish church of Podenzano, Province of Piacenza, region of Emilia-Romagna, Italy.

== Art and Architecture ==
Construction of the church began in 1934, and the church was consecrated in 1940. The architect Camillo Uccelli designed the Neo-Romanesque church with some Byzantine architectural touches, including a Greek-cross layout.

The interior declaration was performed by Uso Albertelli and Alberto Aspetti. The image of the Redeemer on the facade was painted by Ernesto Giacobbi. The organ is originally derived from the Cathedral of Piacenza. From 1957-1978, the painter Luciano Ricchetti completed a cycle of frescoes including two lateral chapels dedicated to the Rosary and St John Bosco. He also painted the Via Crucis series throughout the aisles, a Holy Trinity on the counterfacade, and the Symbols of the Four Evangelists and the Virgin with the Bible in the apse.

The sculptor Paolo Perotti completed the Sacrifice of Abraham statue, and on the exterior facades, a Nativity, Annunciation, and Madonna and child. In 1975, the painter Pietro Delfitto has painted a Marriage of the Virgin. The painter-jeweller Francesco Maria Martini decorated the chapels of San Antonio, San Francesco, and of the Holy Family, the portal depicting the Apparition of the Risen Christ to Mary Magdalen, and a Virgin of Fatima.
