= Abbey of Chiaravalle della Colomba =

Cistercian monastic complex in Italy

Coordinates: 44.926°N 9.974°E

The Abbey of Chiaravalle della Colomba (Italian: Abbazia di Chiaravalle della Colomba) is a 12th-century Cistercian monastic complex near the town of Alseno, in the Province of Piacenza, Region of Emilia-Romagna, Italy.

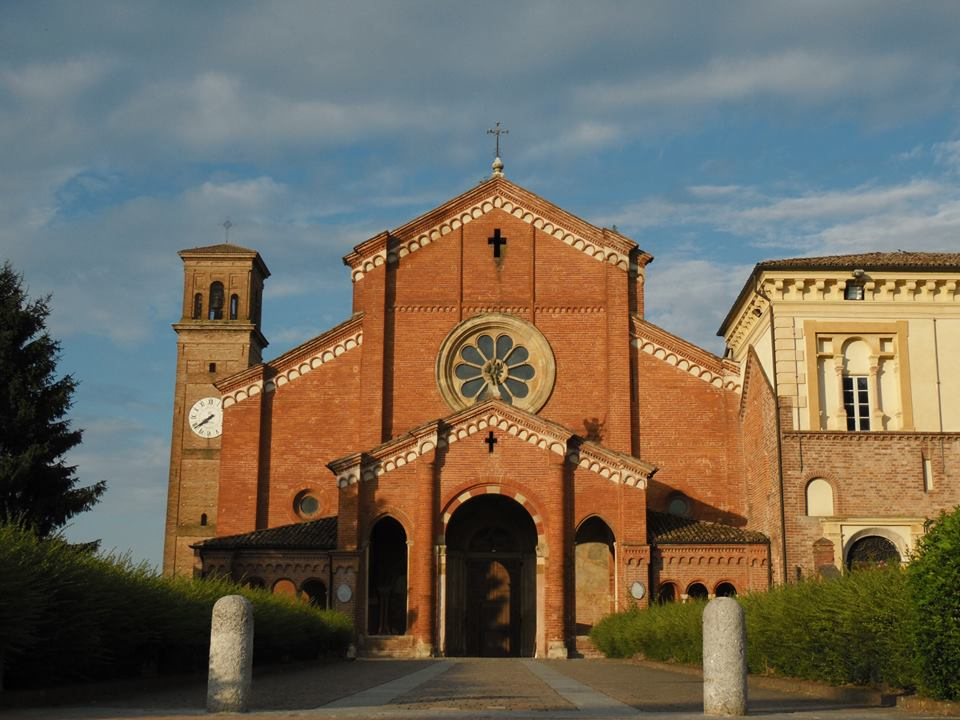
Facade of church

== History ==
The founding documents for the Abbey date to 11 April 1136, when Arduino, the bishop of Piacenza, granted the monastery its lands. The abbey was also patronized by the Marquises Oberto Pallavicino and Corrado Cavalcabò. One tradition holds that the name Colomba or pigeon was attached due to a legend that a white pigeon had selected the site. But more likely the title Santa Maria della Colomba derives from the pigeon used to symbolize the annunciation of Mary's pregnancy. The abbey was founded soon after the other Abbey of Chiaravalle, also called Chiaravalle Milanese was founded near Milan.

The monastery was sacked and burned in 1248 by Frederick II of Swabia during his siege of Parma. In 1769, the abbey was suppressed by the Duke of Parma, and the remaining monks were moved to the Abbey of San Martino de' Bocci. The order was able to repurchase the abbey some 8 years later. However, by 1805, Napoleon's rule had again led to suppression of the order. In 1810, the surrounding properties were assigned to the Civil Hospital of Piacenza. The archive, library, and much of the property was dispersed and sold.

Cistercian monks were only to return in 1937; and the property has joint ownership with the state. The cloistered monks maintain limited agricultural efforts.

== Architecture ==
The church was erected during the 12th and 13th centuries, but was refurbished during the 15th century. The belltower was added in the 16th century. In the 19th century, restorations encountered buildings in near ruin. The church has Gothic architecture and Romanesque architecture elements. It retains the tomb of Oberto Pallavacino (died 1148). The square 13th-century cloister has a proliferation of arched openings, flanked by rose marble paired columns.
