= Cadeo =

- Comune
- Comune di Cadeo
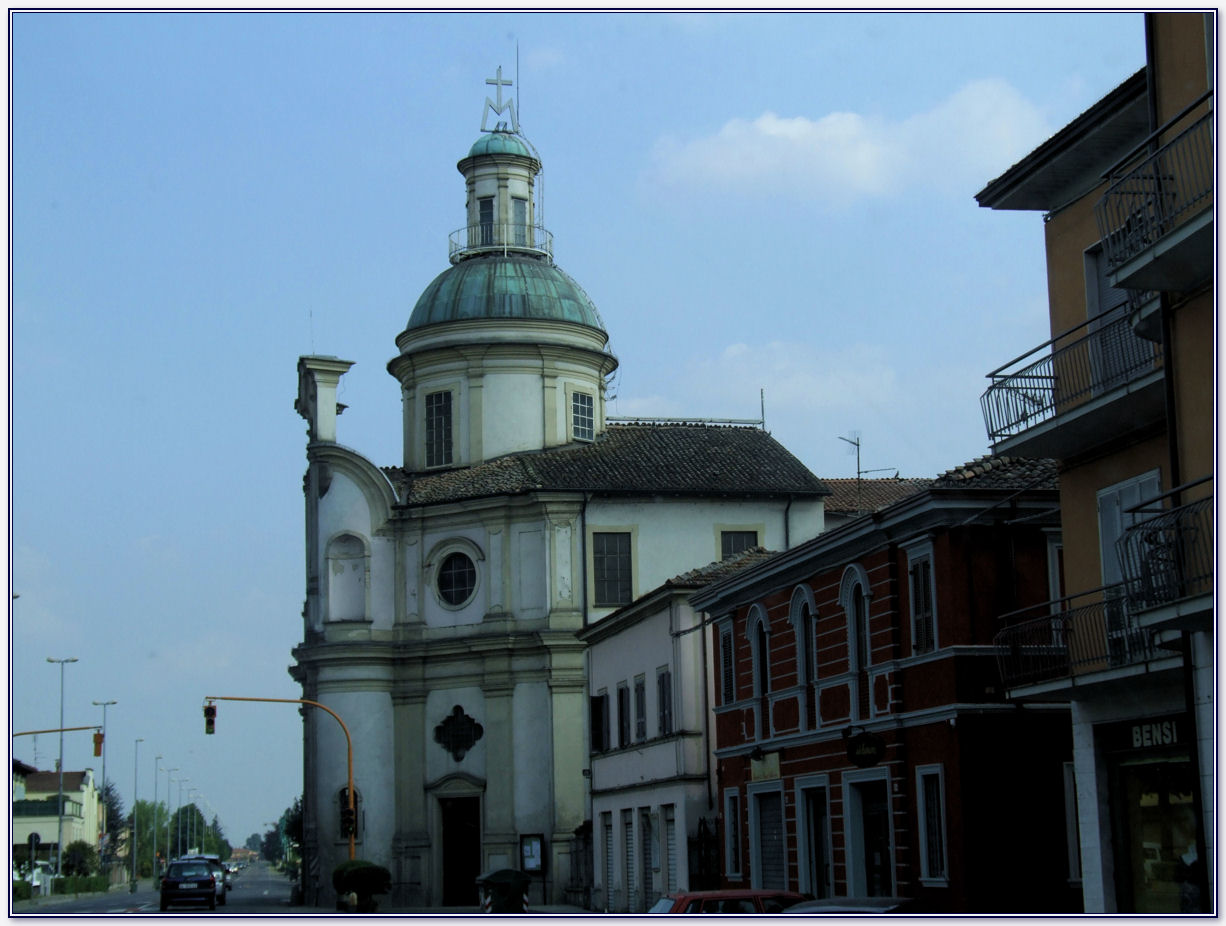

- Location within Italy Location within Emilia-Romagna
- Coordinates: 44°58′N 9°50′E
- Country: Italy
- Region: Emilia-Romagna
- Province: Piacenza (PC)
- Frazioni: Roveleto, Saliceto, Fontana Fredda

Government
  - Mayor: Maria Lodovica Toma

Area
  - Total: 38.6 km^{2} (14.9 sq mi)
- Elevation: 65 m (213 ft)

Population (Dec. 2004)
  - Total: 5,601
  - Density: 145/km^{2} (376/sq mi)
- Time zone: UTC+1 (CET)
  - Summer (DST): UTC+2 (CEST)
- Postal code: 29010
- Dialing code: 0523
- Website: Official website

Cadeo (Piacentino: La Cadé or Cadé) is a town and comune (municipality) in the province of Piacenza, in the Italian region of Emilia-Romagna, located about 130 kilometres (81 mi) northwest of Bologna and about 14 kilometres (9 mi) southeast of Piacenza. It has about 5,600 inhabitants. The name is derived from Italian, meaning "House of God". This refers to a time when Cadeo was a stop-over for Christian pilgrims. The photo of the church accompanying this article is actually on the Via Emilia in Roveleto.

Cadeo borders the following municipalities: Carpaneto Piacentino, Cortemaggiore, Fiorenzuola d'Arda, Pontenure. The Municipal Building for Cadeo is located in Roveleto, which is to the south-east on the Via Emilia. Roveleto is also the site of the closest railroad station to Cadeo.

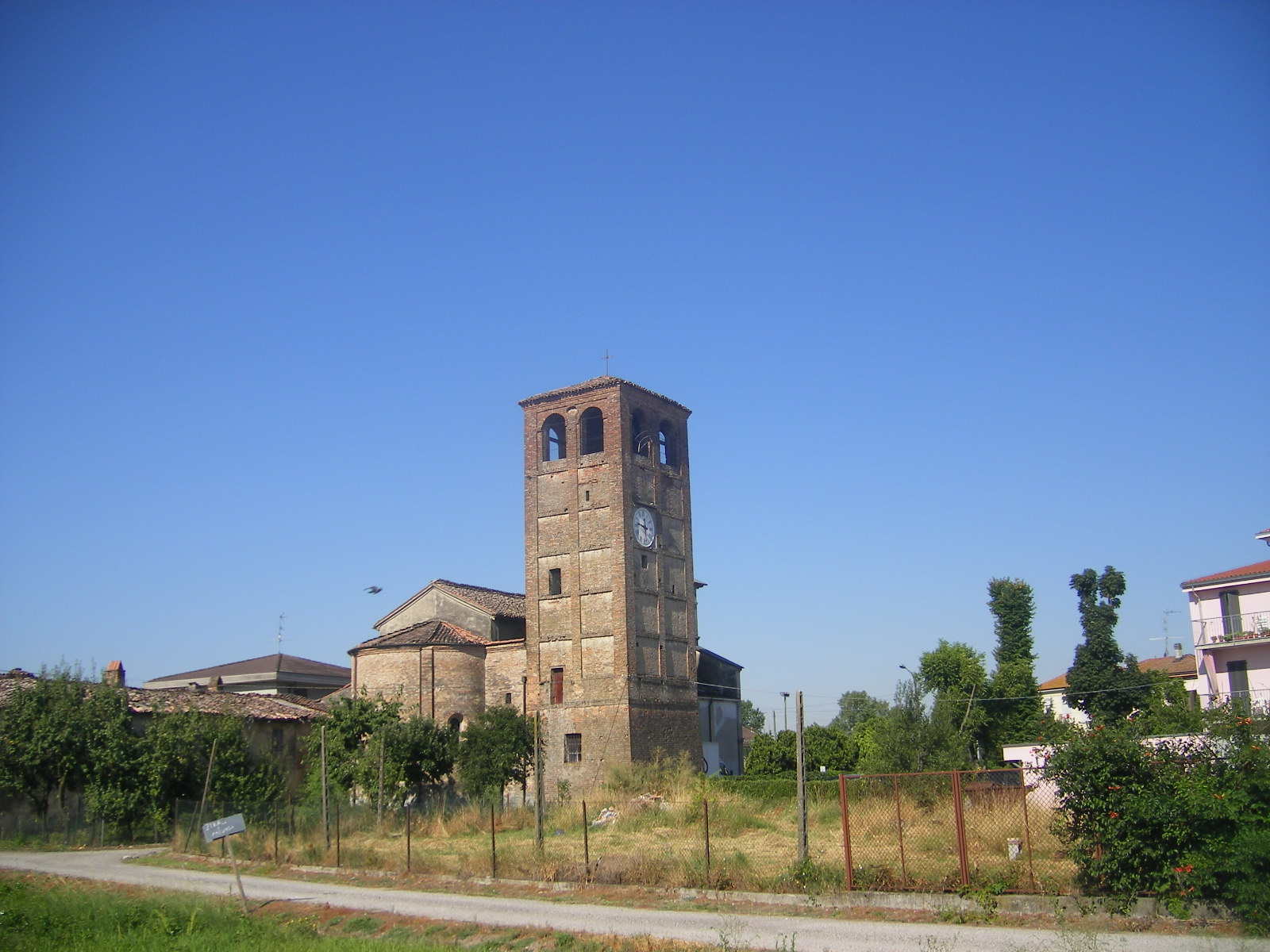
Fontana Fredda tower

== Demographic evolution ==
Historical population

Year	Pop.	±%
1861	2,931	—
1871	3,338	+13.9%
1881	3,362	+0.7%
1901	3,394	+1.0%
1911	3,671	+8.2%

Year	Pop.	±%
1921	4,197	+14.3%
1931	4,281	+2.0%
1936	4,309	+0.7%
1951	4,536	+5.3%
1961	4,206	−7.3%

Year	Pop.	±%
1971	4,280	+1.8%
1981	4,616	+7.9%
1991	5,396	+16.9%
2001	5,459	+1.2%

Source: Data from ISTAT

== Twin towns ==
Cadeo is twinned with:

- Marsaxlokk, Malta
