= Alseno =

- Comune
- Comune di Alseno
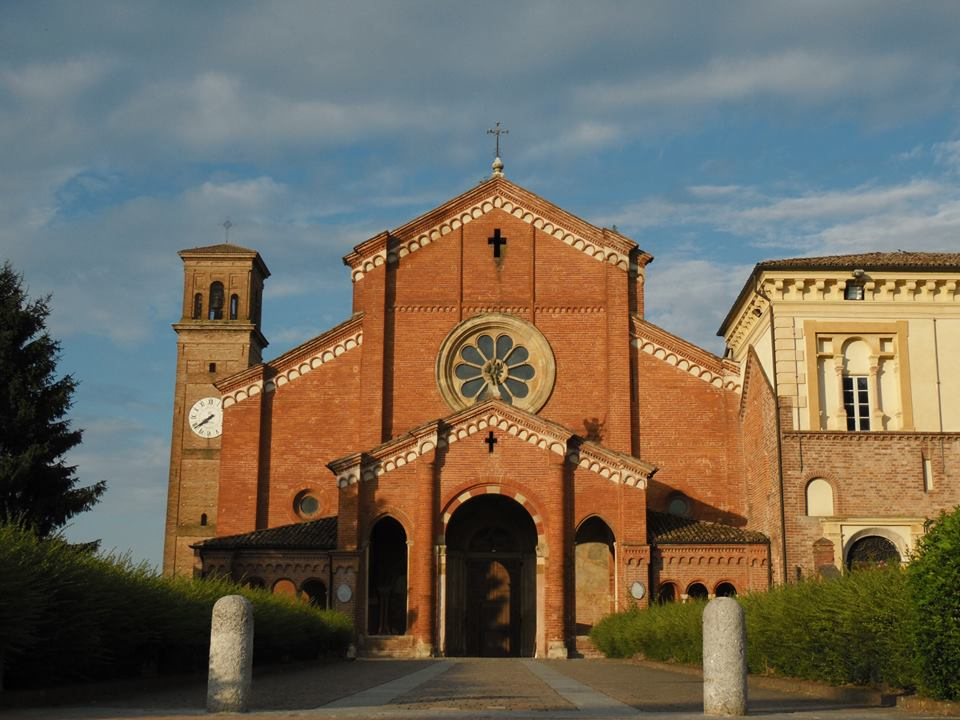
- Abbey of Chiaravalle della Colomba

- Location of Alseno in Italy Alseno (Emilia-Romagna)
- Coordinates: 44°54′N 9°58′E
- Country: Italy
- Region: Emilia-Romagna
- Province: Piacenza (PC)
- Frazioni: Castelnuovo Fogliani, Chiaravalle della Colomba, Cortina, Lusurasco

Government
  - Mayor: Davide Zucchi

Area
  - Total: 55.27 km^{2} (21.34 sq mi)
- Elevation: 79 m (259 ft)

Population (30 April 2017)
  - Total: 4,695
  - Density: 84.95/km^{2} (220.0/sq mi)
- Demonym: Alsenesi
- Time zone: UTC+1 (CET)
  - Summer (DST): UTC+2 (CEST)
- Postal code: 29010
- Dialing code: 0523
- Website: Official website

Alseno (Piacentino: Alsen [ɐlˈsɛŋ] or Alsëin [ɐlˈsəi̯]) is a comune (municipality) in the Province of Piacenza in the Italian region Emilia-Romagna, located about 120 kilometres (75 mi) northwest of Bologna and about 25 kilometres (16 mi) southeast of Piacenza.

Alseno borders the following municipalities: Besenzone, Busseto, Castell'Arquato, Fidenza, Fiorenzuola d'Arda, Salsomaggiore Terme, Vernasca.
