= Vernasca =

- Comune
- Comune di Vernasca
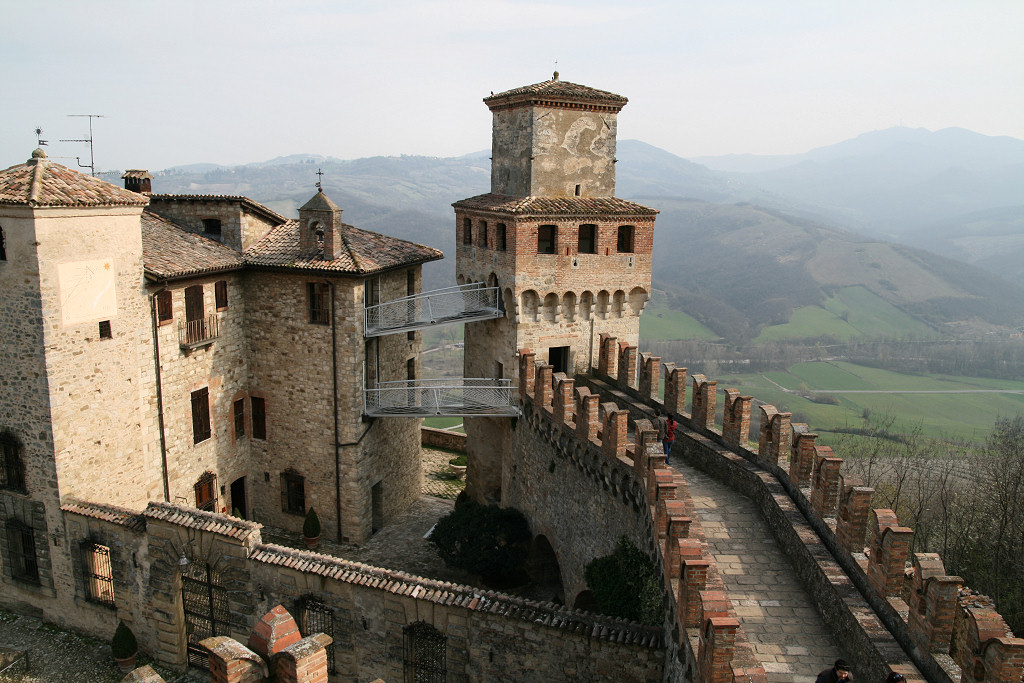
- Castle of Vigoleno.

- Location within Italy Location within Emilia-Romagna
- Coordinates: 44°47′58″N 9°49′50″E
- Country: Italy
- Region: Emilia-Romagna
- Province: Piacenza (PC)
- Frazioni: Bacedasco, Borla, Castelletto, Mignano, Settesorelle, Trinità, Vezzolacca, Vigoleno, Mazzaschi,

Government
  - Mayor: Gian Luigi Molinari

Area
  - Total: 72.57 km^{2} (28.02 sq mi)
- Elevation: 457 m (1,499 ft)

Population (30 September 2017)
  - Total: 2,200
  - Density: 30/km^{2} (79/sq mi)
- Demonym: Vernaschini
- Time zone: UTC+1 (CET)
  - Summer (DST): UTC+2 (CEST)
- Postal code: 29010
- Dialing code: 0523
- Website: Official website

Vernasca (Piacentino: (La) Varnasca [(lɐ) vɐrˈnaskɐ]) is a comune (municipality) in the Province of Piacenza in the Italian region Emilia-Romagna, located about 120 kilometres (75 mi) northwest of Bologna and about 30 kilometres (19 mi) southeast of Piacenza. It is one of I Borghi più belli d'Italia ("The most beautiful villages of Italy").

The urban center of Vernasca has the Romanesque-style church of San Giorgio Martire. The church was built in the 12th century and was subordinate to the parish of Castell’Arquato until 1346. The interior has 15th-century frescoes.

The municipality of Vernasca contains the frazioni (subdivisions, mainly villages and hamlets) Bacedasco, Borla, Castelletto, Mignano, Settesorelle, Trinità, Vezzolacca, and Vigoleno. Vernasca borders the following municipalities: Alseno, Bore, Castell'Arquato, Lugagnano Val d'Arda, Morfasso, Pellegrino Parmense, Salsomaggiore Terme.

== See also ==
- Lake Mignano
