= Pontenure =

- Comune
- Comune di Pontenure
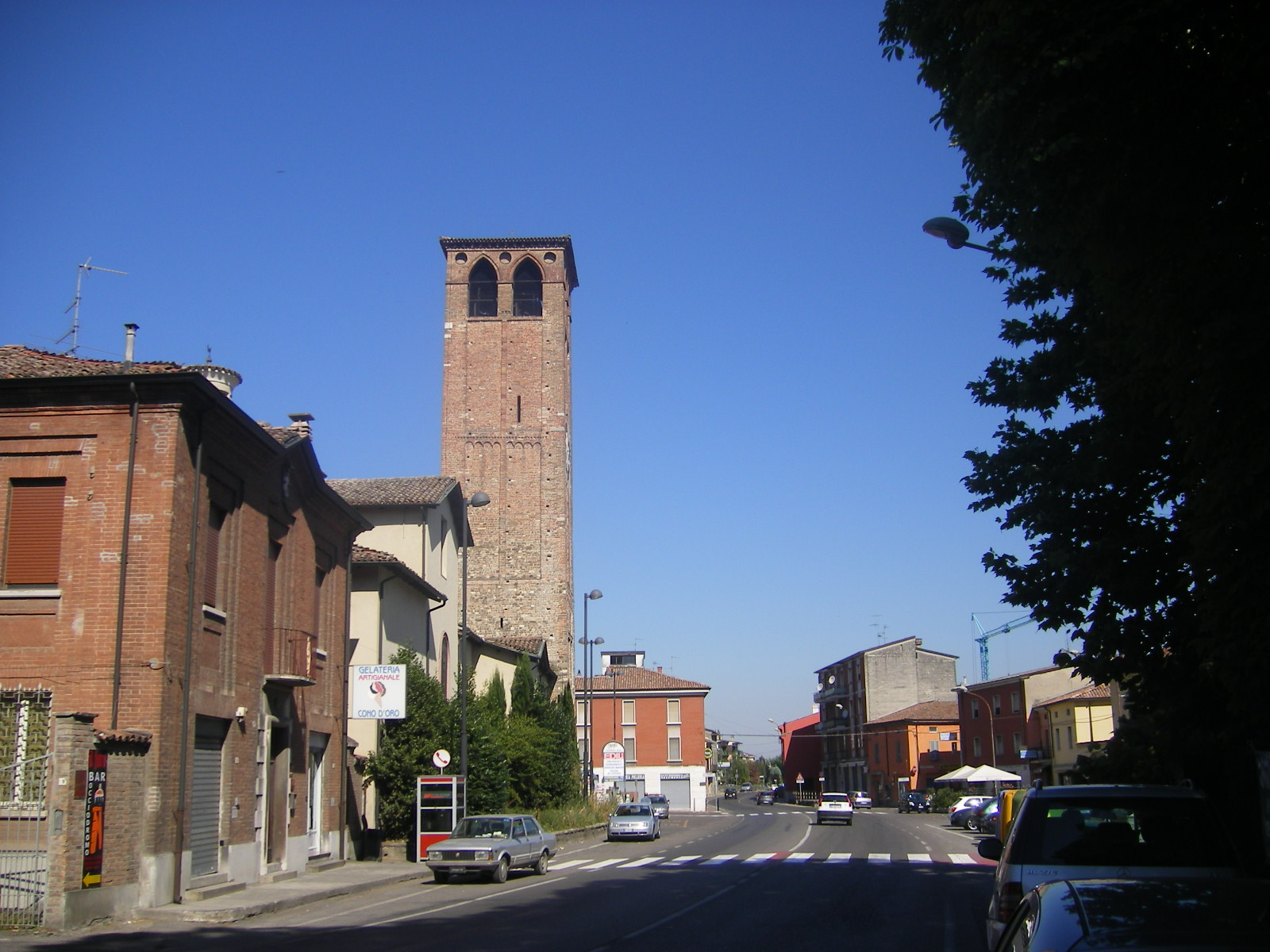

- Location within Italy Location within Emilia-Romagna
- Coordinates: 45°0′N 9°47′E
- Country: Italy
- Region: Emilia-Romagna
- Province: Piacenza (PC)
- Frazioni: Muradello, Paderna, Valconasso

Government
  - Mayor: Giuseppe Carini

Area
  - Total: 33.8 km^{2} (13.1 sq mi)
- Elevation: 65 m (213 ft)

Population (30 September 2014)
  - Total: 6,502
  - Density: 192/km^{2} (498/sq mi)
- Demonym: Pontenuresi
- Time zone: UTC+1 (CET)
  - Summer (DST): UTC+2 (CEST)
- Postal code: 29010
- Dialing code: 0523
- Website: Official website

Pontenure (Piacentino: Pontnür [poŋtˈnyːr]) is a comune (municipality) in the Province of Piacenza in the Italian region Emilia-Romagna, located about 140 kilometres (87 mi) northwest of Bologna and about 9 kilometres (6 mi) southeast of Piacenza.

Pontenure borders the following municipalities: Cadeo, Caorso, Carpaneto Piacentino, Cortemaggiore, Piacenza, Podenzano, San Giorgio Piacentino.
