= Gropparello =

- Comune
- Comune di Gropparello
- Location within Italy Location within Emilia-Romagna
- Coordinates: 44°50′N 9°44′E
- Country: Italy
- Region: Emilia-Romagna
- Province: Piacenza (PC)
- Frazioni: Castellana, Groppovisdomo, Gusano, La Valle, Montechino, Costa Mora, Mista, Obolo, Sariano, Veggiola

Government
  - Mayor: Armando Piazza

Area
  - Total: 56.3 km^{2} (21.7 sq mi)
- Elevation: 355 m (1,165 ft)

Population (31 August 2017)
  - Total: 2,285
  - Density: 40.6/km^{2} (105/sq mi)
- Time zone: UTC+1 (CET)
  - Summer (DST): UTC+2 (CEST)
- Postal code: 29025
- Dialing code: 0523
- Website: Official website

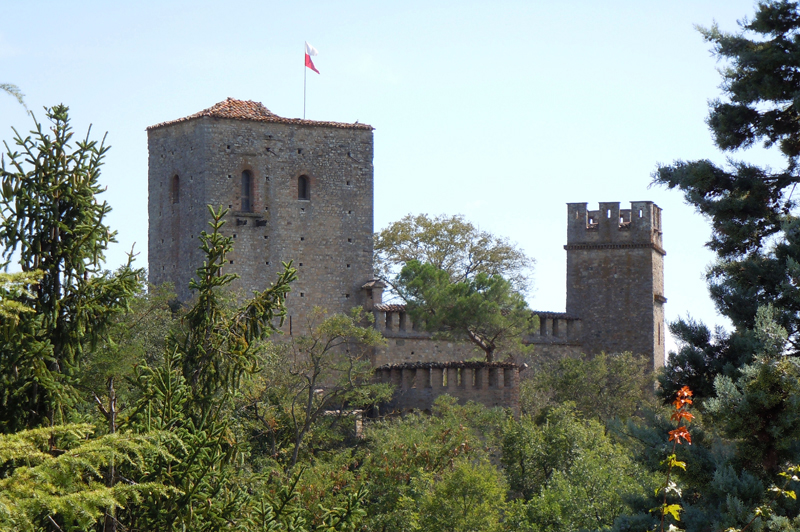
Castle of Gropparello

Gropparello (Piacentino: Gruparél) is a comune (municipality) in the Province of Piacenza in the Italian region Emilia-Romagna, located about 130 kilometres (81 mi) northwest of Bologna and about 25 kilometres (16 mi) south of Piacenza.

The territory of the municipality lies between 175 and 1,099 metres (574 and 3,606 ft) above sea level. The altimetric span is thus 924 metres (3,031 ft).

Gropparello borders the following municipalities: Bettola, Carpaneto Piacentino, Lugagnano Val d'Arda, Morfasso, Ponte dell'Olio, San Giorgio Piacentino.

Sights include the Castle of Montechino.
