= Morfasso =

- Comune
- Comune di Morfasso
- Location within Italy Location within Emilia-Romagna
- Coordinates: 44°43′N 9°42′E
- Country: Italy
- Region: Emilia-Romagna
- Province: Province of Piacenza (PC)
- Frazioni: Rusteghini, Greghi, Casali, Monastero, Pedina, San Michele, Sperongia, Teruzzi

Government
  - Mayor: Paolo Calestani

Area
  - Total: 83.6 km^{2} (32.3 sq mi)
- Elevation: 631 m (2,070 ft)

Population (Dec. 2011)
  - Total: 1,090
  - Density: 13.0/km^{2} (33.8/sq mi)
- Time zone: UTC+1 (CET)
  - Summer (DST): UTC+2 (CEST)
- Postal code: 29020
- Dialing code: 0523
- Website: Official website

Morfasso (Piacentino: Murfàss; locally Murfèss) is a comune (municipality) in the Province of Piacenza in the Italian region Emilia-Romagna, located about 130 kilometres (81 mi) west of Bologna and about 35 kilometres (22 mi) south of Piacenza. As of 31 December 2011, it had a population of 1,090 and an area of 83.6 square kilometres (32.3 mi^{2}).

The municipality of Morfasso contains the frazioni (subdivisions, mainly villages and hamlets) Rusteghini, Greghi, Casali, Monastero, Pedina, San Michele, Sperongia, and Teruzzi.

Morfasso borders the following municipalities: Bardi, Bettola, Bore, Farini, Gropparello, Lugagnano Val d'Arda, Vernasca.

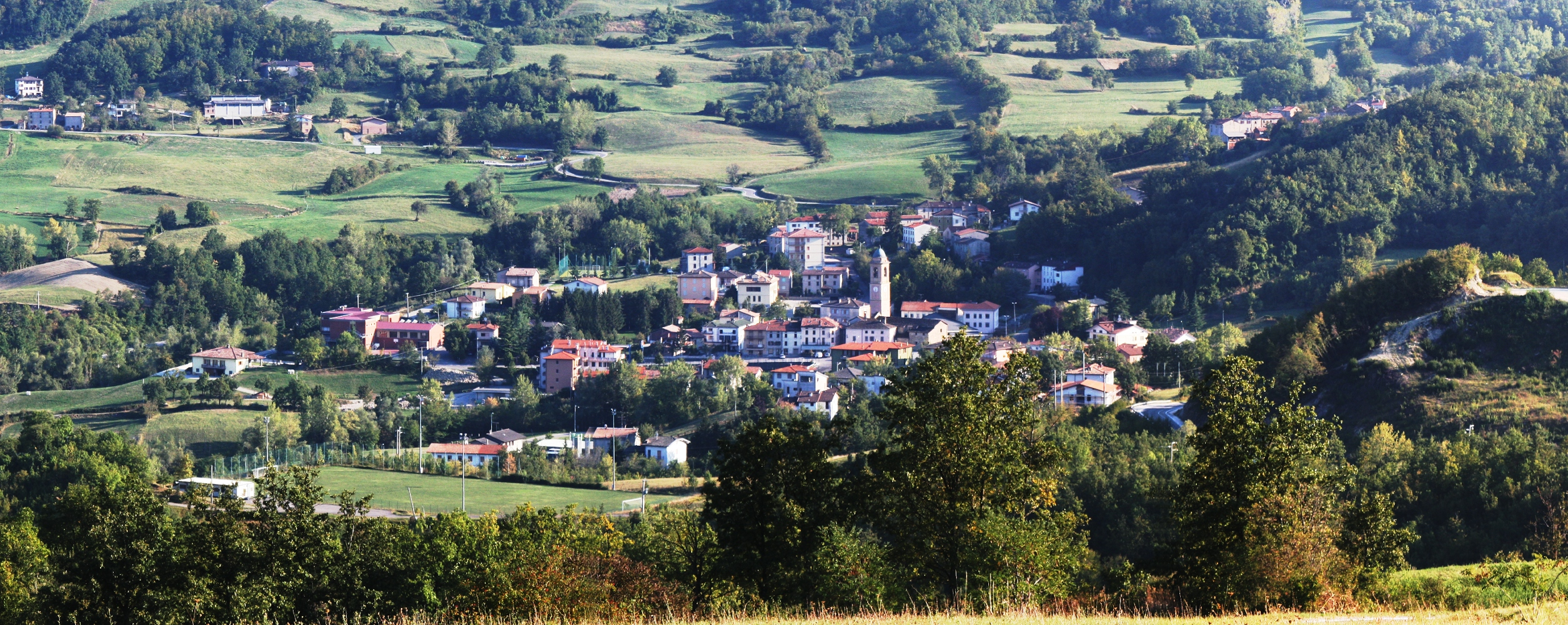
Panorama of Morfasso

== Demographic evolution ==
Historical population

Year	Pop.	±%
1861	4,107	—
1871	4,116	+0.2%
1881	4,342	+5.5%
1901	4,599	+5.9%
1911	5,440	+18.3%

Year	Pop.	±%
1921	5,175	−4.9%
1931	4,531	−12.4%
1936	4,686	+3.4%
1951	4,816	+2.8%
1961	3,730	−22.5%

Year	Pop.	±%
1971	2,599	−30.3%
1981	2,178	−16.2%
1991	1,737	−20.2%
2001	1,371	−21.1%

Source: Data from ISTAT

== See also ==
- Lake Mignano
