= Collegiata of San Fiorenzo, Fiorenzuola d'Arda =

Roman Catholic church in Emilia-Romagna, Italy

Coordinates: 44.9278°N 9.9110°E

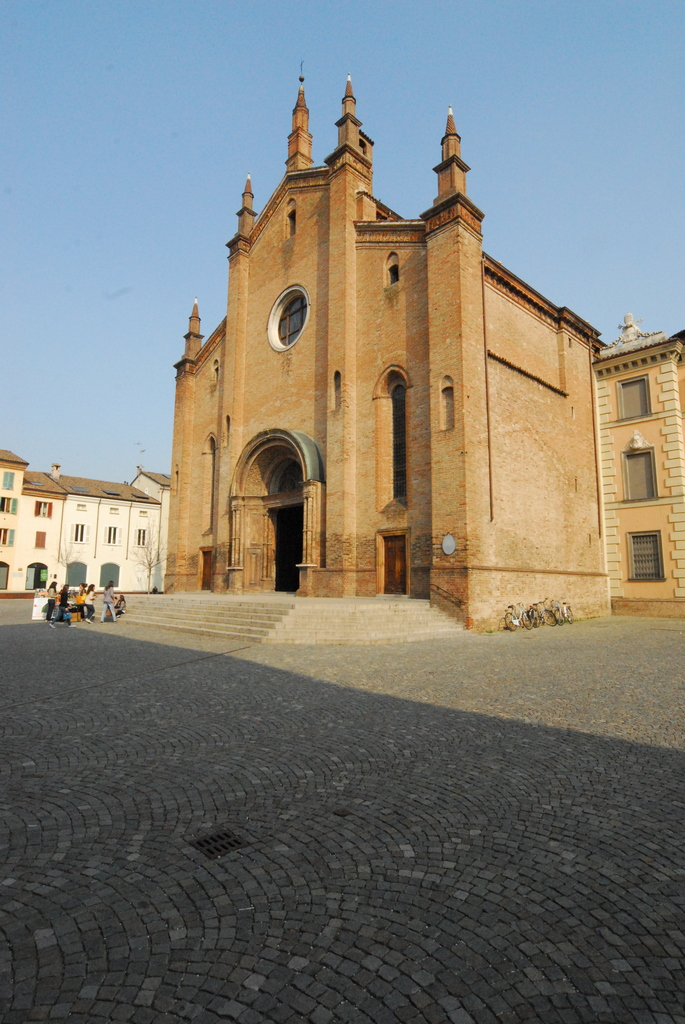
A view of the exterior of the church

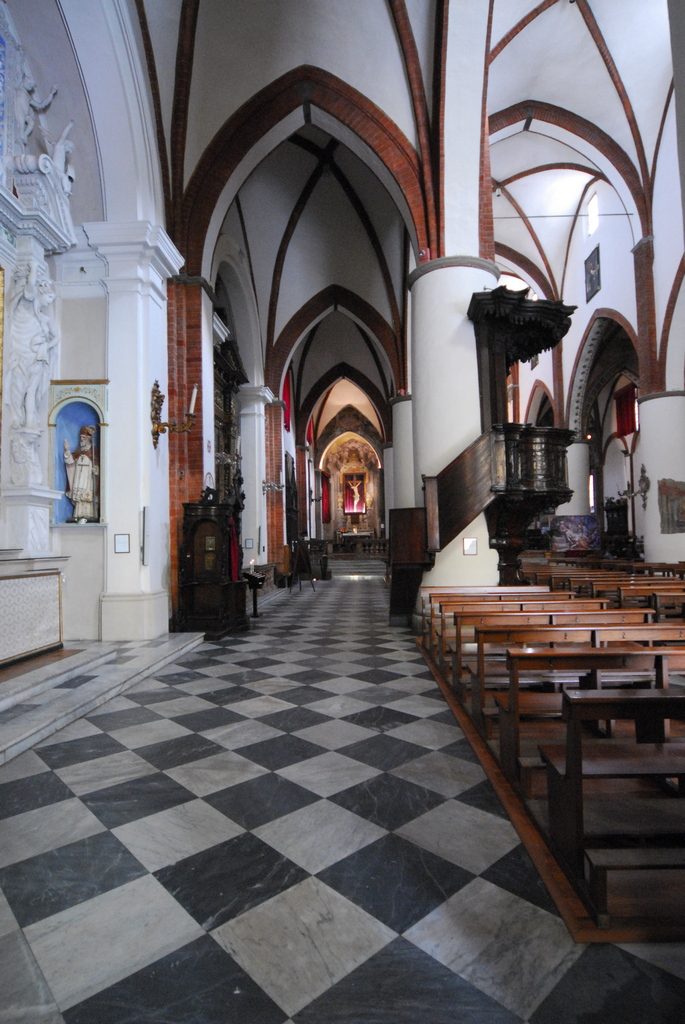
The church's interior

The Collegiate Church of St Florentius (Italian: Collegiata San Fiorenzo) is a Gothic style, Roman Catholic collegiate, now parish church, in Fiorenzuola d'Arda, in the Province of Piacenza, region of Emilia-Romagna, Italy.

== History ==
A church at the site, dedicated to St. Boniface, was present here in 824; later documents note a church dedicated to St. Fiorenzo was rebuilt here in 1273. The Romanesque crypt still maintains an altar dedicated to St Boniface. However construction was not accelerated until 1485. The interior chapel of the Santissimo Sacramento was built in 1685 in Baroque style.

The apse, presbytery, and nave have frescoes mainly focused on the Life of San Fiorenzo by 15th century artists. The stuccoes in the Chapel of the Holy Sacrament were complete by Giacomo Marcori in 1681, and frescoed by Bartolomeo Baderna. It contains a painting depicting the Parable of the Convict (1668) by Jacopo Ferrari, and on the walls two canvases (1674-1675) by Pietro Galli. The 18th-century main altar was designed by Giovanni Paolo Panini and completed by Giovanni Maria Bignetti in 1741. The third altar on the left has a painting depicting the Miracle of San Fiorenzo (1741) by Marco Benefial.

The central pilaster have fragments of frescoes from 1520 and earlier depicting the Madonna. The ciborium dates from the late 11th-century. The organ (1733) built by Giovanni Domenico Traeri was frescoed in the 15th century. The church also has paintings by Giovanni Battista Natali and Antonio Alessandri.

Not far from the church is the Oratory della Buona Morte with an oval cupola.
