= Carpaneto Piacentino =

- Comune
- Comune di Carpaneto Piacentino
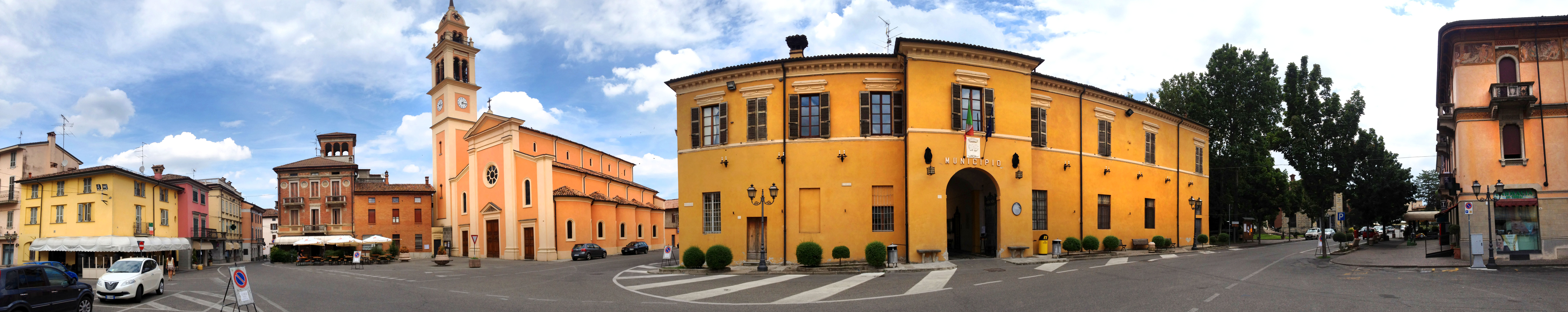

- Coat of arms

- Location within Italy Location within Emilia-Romagna
- Coordinates: 44°55′N 9°47′E
- Country: Italy
- Region: Emilia-Romagna
- Province: Piacenza (PC)
- Frazioni: Zena, Celleri, Ciriano, Chero, Cimafava, Viustino, Travazzano, Badagnano, Rezzano, Magnano, Montanaro

Government
  - Mayor: Andrea Arfani

Area
  - Total: 63.2 km^{2} (24.4 sq mi)
- Elevation: 400 m (1,300 ft)

Population (31 May 2017)
  - Total: 7,740
  - Density: 122/km^{2} (317/sq mi)
- Demonym: Carpanetesi
- Time zone: UTC+1 (CET)
  - Summer (DST): UTC+2 (CEST)
- Postal code: 29013
- Dialing code: 0523
- Website: Official website

Carpaneto Piacentino (Piacentino: Carpané) is a comune (municipality) in the Province of Piacenza in the Italian region of Emilia-Romagna, located about 130 kilometres (81 mi) northwest of Bologna and about 15 kilometres (9 mi) southeast of Piacenza.

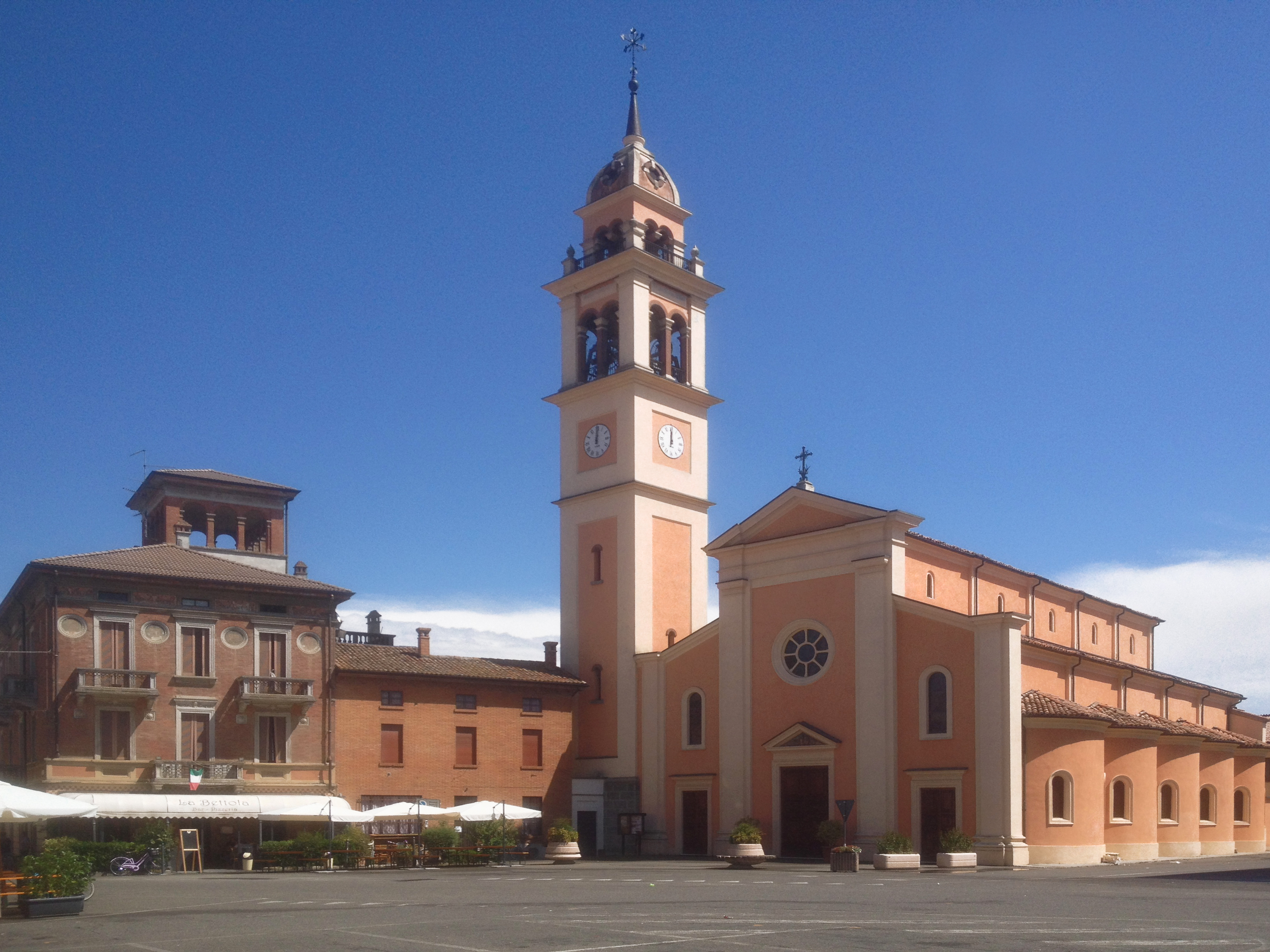
piazza

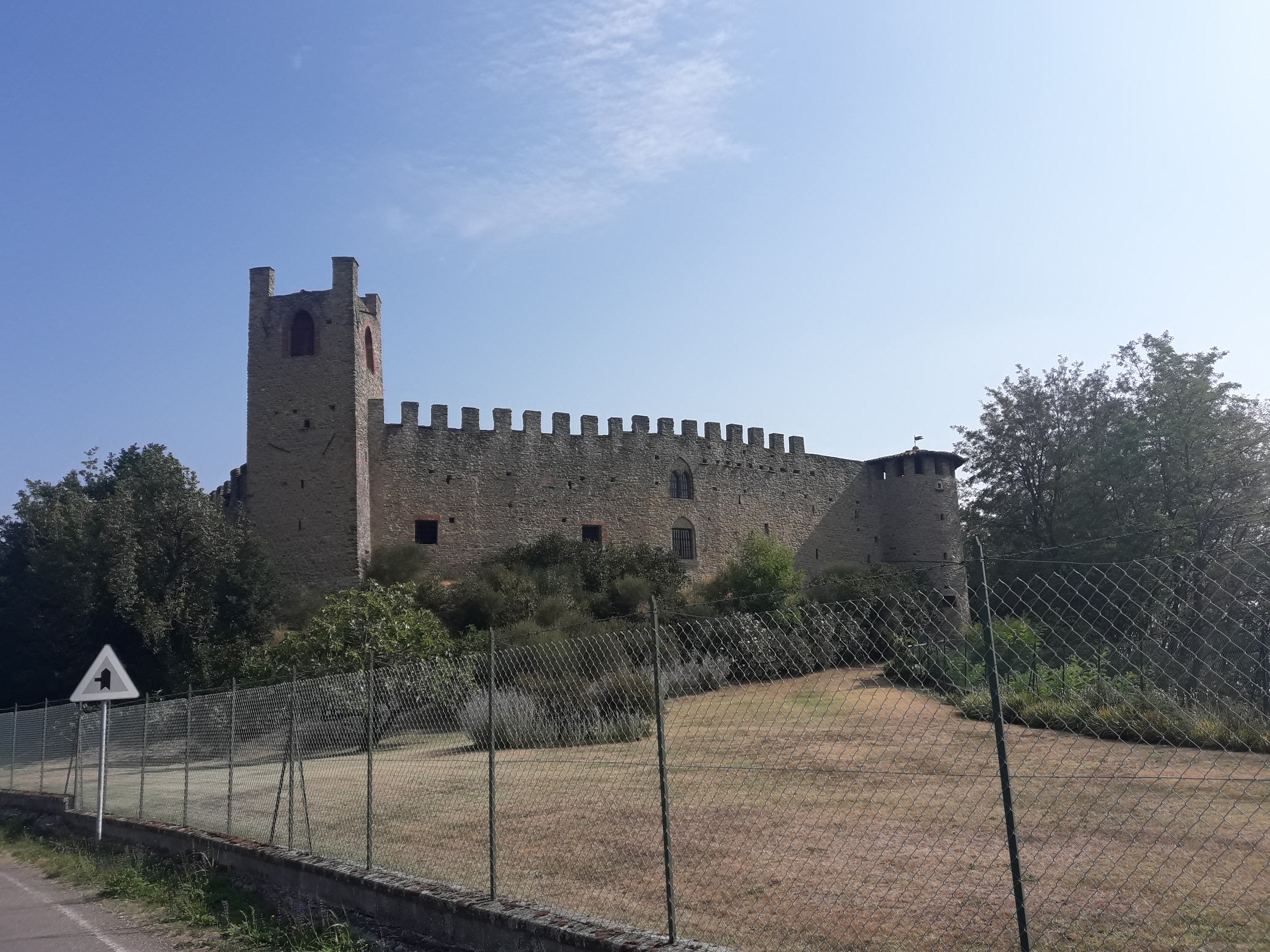
The Castle

Sights include the Badagnano Castle and the Olmeto Castle, both located in the frazione of Badagnano.

Carpaneto Piacentino borders the following municipalities: Cadeo, Castell'Arquato, Fiorenzuola d'Arda, Gropparello, Lugagnano Val d'Arda, Pontenure, San Giorgio Piacentino.
