= Ponte dell'Olio =

- Comune
- Comune di Ponte dell'Olio
- Location within Italy Location within Emilia-Romagna
- Coordinates: 44°52′N 9°38′E
- Country: Italy
- Region: Emilia-Romagna
- Province: Province of Piacenza (PC)
- Frazioni: Folignano, Torrano, Zaffignano, Castione, Sarmata, Monte Santo, Biana, Cassano

Government
  - Mayor: Alessandro Chiesa

Area
  - Total: 44.0 km^{2} (17.0 sq mi)
- Elevation: 217 m (712 ft)

Population (Dec. 2004)
  - Total: 4,917
  - Density: 112/km^{2} (289/sq mi)
- Demonym: Pontolliesi
- Time zone: UTC+1 (CET)
  - Summer (DST): UTC+2 (CEST)
- Postal code: 29028
- Dialing code: 0523
- Website: Official website

Ponte dell'Olio (Piacentino: Al Pont da l'Oli [ɐl ˈpoŋt dɐ ˈlɔli]) is a comune (municipality) in the province of Piacenza, in the Italian region of Emilia-Romagna, located about 22 kilometres (14 mi) south of Piacenza, about 85 kilometres (53 mi) south of Milan and about 160 kilometres (99 mi) northwest of Bologna. As of 31 December 2004, it had a population of 4,917 and an area of 44.0 square kilometres (17.0 mi^{2}).

Among the sites is the Castello di Riva located next to the river Nure. The castle is privately owned and undergoing restoration.

The municipality of Ponte dell'Olio contains the frazioni (subdivisions, mainly villages and hamlets) Folignano, Torrano, Zaffignano, Castione, Sarmata, Monte Santo, Biana, and Cassano.

Ponte dell'Olio borders the following municipalities: Bettola, Gropparello, San Giorgio Piacentino, Vigolzone.

== Demographic evolution ==
Historical population

Year	Pop.	±%
1861	3,656	—
1871	3,938	+7.7%
1881	4,200	+6.7%
1901	4,521	+7.6%
1911	5,036	+11.4%

Year	Pop.	±%
1921	5,583	+10.9%
1931	5,982	+7.1%
1936	6,019	+0.6%
1951	6,098	+1.3%
1961	5,441	−10.8%

Year	Pop.	±%
1971	5,011	−7.9%
1981	4,937	−1.5%
1991	4,827	−2.2%
2001	4,823	−0.1%

Source: Data from ISTAT

== Notable people ==
- Mara Romero Borella (born 1986), mixed martial artist
- Marco Andreolli (born 1986), Italian professional footballer
