= Cortemaggiore =

- Comune
- Comune di Cortemaggiore
- Coat of arms
- Motto: "Nihil sanctius quam recta fides cum sororibus associata" (Nothing is holier than a true faith combined with other virtues)
- Location within Italy Location within Emilia-Romagna
- Coordinates: 45°0′N 9°56′E
- Country: Italy
- Region: Emilia-Romagna
- Province: Province of Piacenza (PC)
- Frazioni: Chiavenna Landi and San Martino in Olza

Government
  - Mayor: Luigi Merli

Area
  - Total: 36 km^{2} (14 sq mi)
- Elevation: 50 m (160 ft)

Population (2018-01-01)
  - Total: 4,345
  - Density: 120/km^{2} (310/sq mi)
- Demonym: Cortemaggioresi or Magiostrini
- Time zone: UTC+1 (CET)
  - Summer (DST): UTC+2 (CEST)
- Postal code: 29016
- Dialing code: 0523
- Patron saint: San Lorenzo (St. Lawrence)
- Saint day: August 10
- Website: Official website

Cortemaggiore (Piacentino: Curtmagiùr) is an Italian comune (municipality) located in the Province of Piacenza. Cortemaggiore is located in northern Italy about 80 kilometres (50 mi) from Milan and 120 kilometres (75 mi) from Bologna, in the Po Valley. The municipality borders Fiorenzuola d'Arda, Villanova sull'Arda, Besenzone, San Pietro in Cerro, Caorso, Pontenure and Cadeo.

The town was founded in 1479 by the Pallavicini family, over an old Roman habitation, which had been the capital of the ancient Stato Pallavicino. In 1949 the Italian entrepreneur Enrico Mattei discovered in Cortemaggiore's subsoil an important oilfield; with this oil a gasoline called Supercortemaggiore was produced, the only one refined from Italian oil.

The municipality's motto is Nihil sanctius quam recta fides cum sororibus associata - "Nothing is holier than a true faith combined with other virtues."

== Architecture ==
Among the religious edifices in the town are the following:

- Basilica of Santa Maria delle Grazie or Collegiata: Gothic style church in town center. The interior conserves a polyptych, composed of twelve pieces by Filippo Mazzola, the father of Parmigianino.
- San Giovanni: church built in 1625-1630 and frescoed by Robert de Longe in 1705
- Annunziata: church and adjacent Franciscan monastery, built in 1487, it houses two works by Il Pordenone, an Immaculate Conception and a Deposition from the Cross.
- San Giuseppe: built 1576-1593 by the brotherhood of San Giuseppe, and subsequently decorated with stuccoes by Bernardo Barca and Domenico Dossi in 1697-1701
- Oratory of San Lorenzo: built in 1666.
- Oratory of San Giovanni: started in 1625 by the confraternity of SS Sacramento.
- Santa Maria delle Grazie fuori le mura or Madonnina: built by the priest Anotonio Bovarini in 1661.

== Notable people born in Cortemaggiore ==
- Ranuccio II Farnese (1630–94), Duke of Parma and Piacenza
- Lorenzo Respighi (1824–89), mathematician, astronomer
- Giuseppe Manfredi (1828–1918), patriot and President of the Italian Senate from 1908 to 1918, during the years of World War I
- Franco Fabrizi (1926–95), actor

== Image gallery ==
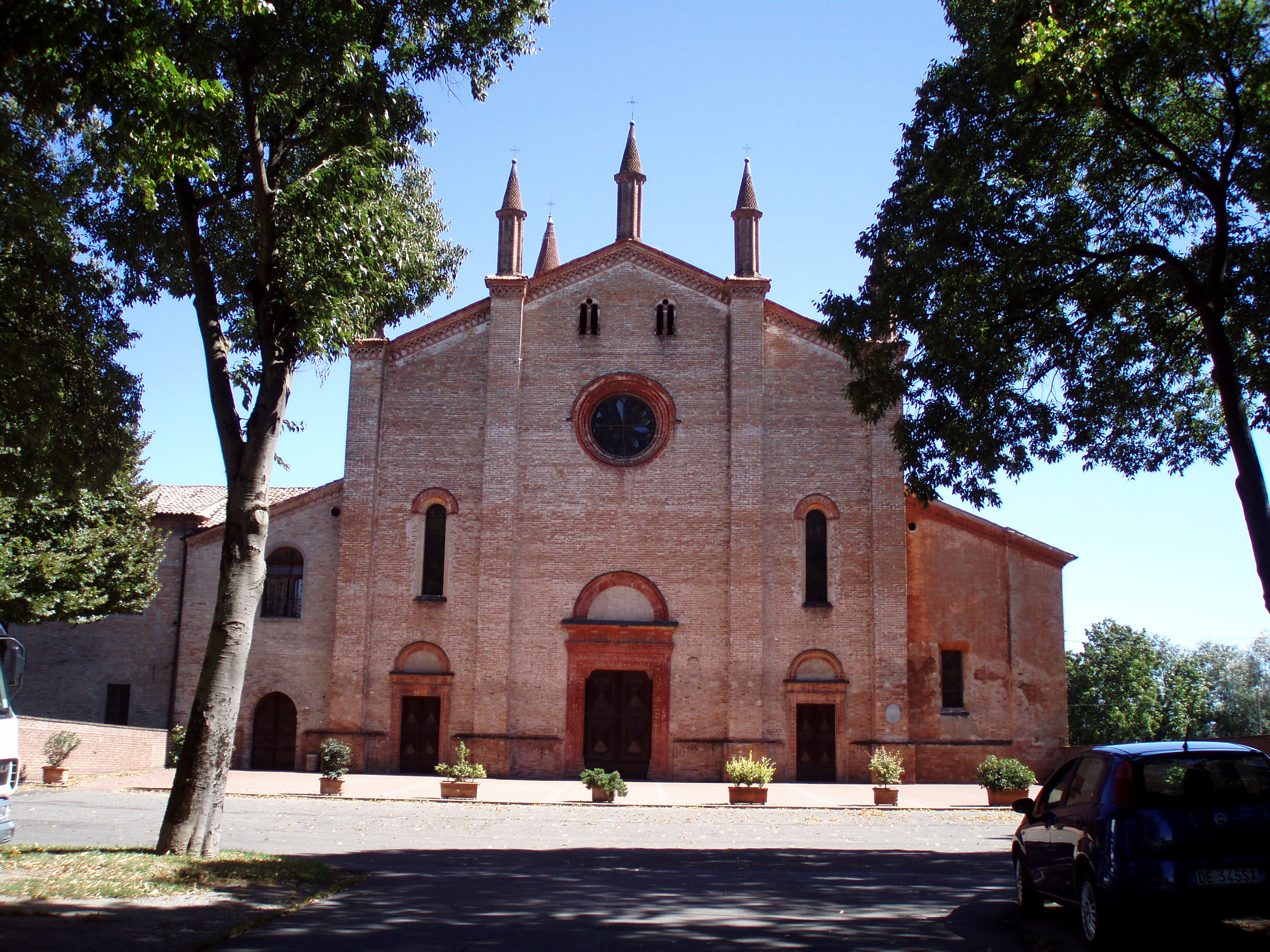
The façade of the Church "dell'Annunziata".

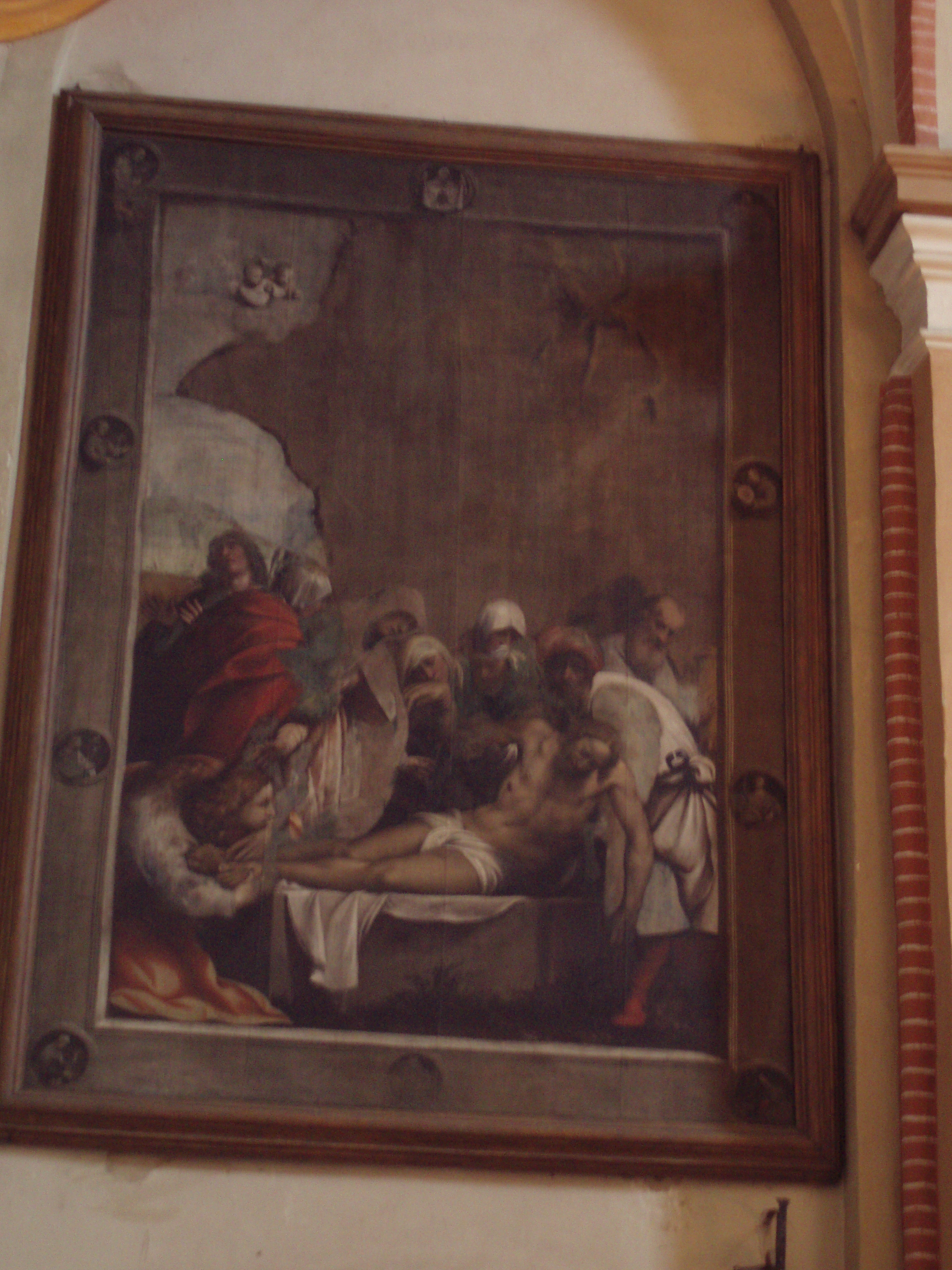
"The Deposition", by Il Pordenone.

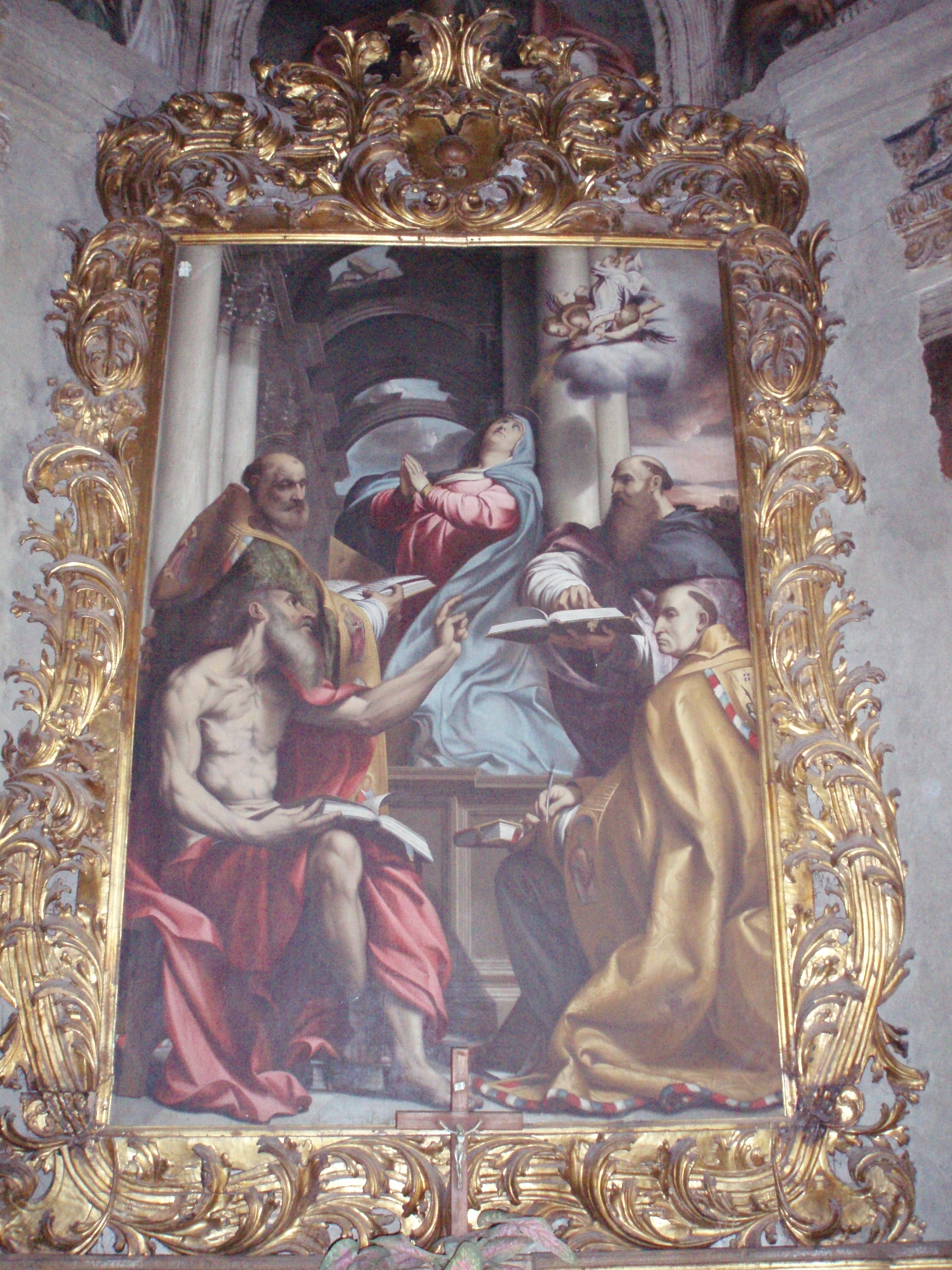
"The Blameless Conception", by Pordenone.

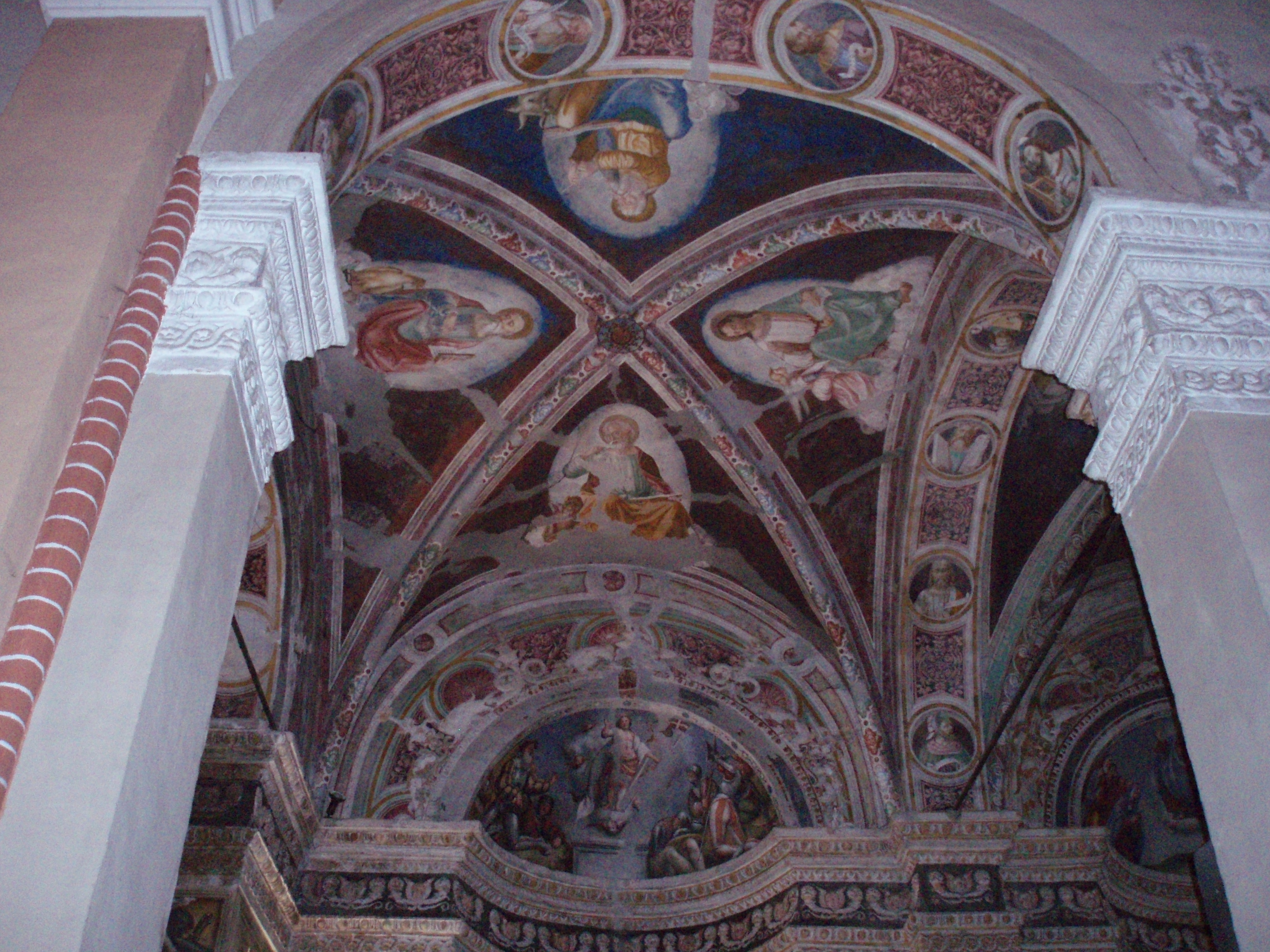
A view of the Pallavicino's private chapel in the church "dell'Annunziata".

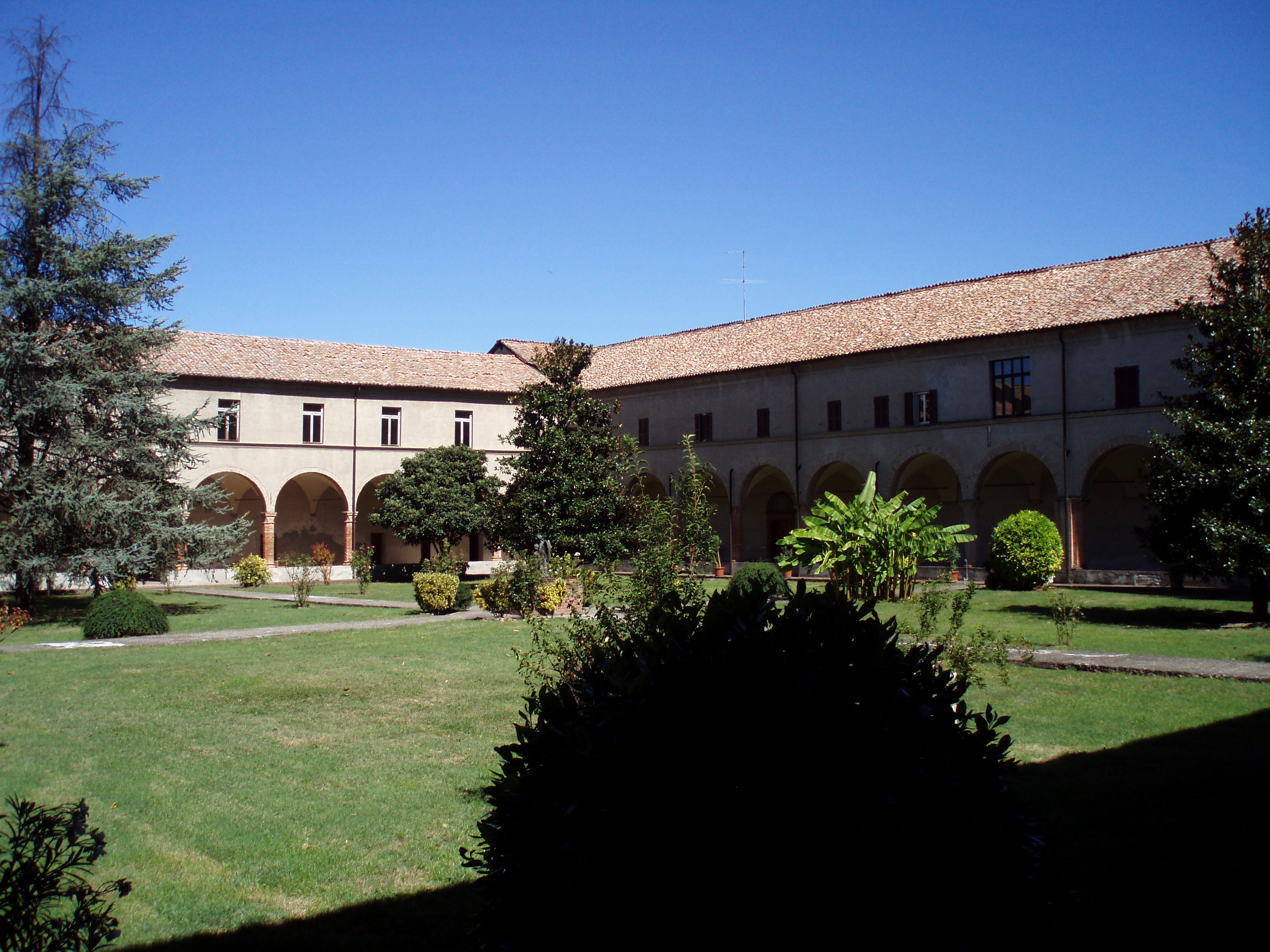
The beautiful cloister of the church "dell'Annunziata".

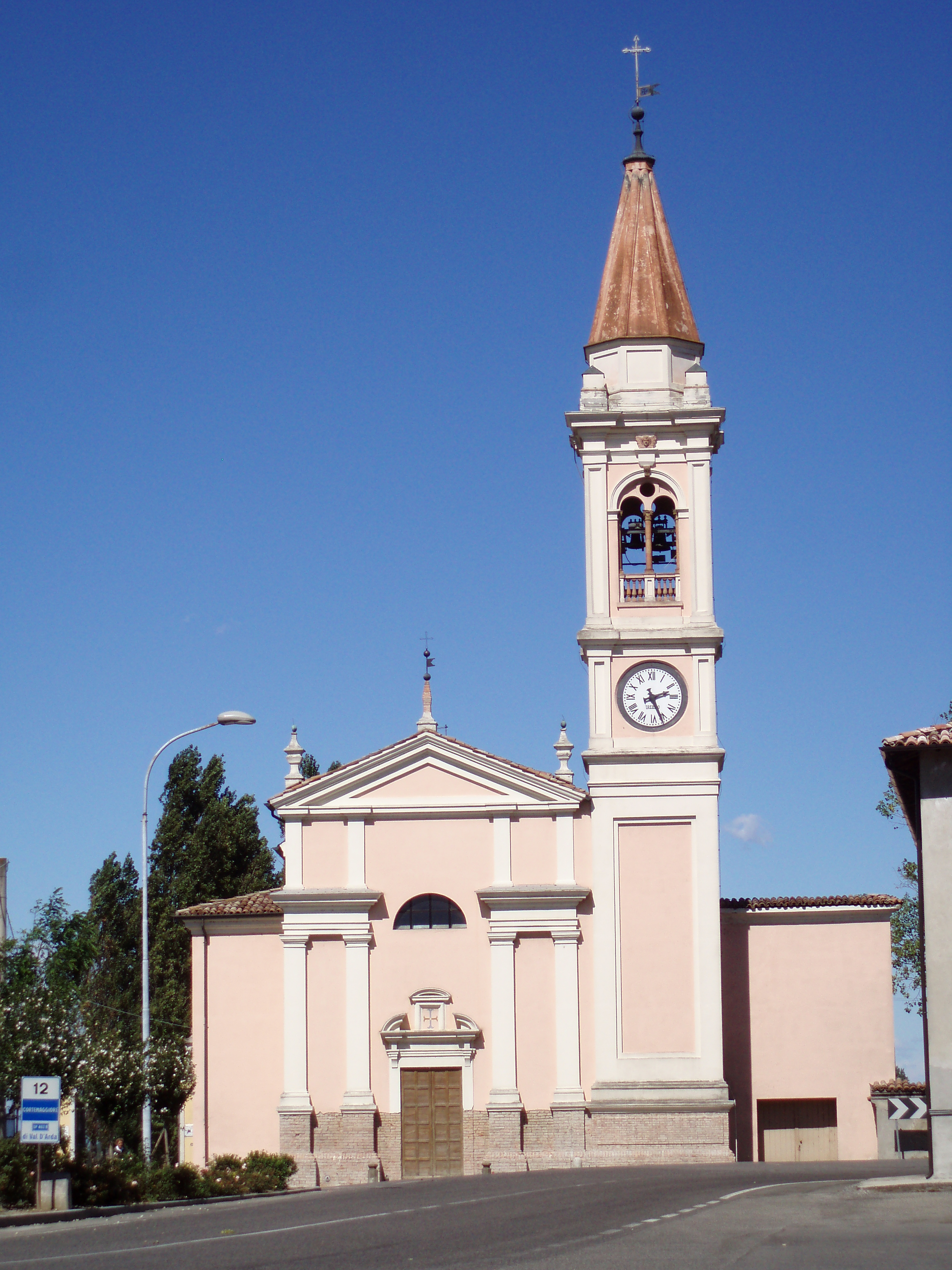
The church "Santa Maria delle Grazie fuori la mura" or "Madonnina".

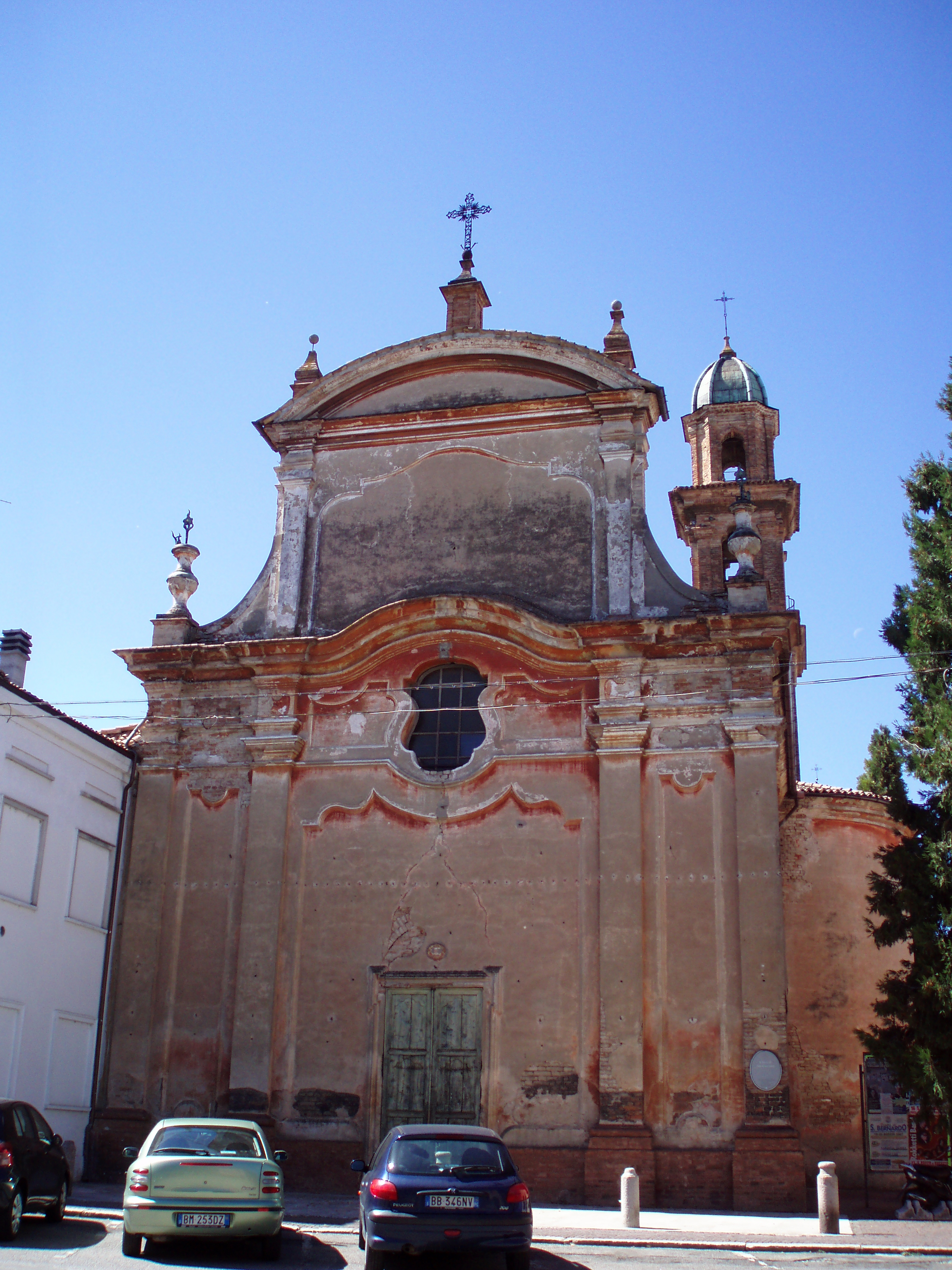
The oratory of "San Giovanni" (St. John).

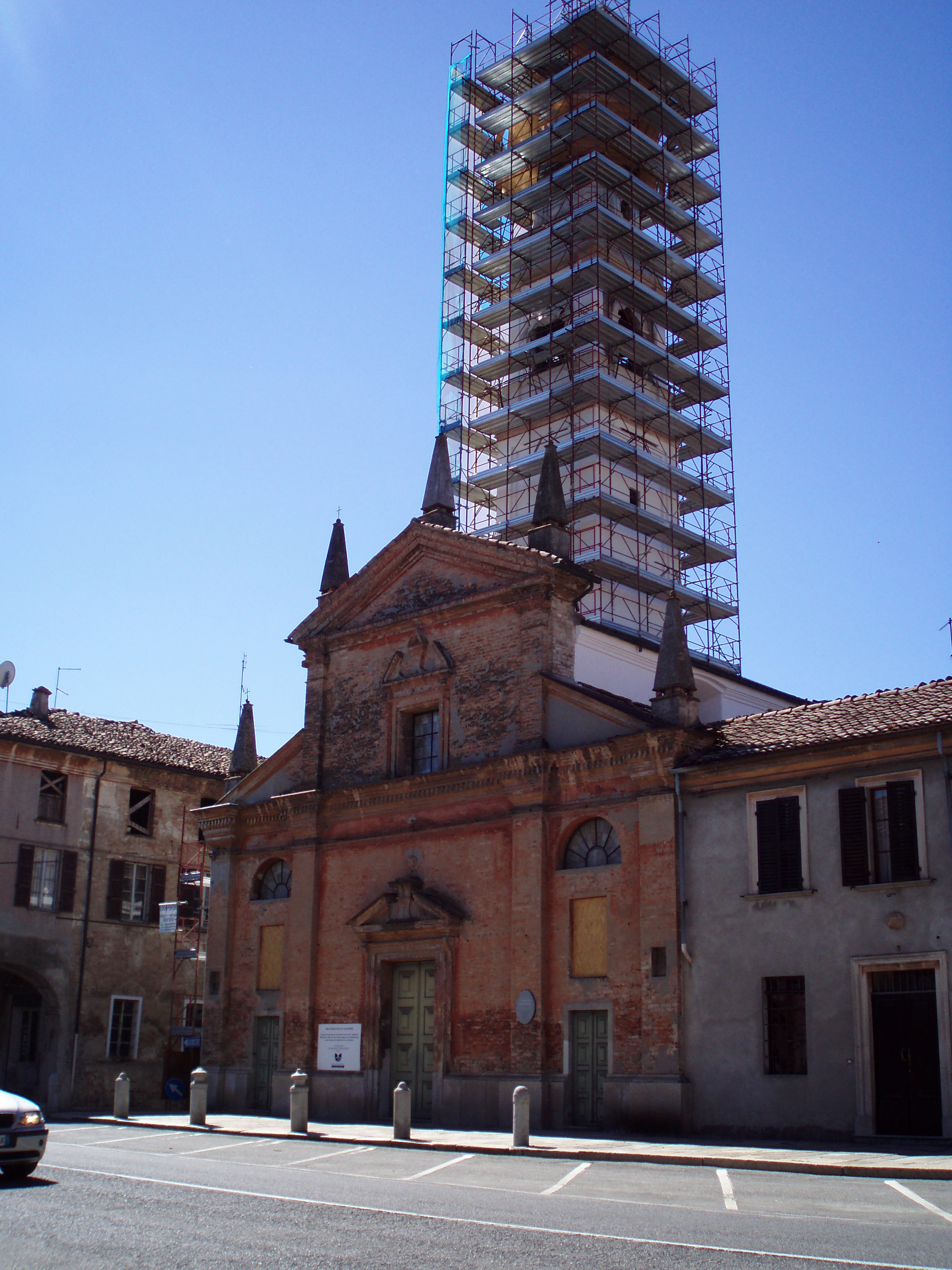
The church of "San Giuseppe" (St. Joseph).

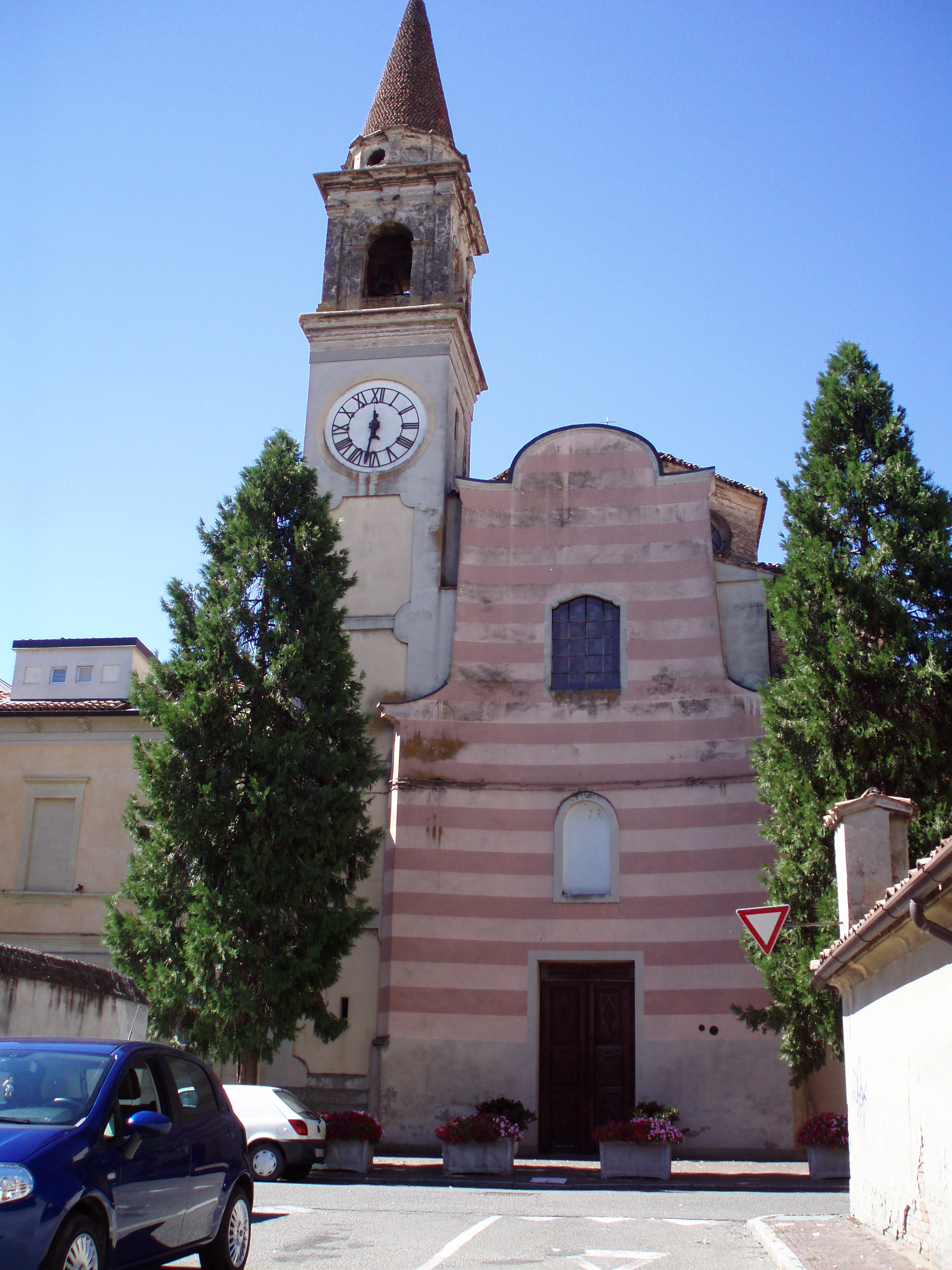
The Oratory of "San Lorenzo" (St. Lawrence).

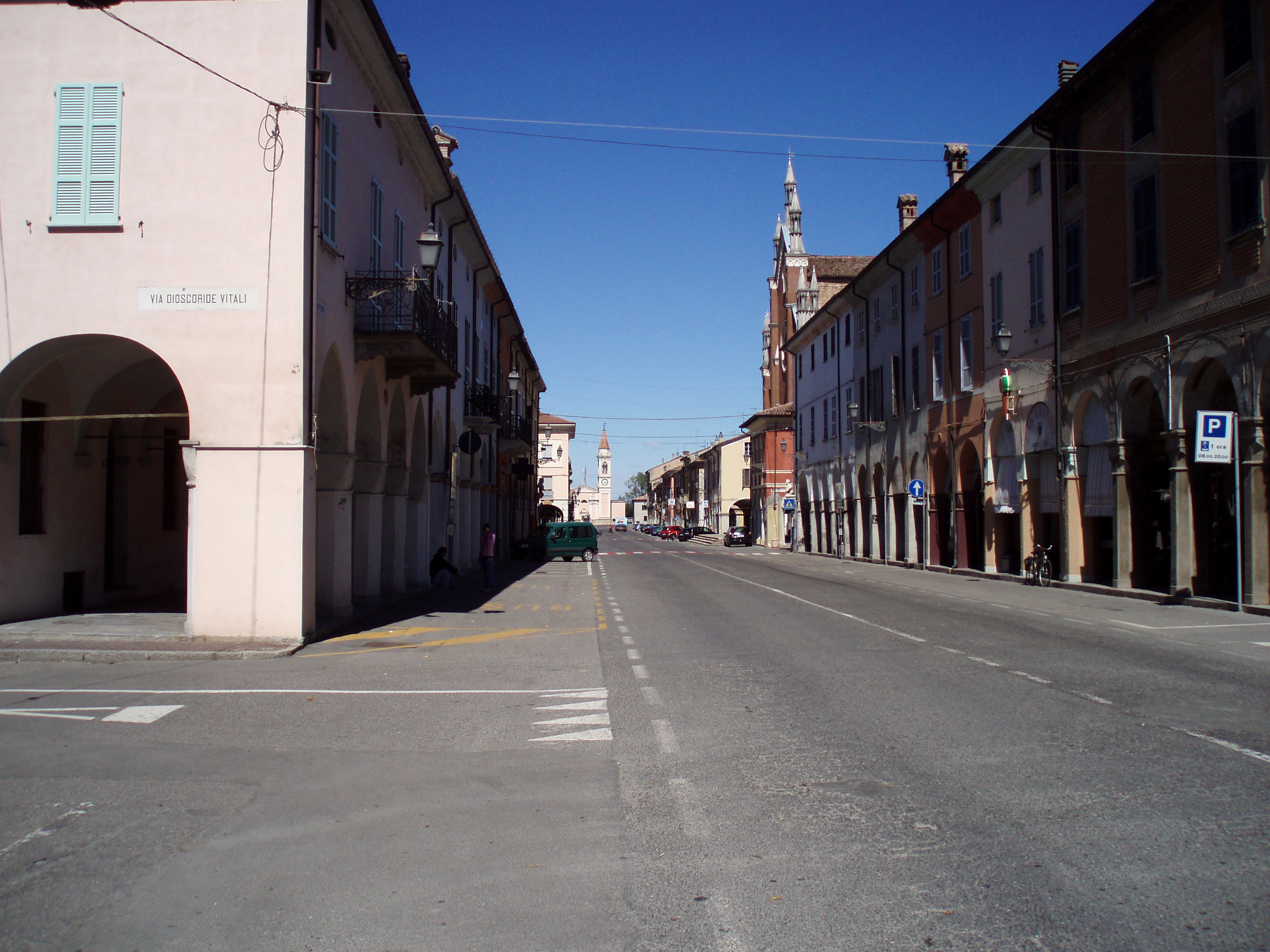
A view of Cortemaggiore's centre.
