= Lugagnano Val d'Arda =

- Comune
- Comune di Lugagnano Val d'Arda
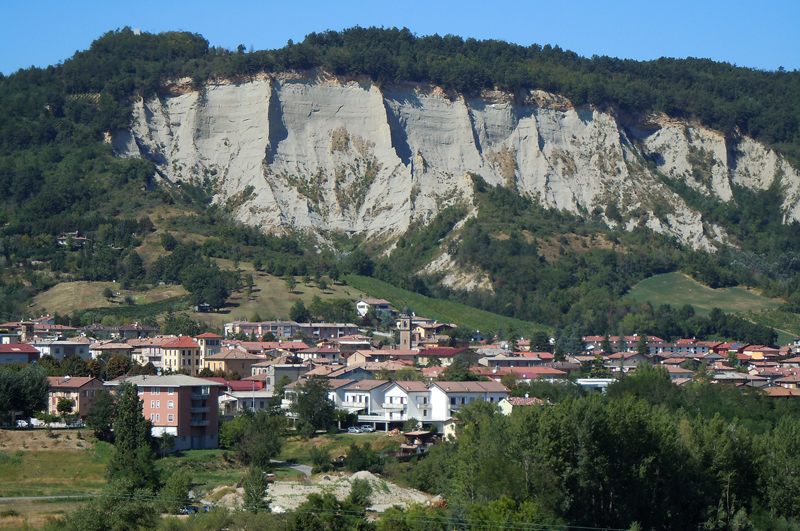

- Location within Italy Location within Emilia-Romagna
- Coordinates: 44°49′N 9°49′E
- Country: Italy
- Region: Emilia-Romagna
- Province: Piacenza (PC)
- Frazioni: Antognano, Chiavenna Rocchetta, Diolo, Montezago, Prato Ottesola, Rustigazzo, Tabiano, Velleia, Vicanino

Government
  - Mayor: Antonio Vincini

Area
  - Total: 54.4 km^{2} (21.0 sq mi)
- Elevation: 229 m (751 ft)

Population (30 September 2017)
  - Total: 3,997
  - Density: 73.5/km^{2} (190/sq mi)
- Demonym: Lugagnanesi
- Time zone: UTC+1 (CET)
  - Summer (DST): UTC+2 (CEST)
- Postal code: 29018
- Dialing code: 0523
- Website: Official website

Lugagnano Val d'Arda (Piacentino: Lügagnan) is a comune (municipality) in the Province of Piacenza in the Italian region Emilia-Romagna.

== Geography ==
It's located about 130 kilometres (81 mi) northwest of Bologna and about 30 kilometres (19 mi) southeast of Piacenza, on the Arda stream.

Lugagnano Val d'Arda borders the following municipalities: Carpaneto Piacentino, Castell'Arquato, Gropparello, Morfasso, Vernasca.
