= Podenzano =

- Comune
- Comune di Podenzano
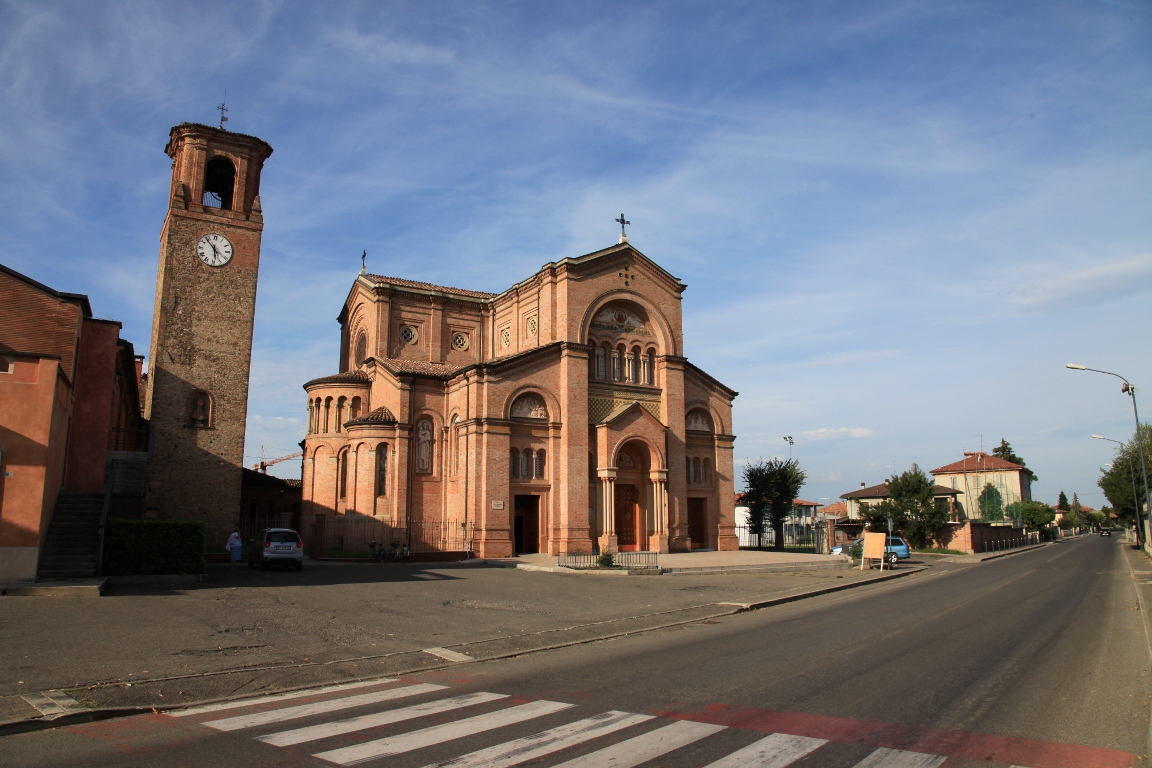
- Church of San Germano

- Location within Italy Location within Emilia-Romagna
- Coordinates: 44°57′N 9°41′E
- Country: Italy
- Region: Emilia-Romagna
- Province: Piacenza (PC)
- Frazioni: Gariga, San Polo, Turro, Albone, Altoè, Verano, Maiano, Casoni

Government
  - Mayor: Riccardo Sparzagni

Area
  - Total: 44.58 km^{2} (17.21 sq mi)
- Elevation: 118 m (387 ft)

Population (30 September 2017)
  - Total: 9,156
  - Density: 205.4/km^{2} (531.9/sq mi)
- Demonym: Podenzanesi
- Time zone: UTC+1 (CET)
  - Summer (DST): UTC+2 (CEST)
- Postal code: 29027
- Dialing code: 0523
- Patron saint: St. San Giovanni Bosco & St. Germano
- Saint day: January 31
- Website: Official website

Podenzano (Piacentino: Pudinsàn [pudiŋˈsaŋ]) is a comune in the Province of Piacenza, Emilia-Romagna, northern Italy.

It is bordered by the following municipalities: Gossolengo, Piacenza, Pontenure, Rivergaro, San Giorgio Piacentino, Vigolzone.

The patron saint is San Giovanni Bosco. The main parish church is San Germano e San Giovanni Bosco.

== Twin towns ==
Podenzano is twinned with:

- Hajdúdorog, Hungary
- Kanibonzon, Mali

== See also ==
- San Polo, Podenzano
