= Bettola =

- Comune
- Comune di Bettola
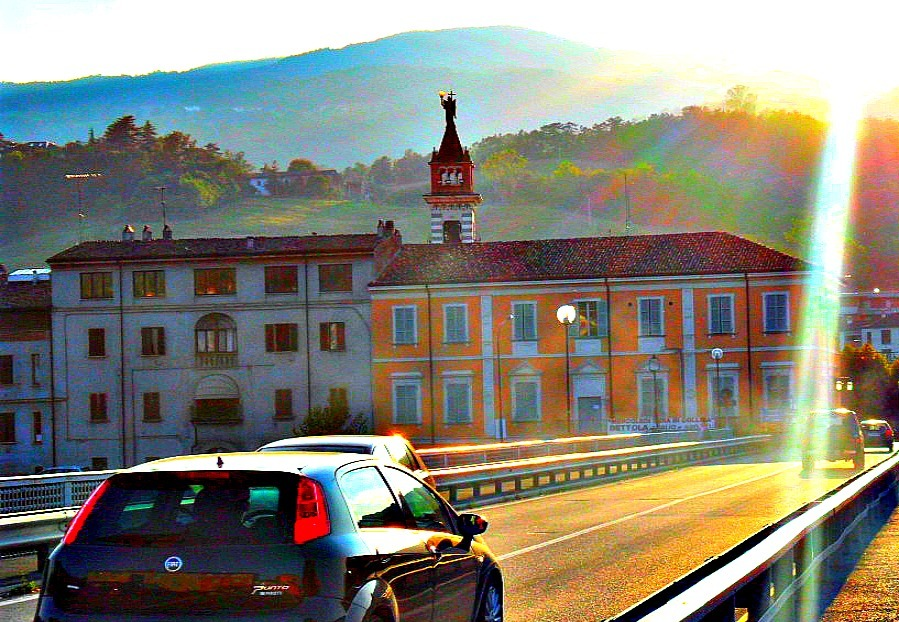
- The town of Bettola

- Coat of arms

- Location within Italy Location within Emilia-Romagna
- Coordinates: 44°47′N 9°37′E
- Country: Italy
- Region: Emilia-Romagna
- Province: Piacenza (PC)
- Frazioni: Bramaiano, Calenzano, Case Albegato, Ebbio, Groppo Ducale, Leggio, Missano, Olmo, Padri, Pradello, Recesio, Revigozzo, Rigolo, Roncovero, Rossoreggio, Spettine, Teglio, Vigolo, Villanova, Piacensa

Government
  - Mayor: Paolo Negri

Area
  - Total: 122.37 km^{2} (47.25 sq mi)
- Elevation: 329 m (1,079 ft)

Population (28 February 2017)
  - Total: 2,763
  - Density: 22.58/km^{2} (58.48/sq mi)
- Demonym: Bettolesi
- Time zone: UTC+1 (CET)
  - Summer (DST): UTC+2 (CEST)
- Postal code: 29021
- Dialing code: 0523
- Website: Official website

Bettola (Piacentino: La Bëtla [lɐ ˈbətlɐ] or Bétula [ˈbetulɐ]) is a comune (municipality) in the Province of Piacenza in the Italian region Emilia-Romagna, located about 140 kilometres (87 mi) west of Bologna and about 30 kilometres (19 mi) south of Piacenza.

== People ==
France's last recognised World War I veteran, Lazare Ponticelli, was born here before moving to Paris at nine years of age.

The former leader of the Italian Democratic Party, Pier Luigi Bersani, was born here in 1951.
