= Fiorenzuola d'Arda =

- Comune
- Comune di Fiorenzuola d'Arda
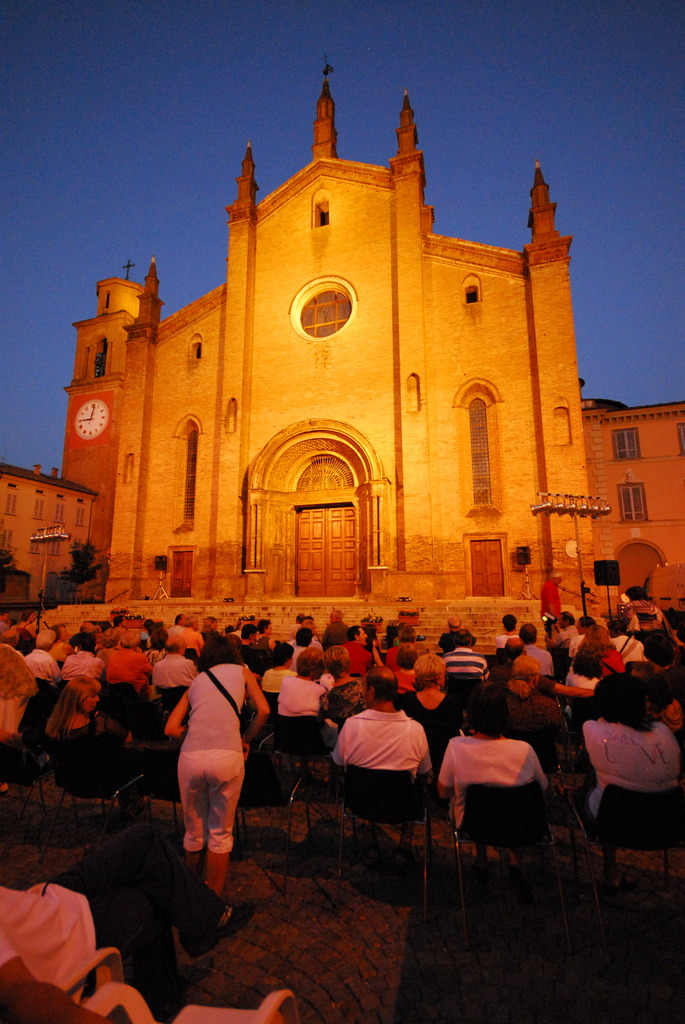
- The Collegiata of San Fiorenzo.

- Coat of arms

- Location within Italy Location within Emilia-Romagna
- Coordinates: 44°56′N 9°54′E
- Country: Italy
- Region: Emilia-Romagna
- Province: Piacenza (PC)
- Frazioni: Baselica Duce, San Protaso, Paullo

Government
  - Mayor: Romeo Gandolfi

Area
  - Total: 59 km^{2} (23 sq mi)
- Elevation: 82 m (269 ft)

Population (31 August 2017)
  - Total: 15,313
  - Density: 260/km^{2} (670/sq mi)
- Demonym: Fiorenzuolani
- Time zone: UTC+1 (CET)
  - Summer (DST): UTC+2 (CEST)
- Postal code: 29017
- Dialing code: 0523
- Patron saint: San Fiorenzo
- Saint day: 17 October
- Website: Official website

Fiorenzuola d'Arda (Italian pronunciation: [fjorenˈtswɔːla ˈdarda]; Piacentino: Fiurinsöla, IPA: [fi.uriŋˈsøːlɐ] or [fi.uriŋˈsoːlɐ]) is a city and comune in Italy in the province of Piacenza, part of the Emilia-Romagna region. Its name derives from Florentia ("prosperous" in Latin). The "d'Arda" portion refers to the River Arda which flows from the Apennines into the valley where Fiorenzuola is situated. Fiorenzuola's origins are old, dating from the first prehistorical human settlements in Italy.

== History ==
Fiorenzuola d'Arda was one of the main centers of the area during the Middle Ages. Under the Duchy of Parma and Piacenza it was a "middle county" independent from both parties.

== Main sights ==
- Collegiata of San Fiorenzo, built in the 14th century and remade in the late 15th/early 16th centuries. It was built above the preexisting church of Saint Bonifacio.
- Church of Beata Vergine di Caravaggio
- Oratory of Beata Vergine
- Verdi Theater
- Church of St. Francis

== Sport ==
The town is represented by Serie C football club US Fiorenzuola. The annual Six Days of Fiorenzuola, a six-day track cycling race, has taken place in Fiorenzuola since 1998.

== Twin towns ==
- Camagüey, Cuba
- Zenica, Bosnia and Herzegovina
- Laussonne, France
