= Sant'Ignazio, Busseto =

Italian church

Coordinates: 44°58′45″N 10°02′29″E

Sant'Ignazio is a Baroque architecture-style Roman Catholic church, located in Busseto, region of Emilia-Romagna, Italy.

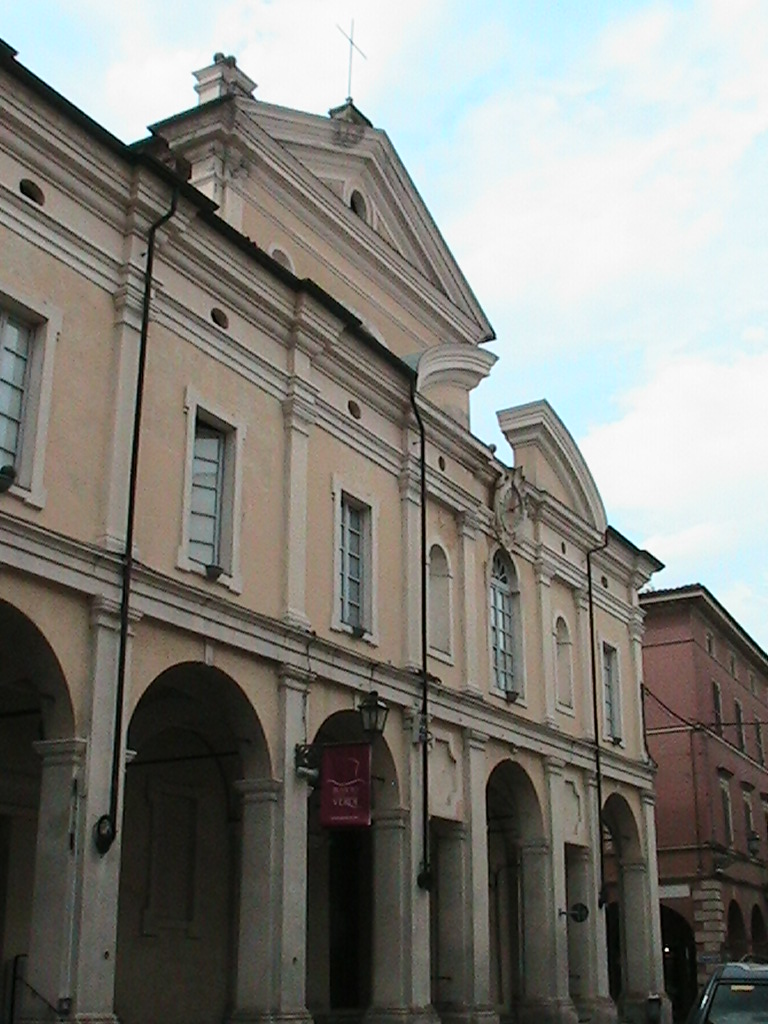
Facade of church.

== History ==
In 1617 Pietro Pettorelli founded the College of the Jesuits in Busseto, building a church that was only completed by 1862.

The facade has a broken anterior pediment above the entrance, a Baroque finish to an otherwise sober front, in measured doric pilasters. The interior, in Baroque style, has a single nave with three chapels on each side and was entirely stuccoed and painted by Domenico Dossa and Bernardo Barca.

The frescoes, attributed to Giovanni Evangelista Draghi, depict the Glory of the Saints Ignatius, Luigi Gonzaga, Francis Xavier, and Francesco Borgia. The same artist also completed six oil paintings on canvas in stucco frames, which loom over the statues of some Jesuit saints, and contain episodes from the life of the founder of the Jesuits: the conversion of St Ignatius in the castle of Loyola, the holy penitent in Montserrat, his ascetic life at Manresa, his trip to the Holy Land, his apostleship, and his miracles.

Four of the side chapels are frescoed in trompe-l'œil, attributed to Giuseppe Natali, while the wooden altarpieces are by Vincenzo Biazzi. Among the other paintings, in part preserved in the Collegiate Church of San Bartolomeo, are a San Giovanni Francesco de' Regis by Clemente Ruta, The Arrival of St Francis Xavier in the Indies by Draghi.

The main altar-piece depicts The Glory of St Ignatius by Pier Ilario Spolverini, copied by Giacinto Brandi. The Jesuits were expelled from the Duchy of Parma and Piacenza by Ferdinand, Duke of Parma, by decree of 3 February 1768, validated by Pope Clement XIV with a papal bull in 1773. The college was then used as a hospital and also housed the public schools attended by Giuseppe Verdi.
