= Draghi =

Draghi is an Italian surname (from the plural of drago, "dragon") and may refer to:

- Antonio Draghi (1634–1700), Italian composer
- Giovanni Battista Draghi (composer) (1640–1708), Anglo-Italian composer
- Giovanni Evangelista Draghi (1657–1712), Italian painter
- Mario Draghi (born 1947), Italian economist and president of the European Central Bank (2011–2019), Prime Minister of Italy (2021–2022)
