= San Paolo, Piacenza =

Church in Piacenza, Italy

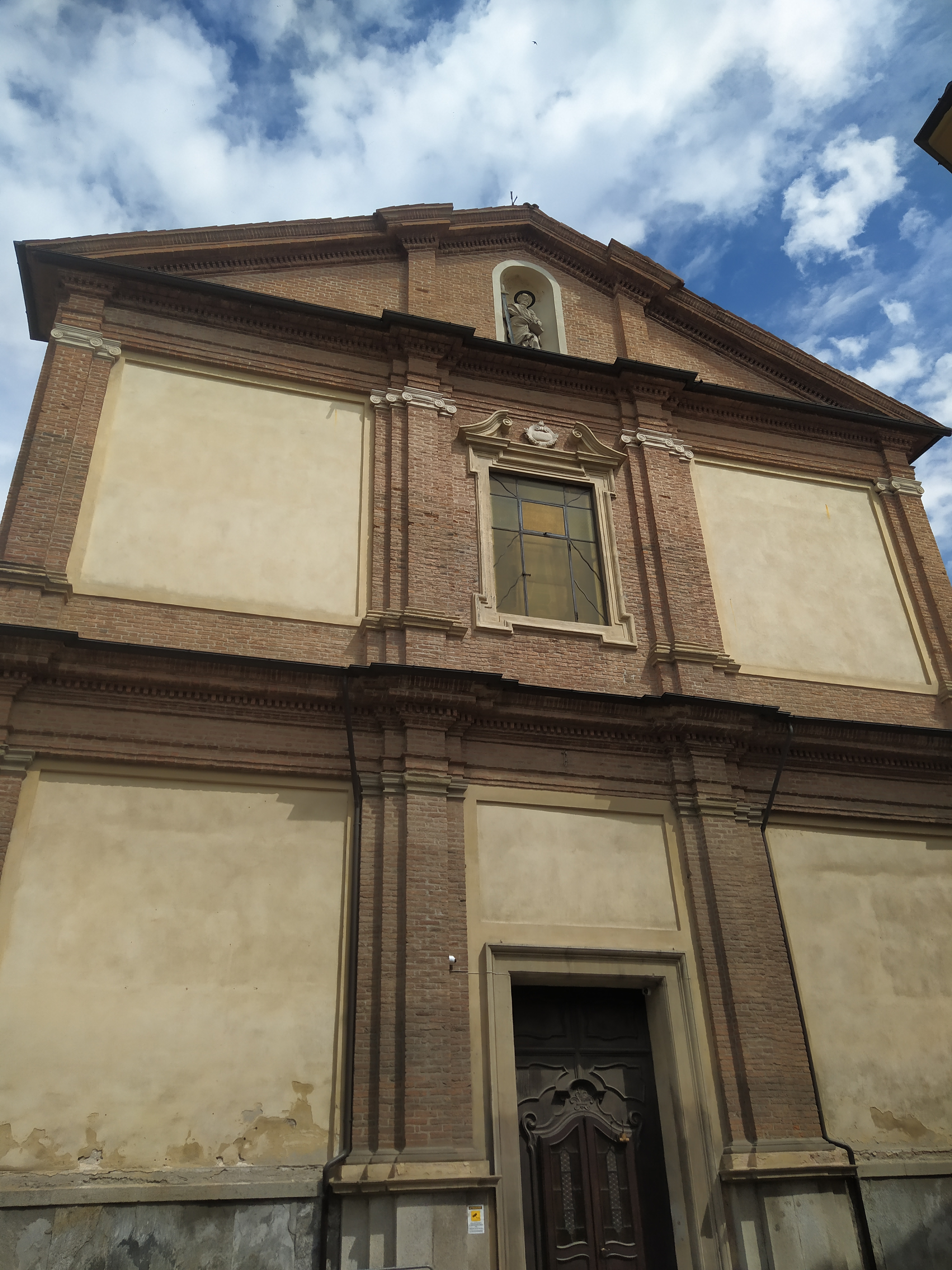
Piacenza - Church of San Paolo Apostolo - facciata

The church of San Paolo is a Roman Catholic church, located in Piacenza, Italy. Mentioned as the site of a parish church by 887, the present structure was built at the end of the seventeenth century.

Originally built in the Romanesque style, after a collapse of the church in 1681, it was again rebuilt, this time in Baroque architecture style. Despite the single nave, the facade was given four wide compartments or portals that once housed highly admired frescoes by Bartolomeo Baderna. Inside, the nave vault contains frescoes by Luciano Ricchetti depicting the Beatitudes. Natali also designed the window scenes. The interior of the facade still contains the frescoes by Baderna, depicting Episodes of Bible by Baderna, who also completed the choir frescoes depicting Lives of saints. At the entrance, on the right wall, there is a 14th-century Enthroned Madonna. The Chapel of the Madonna della Corona is frescoed by Giambattista Natali and restored by Sidoli in the last century. The chapel on the right next to the sacristy had an altarpiece of Martyrdom of San Biagio (St Blaise) by Robert de Longe.
