= Giovanni Battista Draghi =

Giovanni Batista (or Battista) Draghi may refer to:

- Giovanni Battista Draghi (composer) (c. 1640–1708), Italian composer and keyboard player
- Giovanni Evangelista Draghi (1657–1712), Italian painter of the Baroque period, sometimes mistakenly called Giovanni Battista
