= San Pietro, Piacenza =

Church in Piacenza, Emilia Romagna, Italy

Coordinates: 45.052750°N 9.695917°E

San Pietro is a Roman Catholic church in central Piacenza, Emilia Romagna, Italy. The church was built over the site of an ancient church titled San Pietro in Foro (St Peter of the Roman Forum).

== History ==
A church was present at the site, which included the old Roman forum by 809, but it was rebuilt after a fire in 1174. In about 1583, Duke Ranuccio I Farnese had invited the Jesuits into the duchy, and ceded them the church. They razed the ancient structure and replaced it with the present church with construction spanning from 1585 and 1587. The belltower dates to the 17th century. In 1607, the Jesuits founded a seminary at this site. However, in 1768 the order was expelled from the duchy. While the Jesuits returned some decades after the Napoleonic wars, they remained briefly until 1848 at the church of San Pietro. Since 1893, San Pietro was made a parish church. In the early decades of the 1900 the church underwent further restoration work, including of the present façade.

The adjacent Palazzo del Collegio dei Gesuiti was completed in 1593, and now houses the Biblioteca Comunale Passerini Landi. In 1840s, the library was said to house thousands of volumes of sacred and profane books, as well as private letters and manuscripts.

== Interior ==
In the chancel there are frescoes by Roberto de Longe and a baroque main altar derives from a chapel of the cathedral .

In the guide of 1842, the church is said to contain:

- First chapel on right
  - St Aloysius Gonzaga and St Joseph and Child Jesus: altarpieces by Giovanni Battista Tagliasacchi
  - San Francis di Girolamo 1841 copy of painting originally by Francesco Podesti
- Second chapel on right
  - St Francis Xavier by Clemente Ruta
- Chapel on right accessed below choir
  - Statue of Santa Filomena by Graziani
  - St Ursula by Marcantonio Franceschini
  - St Jerome, copy of work by Guercino
  - Saints Peter and Paul being led to Martyrdom by Ercole Graziani the Younger
- Organ (1847) by brothers Serassi of Bergamo
- Chapel of St Ignatius of Loyola
  - St Ignatius by Tagliasacchi
  - Sacred Heart of Christ, a sculpture by Gaspare Landi
- Chapel of St Stanislaus Kostka
  - St Stanislaus by Giovanni Gioseffo dal Sole
- Chapel of the Congregation
  - Annunciation copy by school of Guido Reni
  - Relics of San Regius Martyr
  - Archangel Raphael and Tobias by Giovanni Bottani

An inventory from the 1840s, noted that the church contained an altarpieces of St Aloysius Gonzaga and St Joseph with child Jesus in his arms by Giovanni Battista Tagliasacchi. There was a Deposition by Giovanni Rubini. The church had a portrait of Paolo Casati, a polymath jesuit. A painting in the church of St Ferdinand of Spain attributed to Antonia di Borbone, daughter of Duke Don Ferdinando.

== See also ==
- List of Jesuit sites

== Sources ==
- La patria; geografia dell' Italia: Provincia di Parma e Piacenza, by Gustavo Chiesi, Torino, 1902, page 172.
- Comune Piacenza entry on church.
