= Santa Brigida, Piacenza =

Church in Piacenza, Italy

Coordinates: 45.05364°N 9.68889°E

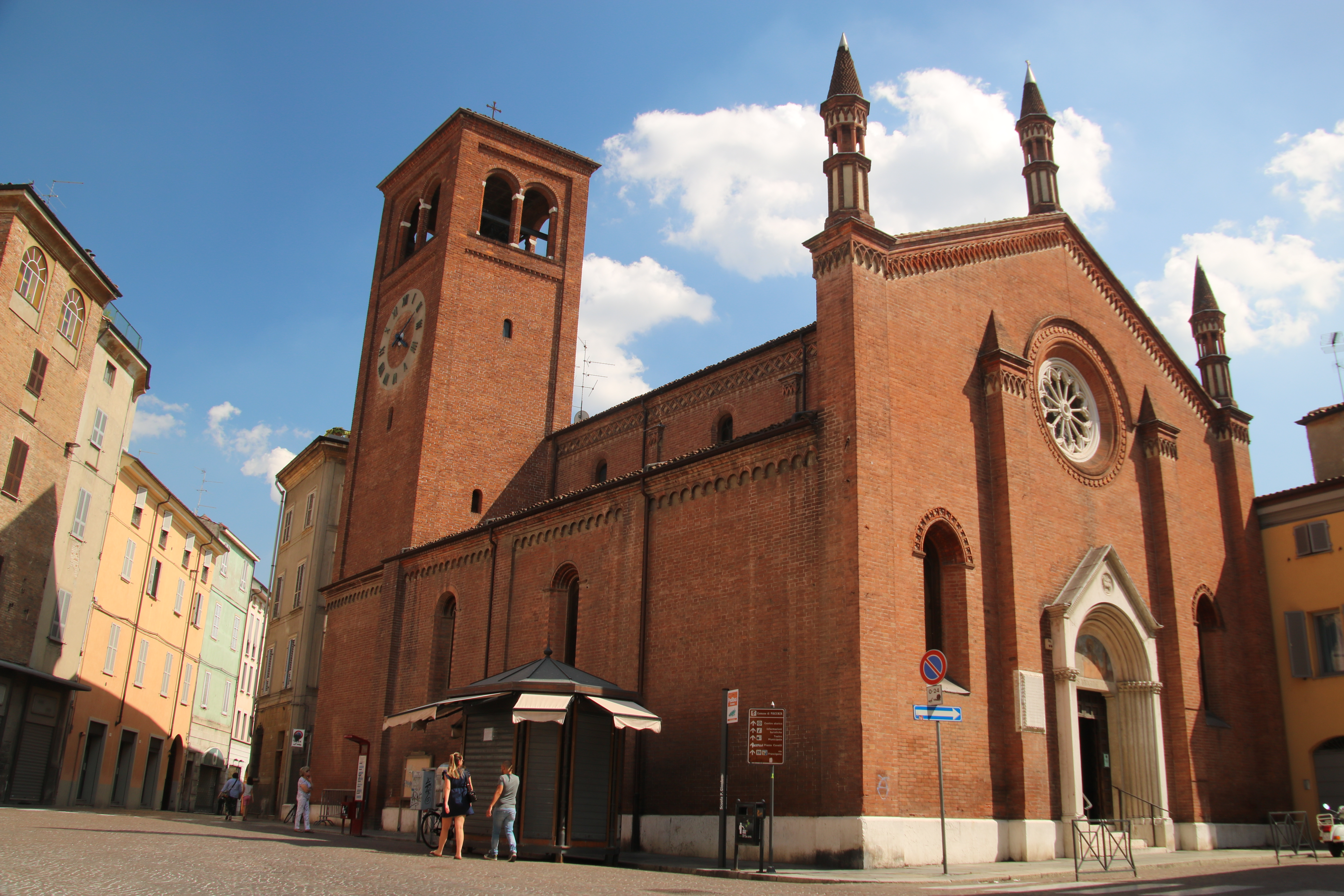
Church of facade and bell-tower

Santa Brigida is a Neo-Gothic style, Roman Catholic parish church, located at Via del Castello #2, corner with Piazza del Borgo, in Piacenza, Region of Emilia Romagna, Italy.

== History ==
A church at the site, dedicated to the Irish female saint Bridget putatively was established here by 868 by the Bishop Donatus. The church was located outside the early medieval walls, it was attached to a hostel servicing travelers en route to Rome and other pilgrimage sites.

In 1140, a fire destroyed the neighborhood and this church. In this church in December 1183, the Peace of Constance, a treaty between the Lombard League and the Holy Roman Emperor Frederick Barbarossa was signed by representatives of the League. In 1632, the church was assigned to the Barnabite order, until their suppression in 1769. In 1779 it was given to the order of the Crociferi, who kept it till 1805.

An inventory of works in the church in 1842, finds that the chapel of the Crucifix is stated to have a "Walk to Calvary" by Giovanni Rubbini. A painting by Felice Boselli depicts Christ displayed to the People by Pilate. In the choir is a depiction of St Brigida heals the blind by Pietro Francesco Ferrante. A Martyrdom of St Andrew Apostle painted by Camillo Gavasetti was moved to this church from the former church of San Vincenzo. The dome was painted with an Ascension of the Virgin by il Fiammingo (Robert de Longe. A depiction of the Blessed Alessandro Sauli was painted by Giovanni Battista Tagliasacchi.

A major reconstruction in 1895-1899 gave the church its present neo-gothic exterior. The 20th-century baptismal font is the work of Piacenza sculptor Paolo Perotti.
