= Oratory of San Cristoforo, Piacenza =

Deconsecrated former church or chapel in Italy

Coordinates: 45.0532°N 9.6973°E

== History ==
The Oratory of San Cristoforo is a deconsecrated former Roman Catholic church or chapel located at the chamfered corner of Vie Gregorio X and Angelo Genocchi, in the north-central sector of the historic center of Piacenza, Italy. It rises a block North West of the former Chiesa Sacro Cuore (Gesu) erected by the Jesuits and now housing the Teatro Gioia. The oratory presently houses an exposition space and museum named the Piccolo Museo della Poesia (Small Museum of Poetry).

The centralized structure was once known as the Oratorio della Morte (Oratory of Death) because it belonged to the confraternity of the same name, a group that subsidized the burial and memorial rites of its members. The architect was the Duchal architect, Domenico Valmagina. The elaborate interior was frescoed with quadratura by Ferdinando Galli Bibiena. In an 1842 inventory, the church had an altarpiece depicting the Virgin and St Gregory by Roberto da Longe.

A confraternity, previously dedicated to St Cristopher, was previously based first at the church of Santa Maria dell’Argine Church since 1260, and in the 16th Century it was fused with the Confraternity della Morte which had moved to San Silvestro Church, next to a Benedictine order monastery. In 1686 this structure was commissioned, with patronage from Conte Roncovieri, and inaugurated in 1690. During the Napoleonic invasion, the church was closed, and only reopened for cult later in the 19th century. Restorations did not start until 1960s, and the building was reopened in 2003. Since September 2020 it has been home to the museum of poetry.

== Current use as a museum ==
Since 2014 the former oratory has also been home to the Piccolo Museo della Poesia (Small Museum of Poetry), recognized by the Italian Ministry of Culture as one of the few poetry museums in Europe. In addition to safeguarding the building’s historical heritage, the institution curates poetry-related collections and promotes dialogue between literature and contemporary art.

Over the years, the museum has organized temporary exhibitions with Italian contemporary artists, often combining poetry, painting, sculpture and installation art. Notable exhibitions include:

- Marco Nereo Rotelli – Vola alta, parola (2023)
- Cesare Catania – L’Abbraccio. Quando l’Arte Avvolge le Parole (2023)
- Edgardo Abbozzo – Un’Arte di Pensiero (2024)
- Omar Galliani – Ab umbra lumen. Galliani incontra Bibiena (2022)

Through these programs, the oratory functions not only as a preserved religious and architectural landmark but also as an active cultural institution in the city of Piacenza.
