= Turbini =

Turbini is a surname. Notable people with the surname include:

- Gasparo Antonio Turbini (1728–1802), Italian architect
- Giuseppe Turbini (1702–1788), Italian painter
