= Santa Maria in Cortina, Piacenza =

Building in Piacenza, Italy

Coordinates: 45.04976°N 9.69368°E

Santa Maria in Cortina is a small, Roman Catholic but now deconsecrated church located on Via Verdi, across from the Teatro Municipale and near the church of Sant'Antonino in the city of Piacenza in Italy. The name Cortina putatively derives from being nearby the offices of the ducal court in Piacenza.

== History ==
A church was initially built here by Bishop San Savino (375–420) to house the relics of the martyr and saint Antoninus of Piacenza (died 303). Those relics, putatively found in a well, were later transferred to the nearby large basilica of Sant'Antonino. Initially a Romanesque structure, it was rebuilt in the 10th and 11th centuries. In 1478 the church was struck by lightning and destroyed in the subsequent fire, and again rebuilt. In 1563, it was no longer considered a parish church, and a few years later it was converted in the oratory for the Congregation of the Dottrina Cristiana, which had been established by the blessed Paolo Burali to educate the youth about the faith. In 1856 the church was again refurbished to give it its simple exterior appearance with a round oculus over a peaked portal. During this refurbishment, evidence was found that this area was a paleo-Christian necropolis.

The apse is frescoed by Remondino da Piacenza with a cycle of 16th-century frescoes that depict the Birth of the Virgin, the Annunciation, Marriage of the Virgin, Presentation to the Temple, Assumption of the Virgin, Apostles find the Tomb of Mary Empty. The church houses a venerated icon of baby Maria. The church preserves a sbterranean hypogeum that housed the first tomb of Sant’Antonino.
