= Claudio Carosino =

Italian physician

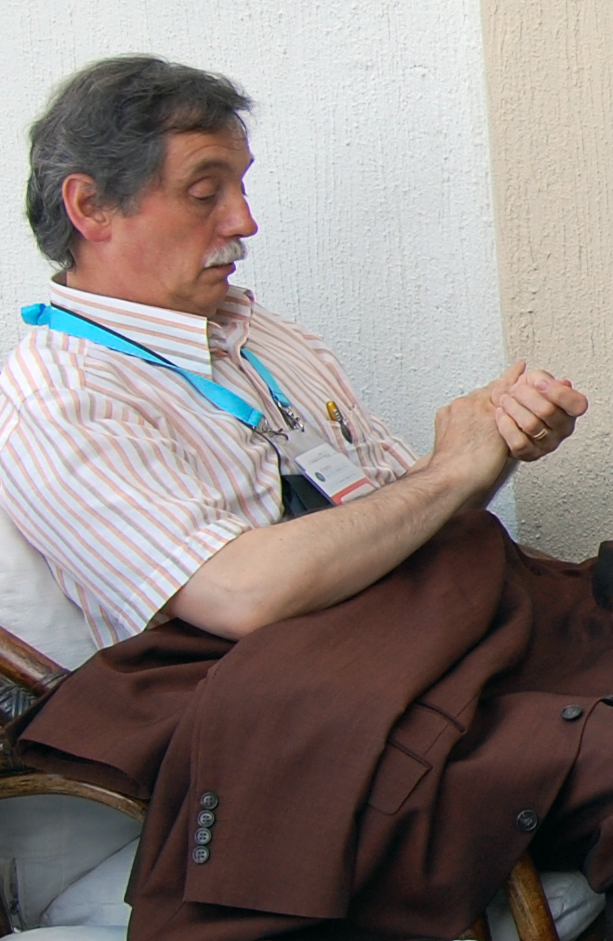
- Born: 12 March 1951; Busseto
- Died: 24 October 2010 (aged 59); Le Roncole
- Occupation: General Practitioner
- Spouse: Maurizia

Claudio Carosino, MD (12 March 1951 – 24 October 2010) was an Italian general practitioner and family physician, tutor and mentor engaged in rural medicine. Carosino was shot and killed by a patient while performing a house visit in the rural village of Roncole Verdi in Italy.

== Early life ==
Always keen on helping the disadvantaged and those in need, he had been an active member of many volunteer organizations since childhood, and spent a few of his high school summers accompanying disabled and ill people to Lourdes with other volunteers of UNITALSI (Unione Nazionale Italiana Trasporto Ammalati a Lourdes e Santuari Internazionali). He attended the High School of Cremona, where he graduated from Liceo Ginnasio Manin in 1970. Afterwards he enrolled in medical school at University of Parma.

== Professional life ==
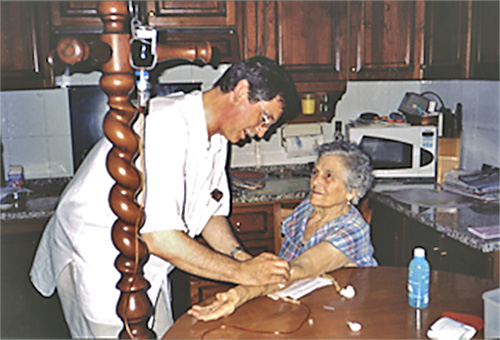
Claudio Carosino while carrying out a home visit

After graduating from the Medical School at Parma University in 1976, he was offered a condotta (a General Practice Position before the Italian National Health System was established in 1978) ad interim in Roncole Verdi, a rural village near Busseto, and one in Sant'Andrea. In 1978 the SSN (National Health System) was founded by law and Carosino was given a position as a General Practitioner in the same rural area of Busseto, where he had been working since his qualification. He ran three practices within the area (in Roncole Verdi, Sant’Andrea and Samboseto).

Many years later, when the SSN was trying to create Health Centers (case della salute) to bring all General Practitioners of the same district together, Carosino worked on the project in the Busseto area. His commitment to this project led him and his colleagues to open the Medicina Oggi Group Practice in 2006, collecting the five GPs of the area together under one roof, before the National Health System. Knowing that the new practice would have taken him away from the countryside, Carosino decided to keep his Roncole and Sant'Andrea offices functioning at least two days a week.

In 2011, four years after the Medicina Oggi Group Practice opening, the SSN established the first Health Center of the Parma rural area, clearly in Busseto, which was named after Carosino. He was also qualified in the specialization of Geriatric Medicine in 1979 and of Public Health in 1983.

In the nineties, he went back to school. In 1998 he graduated from Mario Negri Institute school of research in General Practice (Scuola di Ricerca in Medicina Generale) and in 2002, he attended a course on Clinic Epidemiology for General Practitioners organized by the Superior Institute of Health (Istituto Superiore di Sanità).

== Scientific activities and nonprofit associations ==
Besides his work as a family physician, Carosino was also involved in many other activities, such as research, teaching and tutoring. Carosino had been a member of EGPRN (European General Practice Research Network) since 1998, participating in the Educational Committee. Furthermore, he was the research coordinator, an executive member and the Italian representative of EURIPA (European Rural and Isolated Practitioners Association). He was also involved in EURACT (European Academy of Teachers in General Practice).

At a national level, he had been the president of the Parma local section of SIMG (Italian Society of General Practice) since 2005 and the vice-president of the SIMG Emilia-Romagna Regional section since 2007. He had also been a member of the SIMM (Italian Society of Medicine of Migration) since 1993 and of SIMET (Italian Society of Tropical Medicine) since 1998. Finally, he was also a member of the Catholic Medical Doctor Association.

He had also been a passionate teacher at the General Practice Vocational Training course of Emilia Romagna, appreciated and respected by his students, since 1998. He was among the first Italian doctors who welcomed trainees and junior GPs of other European countries to their practices, participating in the Hippokrates Exchange programme of the Vasco da Gama Movement.

Next to the scientific associations, Carosino was also involved in charitable and philanthropic organizations. He was among the founders and Chairman for quite some time, of a nonprofit association (onlus – non lucrative for the community good) called Aiuto Minori Terzo Mondo (Help Underage Third World) that supports Identes missionaries work and special programs in Italy and in Peru. In the Cordillera of the Andes, the Missionaries of the Santa Maria degli Angeli Monastery run an institute for children from 6 to 18 years old; after the death of Carosino, the association received significant donations in his memory, enabling them to add a small medical office to the institute. The small clinic will be named after the rural General Practitioner from Busseto and the opening ceremony will be held in 2012.

== Personal life ==
During his first pilgrimage to Lourdes, Carosino met Maurizia, an adolescent girl in a wheelchair as a result of polio. Maurizia was also a member of a Christian charity organization and a few years later, after his graduation from Medical School in 1977, they were married. They had two children: Cristina and Stefano.

== In memoriam ==
In memory of Carosino, the Vasco da Gama Movement along with EURIPA and WONCA Europe established the Carosino Prize to award the trainee or junior general practitioner/family physician for the best completion of their Hippokrates Exchange program in a rural setting. The 2011 award was given to Fabrizia Farolfi, MD and the 2012 award winner was Marine Parmentier, MD from France who visited Angus Gallacher, MD in Scotland, UK.

On 19 July 2013, Carosino was awarded with the golden medal of merit for his contribution to public health by the Italian Ministry of Health.
