= San Bartolomeo, Busseto =

Church in Busseto, Italy

Coordinates: 44°58′51.6″N 10°2′34.7″E

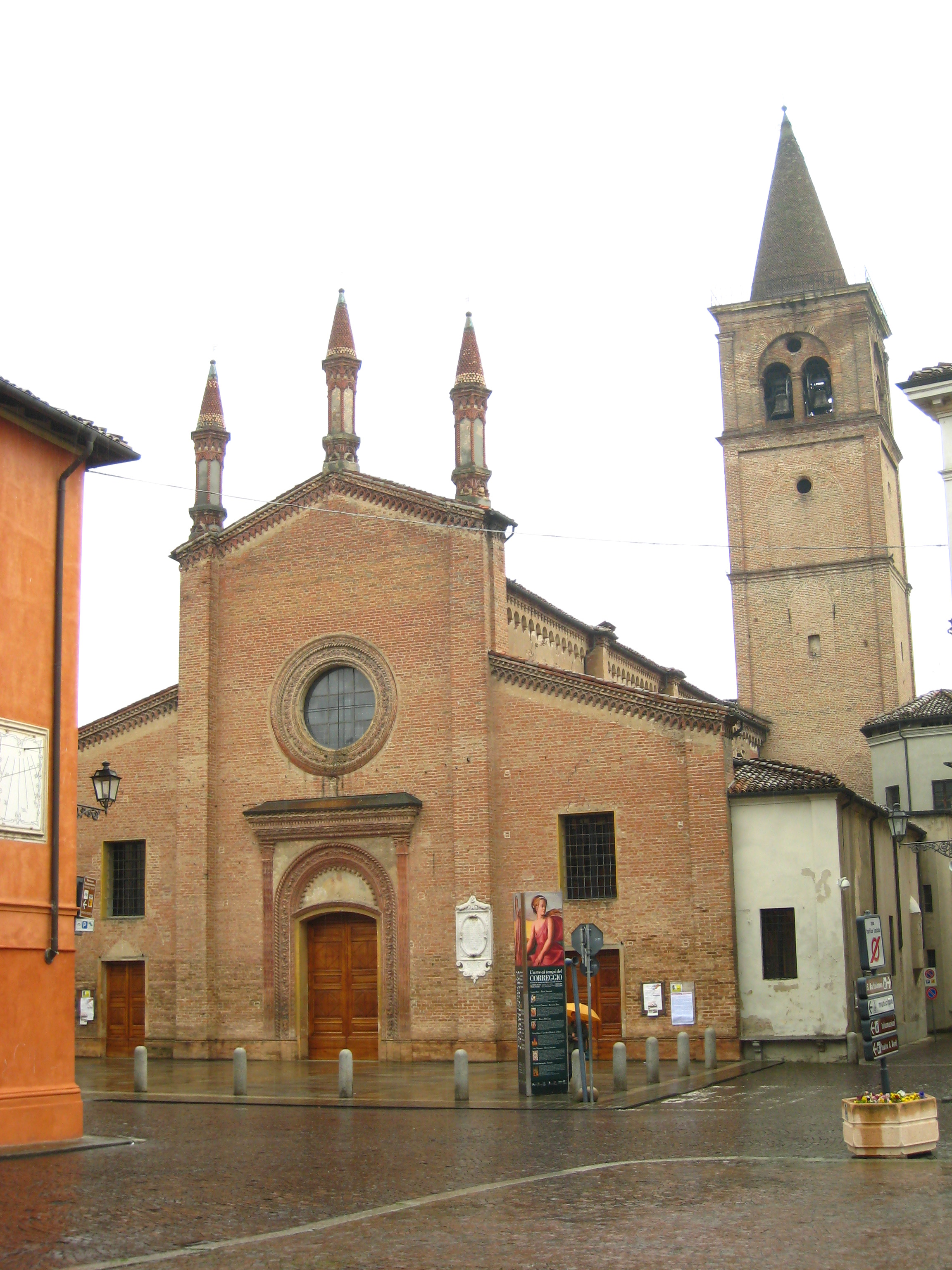
Front view of the church

San Bartolomeo is a Gothic-style, Roman Catholic collegiate church located in Busseto, in the Italian region of Emilia-Romagna.

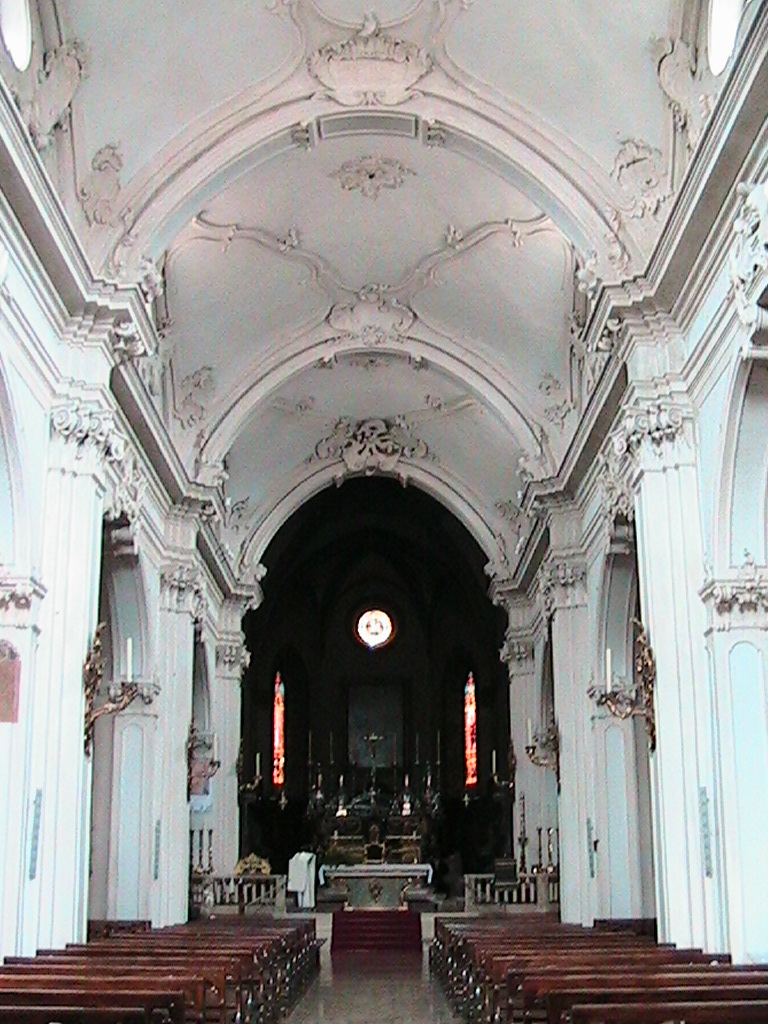
The inside of the church

== History ==
A church at the site is mentioned by 1336. The church was rebuilt in 1437 as a collegiate church under the patronage of Orlando Pallavicino il Magnifico. The brick facade was designed in Lombard Gothic (circa 1480-1490) by Jacopo de' Stavolis of Polesine.

The interior of the church was densely decorated with stucco by Fortunato Rusca and Carlo Bossi. The church conserves 15 canvases depicting the Mysteries of the Rosary (circa 1576-1581) by Vincenzo Campi. It has frescoes depicting the Doctors of the Church (1538–39) by Michelangelo Anselmi. The main altar has mid-18th-century gilded bronze statues by Giovanni Battista Febbrari. The church has a rich collection of sacred objects.

An inventory in 1883 noted a painting in the Chapel of St Joseph, depicting the Virgin and Child, Joseph, and St Cristopher by Francesco Luccio Borgheggiano. In the chapel of the Madonna del Parto are frescoes depicting Saints James the Minor and Bernard by Pietro Balestra. The cupola of the Chapel of the Virgin of the Rosary, was frescoed with a Coronation of the Virgin (1704) by Giovanni Evangelista Draghi. The chapel of the Holy Sacrament, had an altarpiece depicting the Immaculate Conception by the school of il Malosso.
