= Santuario della Madonna dei Prati, Roncole Verdi =

Catholic church in Parma province, Italy

Coordinates: 44°58′04.1″N 10°05′05.0″E

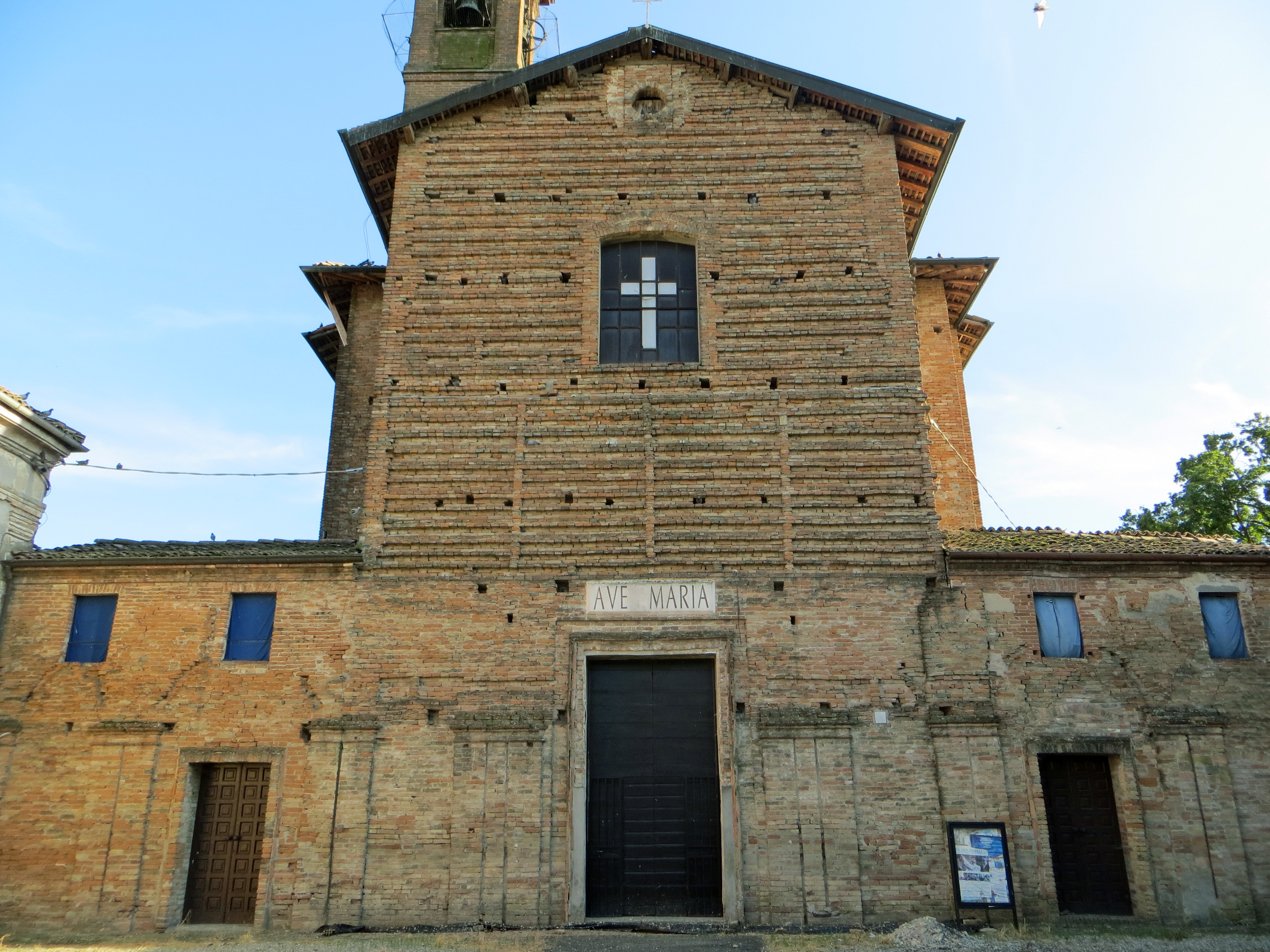
Sanctuary of the Madonna dei Prati (Madonna dei Prati, Busseto) - facade

The Sanctuary of the Madonna dei Prati (Our Lady of the Fields) is a 17th-century, Roman Catholic church, dedicated to Marian devotion, located a few kilometers outside of Busseto, in the frazione of Roncole Verdi, in the province of Parma, region of Emilia-Romagna, Italy.

== History ==
The Sanctuary was erected in 1690-1696 under the designs of a local architect, Francesco Callegari. It was the site of a parish church till 1926, when it became a sanctuary due to the veneration by pilgrims of an icon of the Virgin, denominated Madonna dei Prati.

However the church is likely most memorable for being the parish church near the birthplace of Giuseppe Verdi, and interlaced with some events of his early life. The rector of this church, Don Paolo Costa, was putatively the first mentor for musical training of a seven year old Verdi, who was born nearby. However, the rector Costa died soon after in 1820, and Verdi continued training under maestro Don Piero Baistrocchi.

A more dramatic event occurred in 1828, during the local festival honoring the Madonna. Verdi was making his way to the event to sing in boys' choir when a lightning bolt struck the church, killing the two choirboys and four priests. Verdi had been late to arrive due to the storm.

Some tellings of the events, say that one of the dead choirboys had bullied Verdi, and he had decreed a curse on him. This telling is not found on the official version.

The interior of the church is otherwise of no great artistic interest, but the story can be read in many ways either as a warning to Verdi, who for many years was seen as anti-clerical, or as a sign of god's protection of the artist. The connection of the lightning strike to Verdi is not emphasized in the Diocese entry on the church.
