= Bartolomeo Baderna =

Italian painter (1655–1681)

Bartolomeo Baderna (1655–1681) was an Italian painter and engraver of the Baroque period.

== Biography ==
He was born in Piacenza. His manner in engraving is described to be similar to that of Odoardo Fialetti. He is described as a pupil of the painter, Cavaliere Pietro Francesco Ferrante (sometimes called Giovanni Francesco) of Bologna. Baderna painted works for Santa Maria in Campagna, and with the help of his brother Pietro, frescoes (1681) in both the interior and exterior for San Paolo, both churches in Piacenza.
