= Santa Brigida =

Santa Brigida or Santa Brígida (Portuguese and Spanish for Saint Brigit) may refer to:

== People ==
- Saint Brigid of Kildare
- Saint Birgitta of Sweden

== Places ==
Brazil

- Santa Brígida, Bahia

Italy

- Santa Brigida, the Swedish National Church in Rome
- Santa Brigida, Lombardy a comune in the Province of Bergamo
- Santa Brigida, Piacenza, a church in Piacenza

Spain

- Santa Brígida, Las Palmas, a municipality in the Province of Las Palmas

== Ships ==
- Santa Brigida, Spanish treasure ship; see Action of 16 October 1799
