= Sant'Antonino, Piacenza =

Basilica in Piacenza, Italy

Coordinates: 45.0494°N 9.6947°E

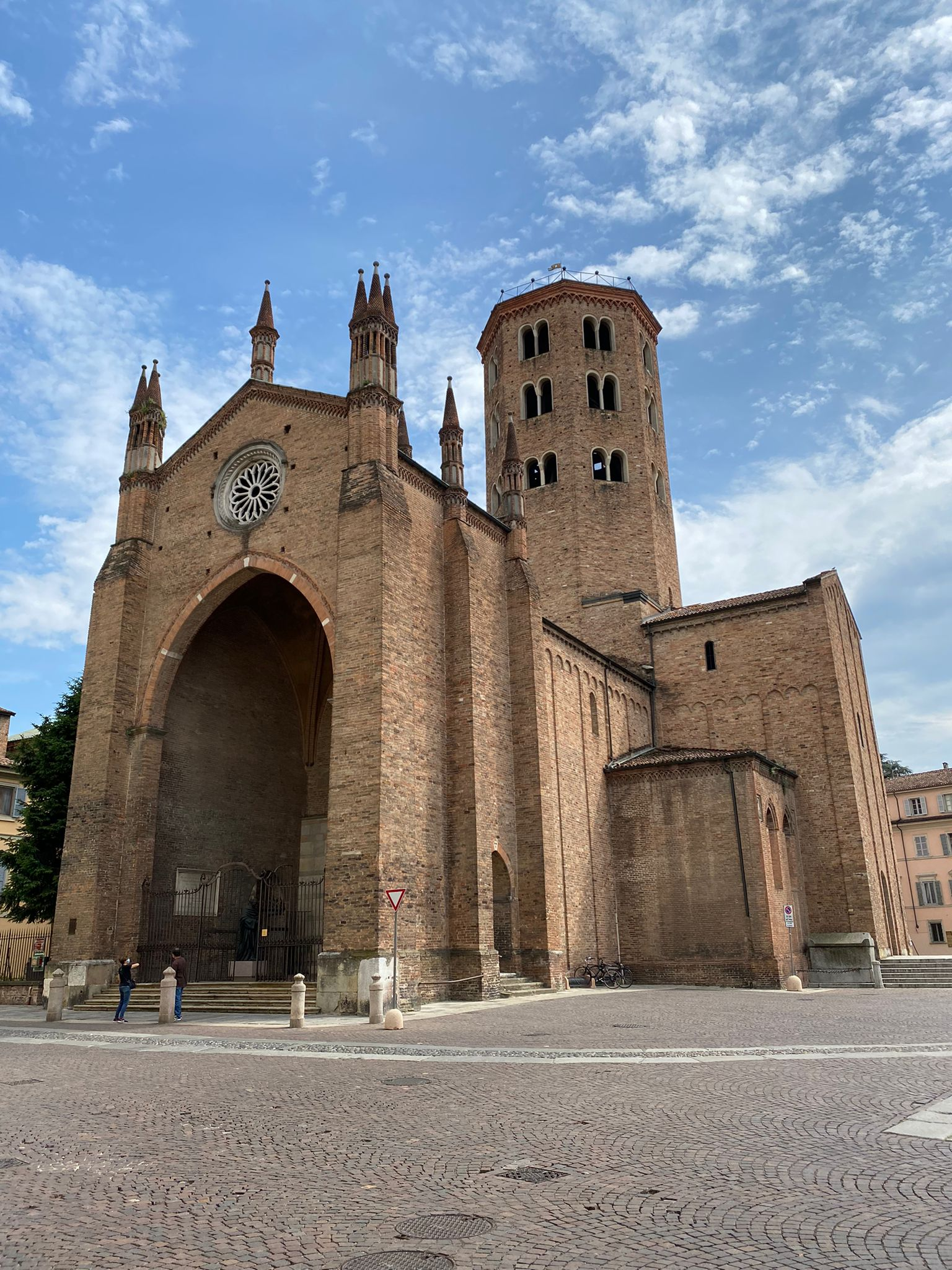
Sant'Antonino

The Basilica of Sant'Antonino is a medieval Roman Catholic basilica in the city of Piacenza in Italy. it is dedicated to the patron saint of the city, Antoninus.

== Description ==
The relics of Antoninus were originally found at the nearby site of the church of Santa Maria in Cortina which held an early Christian martyrium. The present building was the work of Bishop Sigifredo, who dedicated it in 1014 as a collegiate church. Siegfried chose the form of an oriented basilica with a western nave and a campanile. The interior was decorated with early Romanesque painting, a little of which survives.

The basilica stood along a pilgrimage route, and was designed by Pietro Vago in 1350. In 1998, a large statue of Gregory X, sculpted by Giorgio Groppi, was placed under the large Portico of Paradise. The Portico was itself completed in the 12th century with carvings by the school of Niccolò da Ferrara. The church has been rebuilt and modified over the centuries. The carved wood ceiling was substituted by Gothic tracery. In the 19th century pseudo-gothic decoration was added to the interior. The adjacent cloister dates to 1483.

The interior of the church contains frescoes by Camillo Gavasetti in the presbytery, and canvases by Robert de Longe. Many of the works have been transferred to the Civic Gallery at the Palazzo Farnese. Among the works retained is a "Coronation of the Virgin" by Gian Battista Trotti (il Malosso).
