= San Vincenzo, Piacenza =

Deconsecrated church in Emilia Romagna, Italy

Coordinates: 45.04923°N 9.69586°E

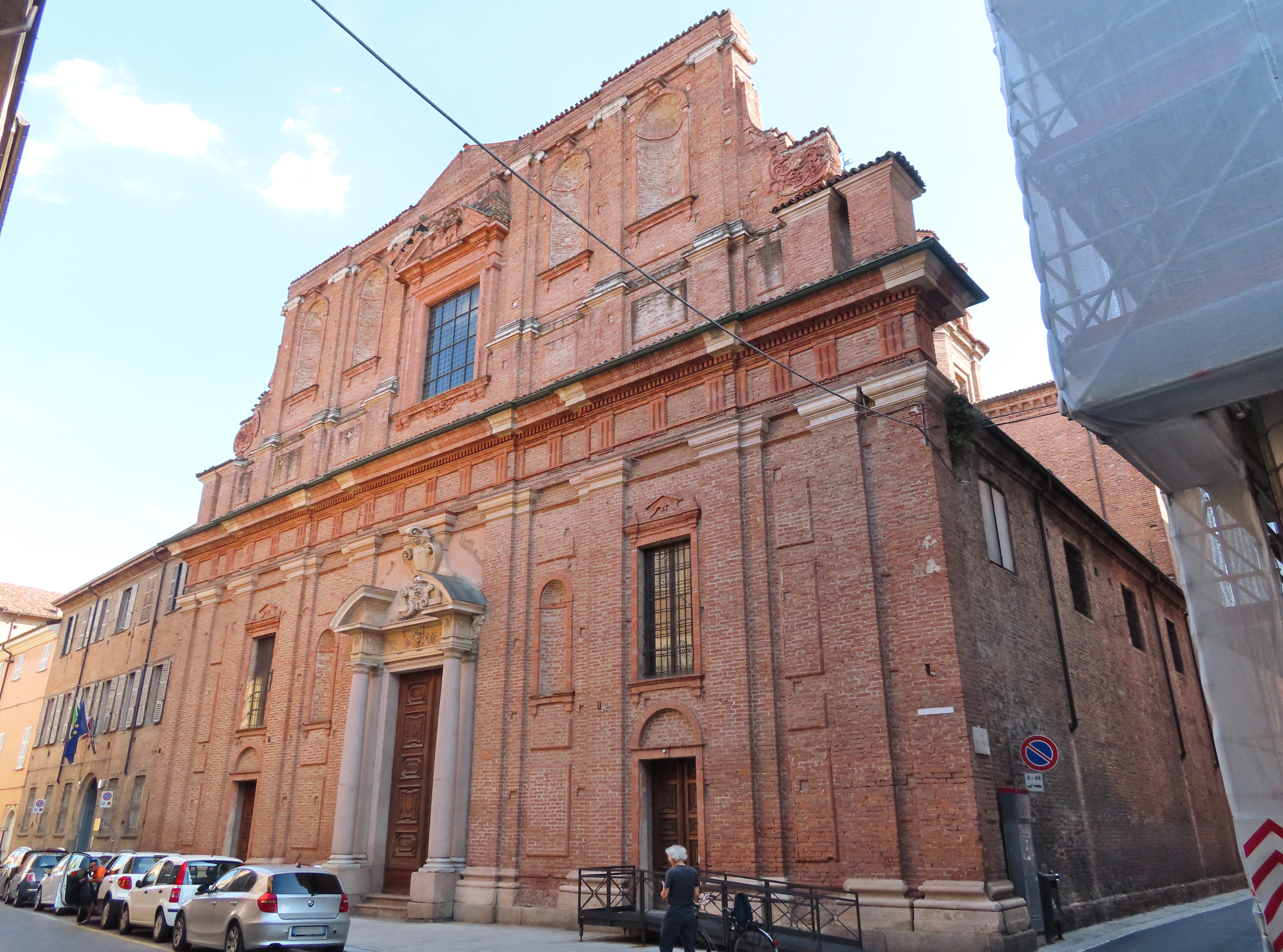

San Vincenzo is a Baroque style, Roman Catholic church, now deconsecrated, located at Via Scalabrini #6 in the South-East quadrant of Piacenza, Region of Emilia Romagna, Italy. The church was restored starting in 2009 for use as an auditorium (Sala dei Teatini) and to host concerts.

== History ==
Prior to 1278, the site was occupied by a parish church, dedicated to St Vincent the martyr, oriented as was typical with a facade opening to the West and an apse in the East. The portal was located near the site of the present bell-tower. Circa 1568, during the bishopric of Paolo Burali d'Arezzo (beatified 1772), the church was transferred to the Theatine order, which Burali had embraced. The Theatines reconstructed the structure, and patronized the decoration. The architecture was modelled by Pietro Caracciolo after the Theatine mother church of Sant'Andrea della Valle in Rome.

The church was suppressed in 1810 and neared demolishment, but it was reconsecrated by 1822.

An inventory from 1842, noted that the second chapel from the entrance, on the right, had an altarpiece depicting Virgin St Bernard (1643) painted by Domenico Fiasella. This painting was commissioned by Count Bernardo Morando, who also commissioned the Purification painted by Carlo Francesco Nuvolone, originally at an altar in the Palazzo del Collegio dei Mercanti, but later moved here. The next chapel had an unfinished canvas depicting St Cajetan of Thiene, founder of the Theatine order, painted by Angelo Massarotti. The fourth chapel on the right had a canvas depicting San Carlo Borromeo baptizing an infant by Alessandro Tiarini.

In the right transept, were two canvases depicting King David and Prophet Isaiah (1530) by Camillo Boccaccino. Above the organ were two canvases depicting the Encounter of Solomon and the Queen of Sheba by Francisco Ferrante. Frescoes of the apse and choir were painted by Andrea Galluzzi, with also paintings depicting the Martyrdom of St Vincent by Roberto da Longe. The quadratura of the cupola was painted by Galluzi and the figures by Giovanni Evangelista Draghi, including the four virtues in the spandrels. The quadratura of the nave (1761) was completed by Felice Biella (1702 – 1786) with frescoes of figures by Federigo Ferrari.

On the left side of the church was an altarpiece depicting the Virgin and the Holy Trinity by Trotti. In the second chapel on the left was an altarpiece depicting Apoplexy of St Andrea Avellino, honoring another Theatine saint, and painted by Benedetto Marini. The fourth chapel on the left has an altarpiece depicting St Cecilia painted by Sebastiano Galleoti The sacristy was decorated by Camillo Gavasetti, who painted a canvas depicting Sant'Andrea Avellino in the church. Many of the altarpieces are now on display in the Pinacoteca of the Palazzo Farnese in town.
