= Santa Teresa di Carmelo, Piacenza =

Church in Piacenza, Italy

Coordinates: 45.04953°N 9.68954°E

Santa Teresa del Carmelo is a seventeenth-century Roman Catholic Baroque-style church located on Corso Vittorio Emanuele II #161 in Piacenza, Italy.

== History ==
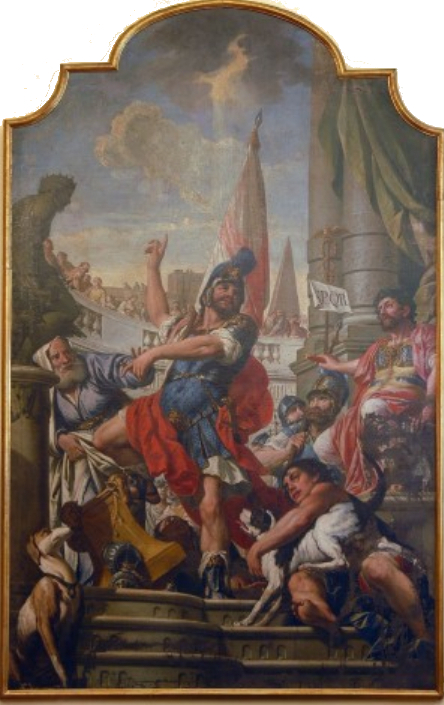
Saint Alexander of Bergamo overturns a pagan altar by Giacomo Ceruti, 1645

A church at the site, dedicated to the Holy Spirit, was administered by monks of the Humiliati order. In 1571, when the order was suppressed, the church became property of the bishopric. In 1627, the properties of the Humiliati were ceded to the Carmelite order. The nuns were granted by Duke Odoardo I Farnese the stones of the old Trebbia bridge for use in construction. Starting in 1650, they began to erect the present church, dedicated to St Teresa of Ávila. Most of the work was completed by 1652.

The church and adjacent monastery were suppressed in 1810, but re-opened in 1819 under the administration of the bishop, and used to house elderly and infirm priests.

The nuns of the order of Carmelitani Scalzi persisted in Piacenza, and were moved in 1962–1969 to a new monastery, located at Via Spinazzi #36 in the neighborhood of San Lazzaro Alberoni, outside of the city center. The nuns pursue a cloistered life at the monastery. Many of the original artworks were moved to the new site.

== Decoration ==
The interior decoration includes several chapels painted by Flemish artists such as Roberto De Longe (il Fiammingho) and by members of the Giovanni Battista Natali family, and the Brescian painter Giacomo Ceruti.

In the second chapel to the right, De Longe painted a fresco of Saint Teresa swooning before the child Jesus in an architectural niche by Giovanni Natali the younger. To the right of the choir is an altarpiece by Carlo Francesco Nuvolone. To the left of the sanctuary, there is a canvas depicting St Anthony of Padua by Francesco del Cairo.

It houses a bronze crucifix attributed to Francesco Algardi. Some of the quadrature decoration was completed by Giuseppe Turbini.
