= Ricchetti =

Ricchetti is a surname. Notable people with the surname include:

- Alberto Ricchetti (born 1985), Italian sprint canoer
- Luciano Ricchetti (1897-1977), Italian painter
- Pablo Ricchetti (born 1977), Argentine soccer midfielder
- Steve Ricchetti (born c. 1957), the founder and President of Richetti, Inc.

== See also ==
- Richetti, surname
