= Richetti =

Richetti is a surname. Notable people with the surname include:

- Adam Richetti (1909–1938), American criminal and Depression-era bank robber
- Carlos Richetti (born 1983), Italian baseball player
- Matteo Richetti (born 1974), Italian politician

== See also ==
- Joseph Shalit Riqueti (Richetti), Jewish-Italian scholar
- Ricchetti, surname
