= Antonio Fratacci =

Italian painter

Antonio Fratacci was an Italian painter of the first half of the 18th century.

== Biography ==
Fratacci was born in Parma or Bologna. He was a pupil of Ilario Spolverini and later of Carlo Cignani. He was active in 1738. He is known to have painted an altarpiece for the church of San Francesco in Reggio Emilia. he also painted for the churches of Sant'Alessandro, San Eustorgio, Santa Maria della Scala, and San Simpliciano in Milan.
