= Girolamo Pellizoni =

Italian painter

Giuseppe Pellizoni, also called il Crescini, (1688–18th-century) was an Italian painter of the Baroque period, active mainly in Cremona and Lombardy as a quadratura painter.

== Biography ==
He was born in Casalmaggiore, near Cremona. He was trained with Francesco Chiozzi. One of his pupils was Giuseppe Natali. He painted a canvas of Saints Biagio, Luca, and Pietro (1670) for the church of San Giovanni in Casalmaggiore. and for the church of Sant'Andrea in Mantua.
