= Carlo Natali =

Italian painter

Carlo Natali, also known as il Guardolino, (circa 1592- 1683) was an Italian painter of the Baroque period, active in Cremona and Bologna

== Biography ==
Carlo was initially a pupil of the Mannerist painters Andrea Mainardi and Giovanni Battista Trotti in Cremona. He then moved to train with Guido Reni. He then moved to Rome and then Genoa. In Genoa, he painted a frieze for the Palazzo Doria, where he met Giulio Cesare Procaccini (died 1628). He returned to Cremona where he worked in the fabbrica of the Cathedral until his death.

Carlo was the father of one of the Italian painters named Giovanni Battista Natali. This Natali was born in Bologna, circa 1630 and died in Cremona, circa 1700. He became a pupil of Pietro da Cortona in Rome, returned to work in Cremona. This Giovanni Battista was father of Giuseppe Natali (1652-1725).
