= Camillo Gavasetti =

Italian painter

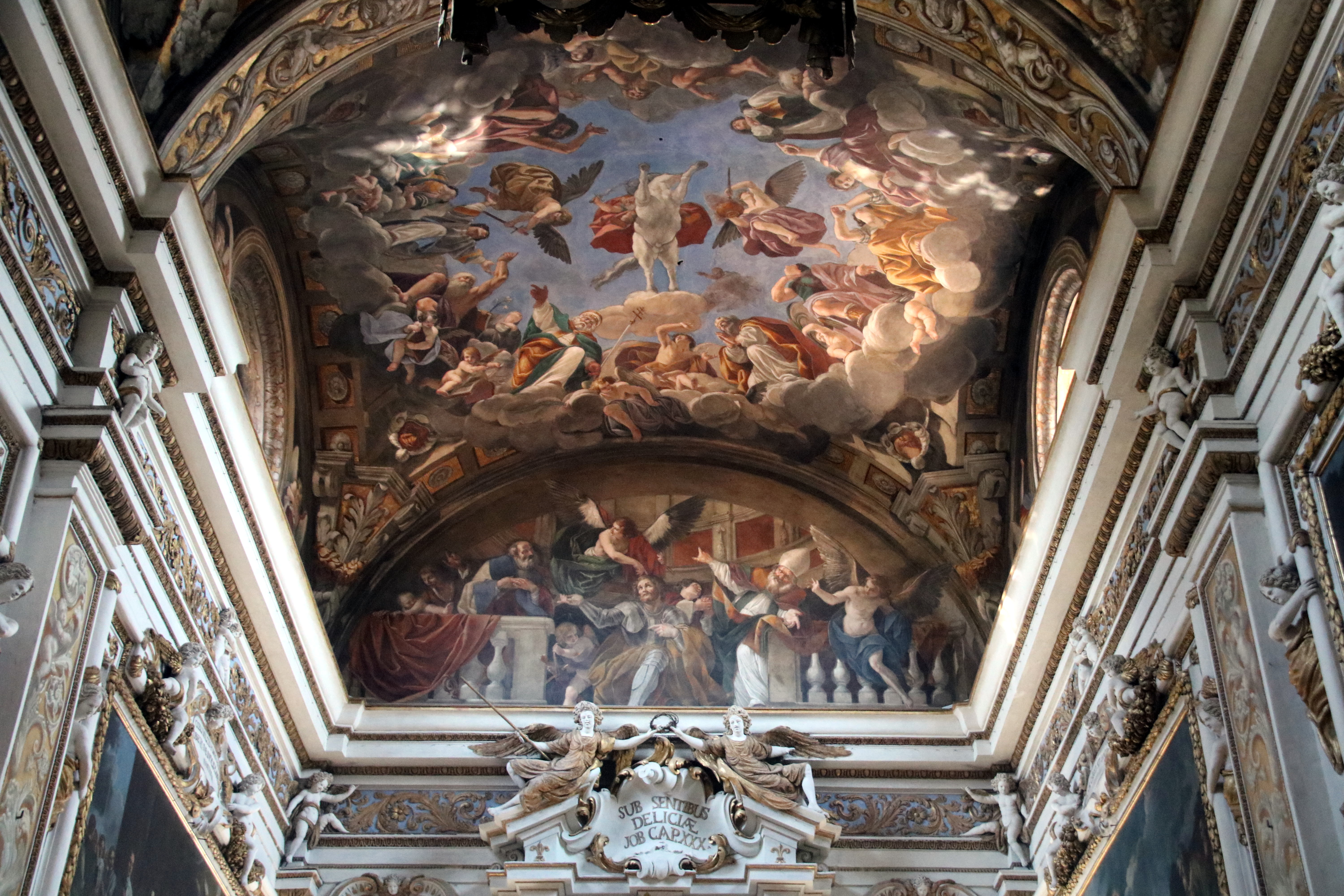
Camillo Gavasetti Portrait

Camillo Gavasetti (1596 – in or after 1630) was a native of Modena, who flourished about the year 1626. He studied under his father, Stefano Gavasetti, a miniature painter and gilder, but he rather followed the Carracci. His principal works are at Piacenza, where he is better known than at Parma or Modena. He was engaged with Piarini in painting Scriptural subjects. At the presbytery of the Church of Sant'Antonino at Piacenza, is a fresco representing a subject from the Apocalypse, which was esteemed by Guercino the finest work of art in that city. He also decorated portions of the church of San Vincenzo in Piacenza. He died young in 1630.
