= Luciano Ricchetti =

Italian painter (1845–1920)

Luciano Ricchetti (27 April 1897 – 30 November 1977) was an Italian painter, active mainly in his native Piacenza.

He initially studied at the Istituto Gazzola, where Francesco Ghittoni was teaching. He enrolled in the Italian infantry during the last year of World War I. During the 1920s, some of his income came as an illustrator for numerous journals and newspapers. In 1922, he was employed in the frescoes for the Sala degli Stemmi of the Castelo di Montechiaro in Rivergaro. At public art exhibitions, he submitted some canvases depicting landscapes, portraits, still lifes, and genre scenes with animals or persons.

In 1923, a stipend funded him to attend the Accademia di Brera in Milan, where he was a pupil of Ambrogio Alciati. There we won the Bozzi Caimi prize with a submission of Head of a Young Woman. In 1928, he received a commission for three paintings for the staircase of the Palazzo dei Consorzi agrari in Piacenza (now known as the palazzo ex Enel). In 1932, he was awarded a prize by the Rotary Club Italia for a portrait of Giuseppe Steiner at the Venice Biennale. He painted the decoration for the Casa Littoria of Piacenza which was destroyed after the fall of fascism. In 1938, he painted an official commission for the liceo classico Melchiorre Gioia, depicting Piacenza across the ages including one depicting the glories of the fascist era. This was also removed after the second world war. He painted frescoes for churches in Piacenza including Santa Maria della Pace, San Lazzaro Alberoni and Santa Teresa.

== Notes ==
- Dizionario d'arte Sartori
