= Antonio Draghi =

Italian composer

Antonio Draghi (17 January 1634 – 16 January 1700) was a Baroque composer. He possibly was the brother of Giovanni Battista Draghi.

Draghi was born at Rimini in Italy, and was one of the most prolific composers of his time. His contribution to the development of Italian opera was particularly significant. He began his musical career as a choirboy at Padua, but by 1657, he was appearing on stage, in the opera La fortuna di Rodope e di Damira which was produced in Venice. His first solo effort, the opera La Mascherata, appeared in 1666.

In 1668, Draghi was appointed to the court of Leopold I, Holy Roman Emperor, at Vienna, and he remained there until his death.

== List of operas ==
This is the complete list of the operas of Antonio Draghi.

Title	Genre	Subdivisions	Libretto	Première date	Place, Theatre	Notes
La mascherata	compositione drammatica	3 acts	Antonio Draghi	1 or 4 March 1666	Vienna, Kleines Hof	Act 3 lost
Vero amor fà soave ogni fatica	introduzione a un ballo	1 act	Antonio Draghi	6 February 1667	Vienna, Hofburg	Music lost
Comedia ridicula		3 acts	Anonymous	11 or 13 February 1668	Vienna, Hofburg	Act 3 lost
Gl'amori di Cefalo e Procri	rappresentazione drammatica	1 act	Antonio Draghi	9 June 1668	Vienna, Hofburg	
Achille riconosciuto			Francesco Ximenes	12 June 1668	Vienna, Hofburg	
Il Ciro vendicatore di se stesso	dramma per musica	1 act	Francesco Ximenes	18 November 1668	Amalienburg	
Chi più sa manco l'intende, overo Gli amori di Clodio, e Pompea	dramma per musica	3 acts	Francesco Ximenes	21 February 1669	Vienna, Emperor's rooms	
Il Perseo	drama musicale	3 acts	Aurelio Amalteo	15 July 1669	Vienna, Hofburg	Act 2 lost
Atalanta	dramma per musica	3 acts	Nicolò Minato	18 November 1669	Vienna, Hofburg	Acts 1 and 3 lost
Le rise di Democrito	trattenimento per musica	3 acts	Nicolò Minato	17 February 1670	Vienna, Hofburg	
Leonida in Tegea	dramma per musica	prologue, 3acts	Nicolò Minato	9 June 1670	Vienna, Hofburg	
Iphide Greca	dramma per musica	3 acts	Nicolò Minato	12 June 1670	Vienna, Hofburg	Music lost
Penelope (La casta Penelope)	dramma per musica	3 acts	Nicolò Minato	18 November 1670	Vienna, Hofburg	
L'avidità di Mida	trattenimento per musica	3 acts	Nicolò Minato	8 February 1671	Vienna, Ritterstube	
La prosperità di Elia Sejano	dramma per musica	3 acts	Nicolò Minato	9 June 1671	Vienna, Hofburg	With contributions by Leopold I
La gara dei genii	festa teatrale	1 act	Nicolò Minato	14 July 1671	Vienna, Hofburg	With contributions by Leopold I
Cidippe	dramma per musica	3 acts	Nicolò Minato	18 November 1671	Vienna, Hofburg	Act 2 lost. With contributions by Leopold I
Gl'atomi d'Epicuro	dramma per musica	prologue, 3 acts	Nicolò Minato	9 June 1672	Vienna, Hofburg	
Gundeberga	dramma per musica	3 acts	Nicolò Minato	12 July 1672	Vienna, Hofburg	Acts 1 and 3 lost. With contributions by Leopold I
Sulpitia	dramma per musica	3 acts	Nicolò Minato	21 November 1672	Vienna, Hofburg	Act 1 lost. With contributions by Leopold I
Il gioir della speranza	introduzione ad un balletto	1 act	Nicolò Minato	9 February 1673	Vienna, Emperor's rooms	
Batto convertito in sasso	musica di camera	1 act	Nicolò Minato	9 June 1673	Vienna, Favorita	
Provare per non recitare	composizione per musica	1 act	Nicolò Minato	15 October 1673	Vienna, Favorita	Music lost
Gl'incantesimi disciolti	introduzione d'un balletto	1 act	Nicolò Minato	17 October 1673	Karlau bei Graz	With contributions by Leopold I
La Tessalonica	dramma per musica	3 acts	Nicolò Minato	18 November 1673	Vienna, rooms of Archduchess Maria Anna	Music lost
La lanterna di Diogene	dramma per musica	3 acts	Nicolò Minato	30 January 1674	Vienna, Hofburg	Act 1 lost. With contributions by Leopold I
Le staggioni ossequiose	introduzione d'un balletto	1 act	Nicolò Minato	12 April 1674	Stallburg	
Il ratto delle Sabine	dramma per musica	3 acts	Nicolò Minato	9–10 June 1674	Cortina	Act 1 lost. With contributions by Leopold I
Il trionfatore de' centauri	festa musicale	1 act	Nicolò Minato	13 August 1674	Schönbrunn, zoo	
Il fuoco eterno custodito dalle Vestali	dramma per musica	3 acts	Nicolò Minato	30 October 1674	Cortina	With contributions by Leopold I
La nascita di Minerva	festa musicale	1 act	Nicolò Minato	18 November 1674	Vienna, Hofburg	Music lost
I pazzi Abderiti	dramma per musica	3 acts	Nicolò Minato	23 February 1675	Vienna, Emperor's rooms	With contributions by Leopold I
Pirro	dramma per musica	3 acts	Nicolò Minato	30 May 1675	Laxenburg, zoo	Act 1 lost
Zaleuco (Seleuco)	dramma per musica	3 acts	Nicolò Minato	? 17 June 1675	Vienna, Hofburg	Music lost
Turia Lucretia	dramma per musica	3 acts	Nicolò Minato	18 November 1675	Vienna, Hofburg	Act 3 lost
Sciegliere non potendo adoprare		prologue, 1 act	Nicolò Minato	18 November 1676	Vienna, Hofburg	
Hercole acquistatore dell'immortalità	dramma per musica	3 acts	Nicolò Minato	7 January 1677	Linz, Landhaus	
Chilonida	dramma per musica	3 acts	Nicolò Minato	20 February 1677	Vienna, hall of Archduchess Maria Anna	With contributions by Leopold I
Il silentio di Harpocrate	dramma per musica	3 acts	Nicolò Minato	27 February 1677	Vienna, Hofburg	Music lost
Adriano sul Monte Casio	dramma per musica	3 acts	Nicolò Minato	27 June 1677	Vienna, Hofburg	With contributions by Leopold I
Le maghe di Tessaglia	festa musicale	1 act	Nicolò Minato	22 July 1677	Schönbrunn, park	
Rodogone	dramma per musica	3 acts	Nicolò Minato	18 November 1677	Amalienburg	Act 2 lost
La fortuna delle corti	introduzione d'un balletto	1 act	Anonymous	1677	Stallburg	
La conquista del vello d'oro	festa teatrale	3 acts	Nicolò Minato	8 February 1678	Wiener Neustadt, palace great hall	Act 1 lost
Leucippe Phestia	dramma per musica	3 acts	Nicolò Minato	14 June 1678	Vienna, Hofburg	With contributions by Leopold I
Il tempio di Diana in Taurica	festa musicale	1 act	Nicolò Minato	1 September 1678	Schönbrunn, park	
La monarchia latina trionfante	festa musicale	1 act	Nicolò Minato	8 October 1678	Cortina	Music lost
Enea in Italia	dramma per musica	3 acts	Nicolò Minato	29 October 1678	Wiener Neustadt, palace great hall	Act 2 lost. With contributions by Leopold I
Li favoriti dalla fortuna	festa musicale	1 act	Nicolò Minato	22 November 1678	Vienna, Hofburg	
Baldracca	dramma per musica	3 acts	Nicolò Minato	22 January 1679	Vienna, Hofburg	Act 1 lost
L'ossequio di Flora	introduzione a un balletto di giardinieri	1 act	Nicolò Minato	Carnival 1679	Vienna, Hofburg	
La svogliata	trattenimento musicale	1 act	Nicolò Minato	Carnival 1679	Vienna, Hofburg	
Curzio	dramma per musica	3 acts	Nicolò Minato	10 August 1679	Vienna, Hofburg	Acts 2 and 3 lost. With contributions by Leopold I
I vaticini di Tiresia Tebano	festa musicale	1 act	Nicolò Minato	11 January 1680	Prague, royal ballroom	With contributions by Leopold I
La patienza di Socrate con due mogli	scherzo dramatico per musica	3 acts	Nicolò Minato	29 February 1680	Prague, royal ballroom	With contributions by Leopold I
La forza dell'amicitia	dramma per musica	3 acts	Nicolò Minato	13 February 1681	Linz, palace	Act 1 lost
Temistocle in Persia	dramma per musica	3 acts	Nicolò Minato	30 June 1681	Wiener Neustadt	Acts 1 and 3 lost. With contributions by Leopold I
La rivalità nell'ossequio	trattenimento musicale	1 act	Nicolò Minato	22 July 1681	Schloss Frohsdorf, park	Music lost
Achille in Tessaglia	trattenimento musicale	1 act	Unknown	26 July 1681	Mannersdorf	Music lost
L'albero del ramo d'oro	introduzione d'un ballo	1 act	Nicolò Minato	15 November 1681	Ödenburg	
Gli stratagemi di Biante	dramma per musica	3 acts	Nicolò Minato	15 January 1682	Vienna, Hofburg	With contributions by Leopold I
La Chimera	drama fantastico musicale	3 acts	Nicolò Minato	7 February 1682	Vienna, Hofburg	
Il tempio d'Apollo in Delfo	introduzione d'un balletto	1 act	Nicolò Minato	14 July 1682	Laxenburg	
Il giardino della Virtù		1 act	Nicolò Minato	7 January 1683	Vienna, Emperor's rooms	
Lo smemorato	trattenimento musicale	1 act	Nicolò Minato	28 February 1683	Vienna, Emperor's rooms	
La lira d'Orfeo	trattenimento musicale	1 act	Nicolò Minato	9 June 1683	Laxenburg, park	
Gl'elogii		1 act	Nicolò Minato	16 January 1684	Linz, palace	With contributions by Leopold I
Tullio Hostilio, aprendo il tempio di Giano	festa musicale	1 act	Nicolò Minato	9 June 1684	Linz	Music lost
I varii effetti d'amore	introduzione ad un balletto	1 act	Nicolò Minato	16 January 1685	Vienna, Hofburg	Music lost
La più generosa Spartana	introduzione ad un balletto	1 act	Nicolò Minato	? 10 June 1685	Vienna, Hofburg	
Il Palladio in Roma	dramma per musica	3 acts	Nicolò Minato	17 September 1685	Vienna, Hofburg	With contributions by Leopold I
Il rissarcimento della ruota della Fortuna	introduzione ad un balletto	1 act	Nicolò Minato	? 15 November 1685	Vienna, Hofburg	
Lo studio d'amore	introduzione ad un balletto	1 act	Nicolò Minato	13 January 1686	Vienna, Emperor's rooms	With contributions by Leopold I
Le scioccaggini degli Psilli	trattenimento musicale	1 act	Nicolò Minato	? 24 February 1686	Vienna, Hofburg	
Il nodo gordiano	festa teatrale	1 act	Nicolò Minato	11 June 1686	Vienna, Hofburg	With contributions by Leopold I
Le ninfe ritrose	introduzione d'un balletto	1 act	Nicolò Minato	22 July 1686	Vienna, Hofburg, park	With contributions by Leopold I
Il ritorno di Teseo dal labirinto di Creta	introduzione d'un balletto	1 act	Nicolò Minato	?7 October 1686	Vienna, Hofburg	
La grotta di Vulcano	introduzione d'un balletto	1 act	Nicolò Minato	? 15 November 1686	Vienna, Hofburg	
La vendetta dell'Honestà	rappresentazione musicale	1 act	Nicolò Minato	9 June 1687	Vienna, Hofburg	Music lost
La gemma Ceraunia d'Ulissipone hora Lisbona	dramma musicale	3 acts	Nicolò Minato	1 and 3 July 1687	Heidelberg, Elector's palace	Music lost
La vittoria della Fortezza	introduzione d'un balletto	1 act	Nicolò Minato	22 July 1687	Bellaria	With contributions by Leopold I
La fama addormentata e risvegliata	introduzione d'un balletto	1 act	Nicolò Minato	?19 November 1687	Pressburg	
Il marito ama più	festa musicale	1 act	Nicolò Minato	17 January 1688	Pressburg, Count Pálffy's palace	With contributions by Leopold I
Tanisia	dramma per musica	3 acts	Nicolò Minato	26 February 1688	Vienna, Hofburg	With contributions by Leopold I
La moglie ama meglio	festa musicale	1 act	Nicolò Minato	10 June 1688	Vienna, Hofburg	With contributions by Leopold I
Pigmaleone in Cipro	festa musicale	1 act	Nicolò Minato	13 January 1689	Vienna, Hofburg	With contributions by Leopold I
La Rosaura, overo Amore, figlio della Gratitudine	dramma per musica	3 acts	Ottavio Malvezzi	19 February 1689	Vienna, Hofburg	Act 3 lost. With contributions by Leopold I
Il Telemaco, overo Il valore coronato	composizione per musica	1 act	Ottavio Malvezzi	21 November 1689	Augsburg, Fuggers' house	
La regina de' Volsci	dramma per musica	3 acts	Nicolò Minato	12 January 1690	Augsburg, Fuggers' house	With contributions by Leopold I
Scipione preservatore di Roma	trattenimento musicale	1 act	Nicolò Minato	? 26 July 1690	Vienna, Hofburg	Music lost
La chioma di Berenice	festa musicale	1 act	Nicolò Minato	28 August 1690	Vienna, Hofburg	With contributions by Leopold I
Li tre stati del tempo: passato, presente, e venturo	introduzione d'un balletto	1 act	Nicolò Minato	?June 1691	Neuburg	Music lost
Il ringiovenito	festa musicale	1 act	Nicolò Minato	18 June 1691	Vienna, Favorita	With contributions by Leopold I
Il pellegrinaggio delle Gratie all'Oracolo Dodoneo	invenzione per una serenata	1 act	Nicolò Minato	23 July 1691	Vienna, Favorita park	
Le attioni fortunate di Perseo	festa	4 acts	Nicolò Minato	28 November 1691	Vienna, Hofburg	Music lost
Fedeltà e Generosità	festa teatrale	1 act	Nicolò Minato	12 January 1692	Vienna, Hofburg	With contributions by Leopold I
Le varietà di fortuna in Lucio Iunio Bruto, l'autore della libertà romana	festa per musica	3 acts	Nicolò Minato	18 June 1692	Vienna, Favorita	Acts 1 and 3 lost. With contributions by Leopold I
Il merito uniforma i genii	introduzione d'un balletto	1 act	?Nicolò Minato	22 July 1692	Vienna, Favorita park	Music lost
Il vincitor magnanimo Tito Quintio Flaminio	dramma per musica	3 acts	Nicolò Minato	27 November 1692	Vienna, Hofburg	With contributions by Leopold I
L'amore in sogno, overo Le nozze d'Odati, e Zoriadre	dramma per musica	3 acts	Nicolò Minato	29 June 1693	Vienna, Favorita park	Acts 1 and 3 lost. With contributions by Leopold I
La madre degli dei	festa musicale	1 act	Nicolò Minato	22 July 1693	Vienna, Favorita park	
L'imprese dell'Achille di Roma	festa per musica	4 acts	Anonymous	22 November 1693	Vienna, Hofburg	Music lost
Pelopida Tebano in Tessaglia	festa teatrale	1 act	Nicolò Minato	25 November 1694	Vienna, Hofburg	
L'industrie amorose in Filli di Tracia	dramma per musica	3 acts	Nicolò Minato	16 January 1695	Vienna, Hofburg	With contributions by Leopold I
Amore dà senno, overo Le sciocchezze d'Hippoclide	dramma per musica	3 acts	Donato Cupeda	6–12 February 1695	Vienna, Hofburg	Acts 1 and 2 lost. With contributions by Leopold I
La finta cecità di Antioco il grande	dramma per musica	3 acts	Donato Cupeda	6 July 1695	Vienna, Favorita	Acts 2 and 3 lost. With contributions by Leopold I
La magnanimità di Marco Fabrizio		3 acts	Donato Cupeda	22 November 1695	Vienna, Hofburg	With contributions by Leopold I
Timone misantropo	dramma per musica	3 acts	Anonymous	Carnival 1696	Vienna, Hofburg	Act 1 lost. With contributions by Leopold I
Le piramidi d'Egitto	trattenimento musicale	1 act	Nicolò Minato	6 January 1697	Vienna, Hofburg	
L'Adalberto, overo La forza dell’ astuzia femminile	dramma per musica	3 acts	Donato Cupeda	12 February 1697	Vienna, Hofburg	With contributions by Leopold I
L'amare per virtù	dramma per musica	3 acts	Donato Cupeda	30 June 1697	Vienna, Favorita	Act 2 lost. With contributions by Leopold I
La tirannide abbatuta dalla virtù	festa musicale	1 act	Nicolò Minato	11 August 1697	Vienna, Favorita park	With contributions by Leopold I
L'Arsace, fondatore dell'imperio de' Parthi	dramma per musica	3 acts	Donato Cupeda	3 July 1698	Vienna, Favorita	Acts 1 and 2 lost. Collaboration with Carlo Domenico Draghi
Il delizioso ritiro di Lucullo	festa musicale	1 act	Anonymous	7 August 1698	Vienna, Favorita park	Music lost
La forza dell'amor filiale	dramma per musica	3 acts	Donato Cupeda	27 November 1698	Vienna, Hofburg	Act 3 lost. Collaboration with Carlo Domenico Draghi. With contributions by Leopold I
Le finezze dell'amicizia, e dell'amore	festa musicale	1 act	Anonymous	1 August 1699	Vienna, Hofburg	Music lost
L'Alceste	dramma per musica	3 acts	Donato Cupeda	28 January 1700	Vienna, Hofburg	Music lost
