= Ilario Spolverini =

Italian painter (1657–1734)

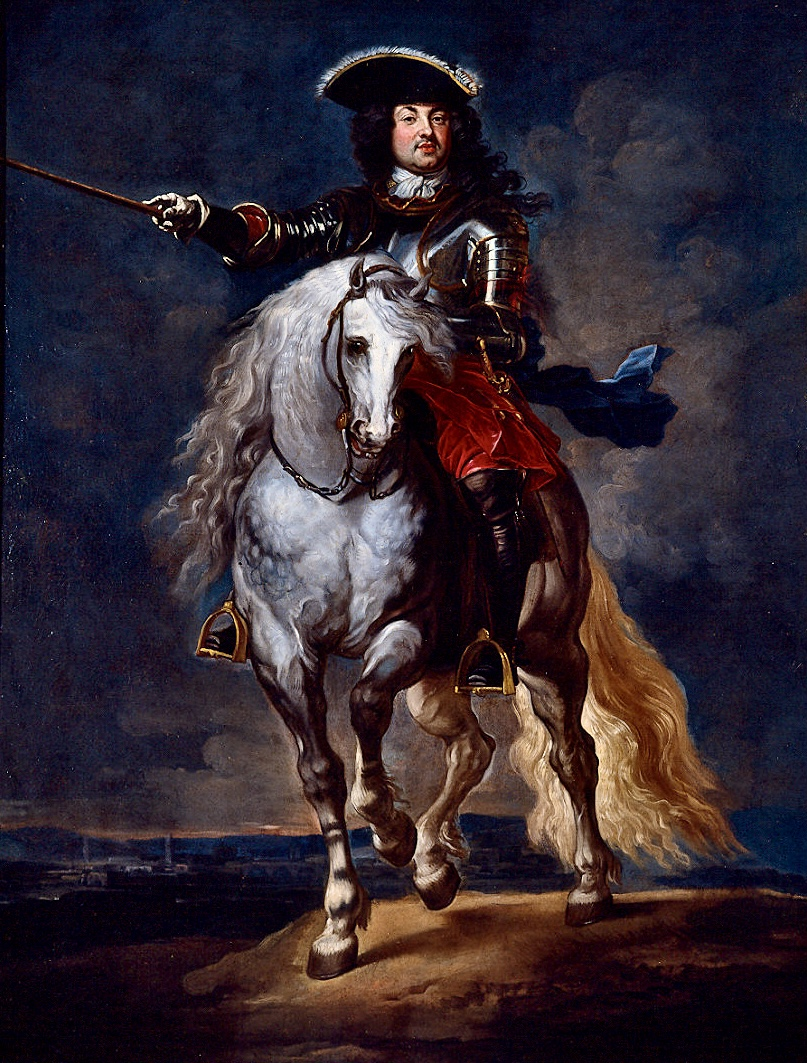
Antonio Farnese, Duke of Parma on horseback (Galleria nazionale di Parma)

Ilario Spolverini (13 January 1657 – 4 August 1734), known as Spolverini, was an Italian painter.

== Biography ==
Spolverini was born in Parma. The influence of Mercanti’s master Francesco Monti, known as Brescianino, is evident in his choice of subjects, including the battles, knights and scenes characterised by movement. After a trip to Venice together with Brescianino, his painting displayed a new approach to colour that made it fully original. His work for various noble families in the area of Parma and Piacenza included a series of paintings celebrating the deeds of the Farnese dynasty, commissioned by the family in 1714 and repeated three times for residences in Parma, Piacenza and Colorno.

Spolverini painted battle scenes for the Duke. His religious artwork was placed in the Certosa and the Cathedral of Parma. Among the pupils were Francesco Simonini, Antonio Fratacci, Clemente Ruta and Giuseppe Peroni. He died in Piacenza.

== Other projects ==
Media related to Ilario Spolverini at Wikimedia Commons
