= Le Roncole =

Village in Italy

Roncole Verdi
- Frazione
- Location of Roncole Verdi in Italy
- Coordinates: 44°57′09″N 10°04′20″E
- Country: Italy
- Region: Emilia-Romagna
- Province: Parma (PR)
- Comune: Busseto
- Elevation: 40 m (130 ft)

Population (2010)
  - Total: 382
- Time zone: UTC+1 (CET)
  - Summer (DST): UTC+2 (CEST)
- Postal code: 43010
- Dialing code: 0524

Le Roncole (until 1963; today known as Roncole Verdi) is a village in the province of Parma (Emilia-Romagna region) of Italy, a frazione of the comune of Busseto. It is located 140 km southeast of Milan.

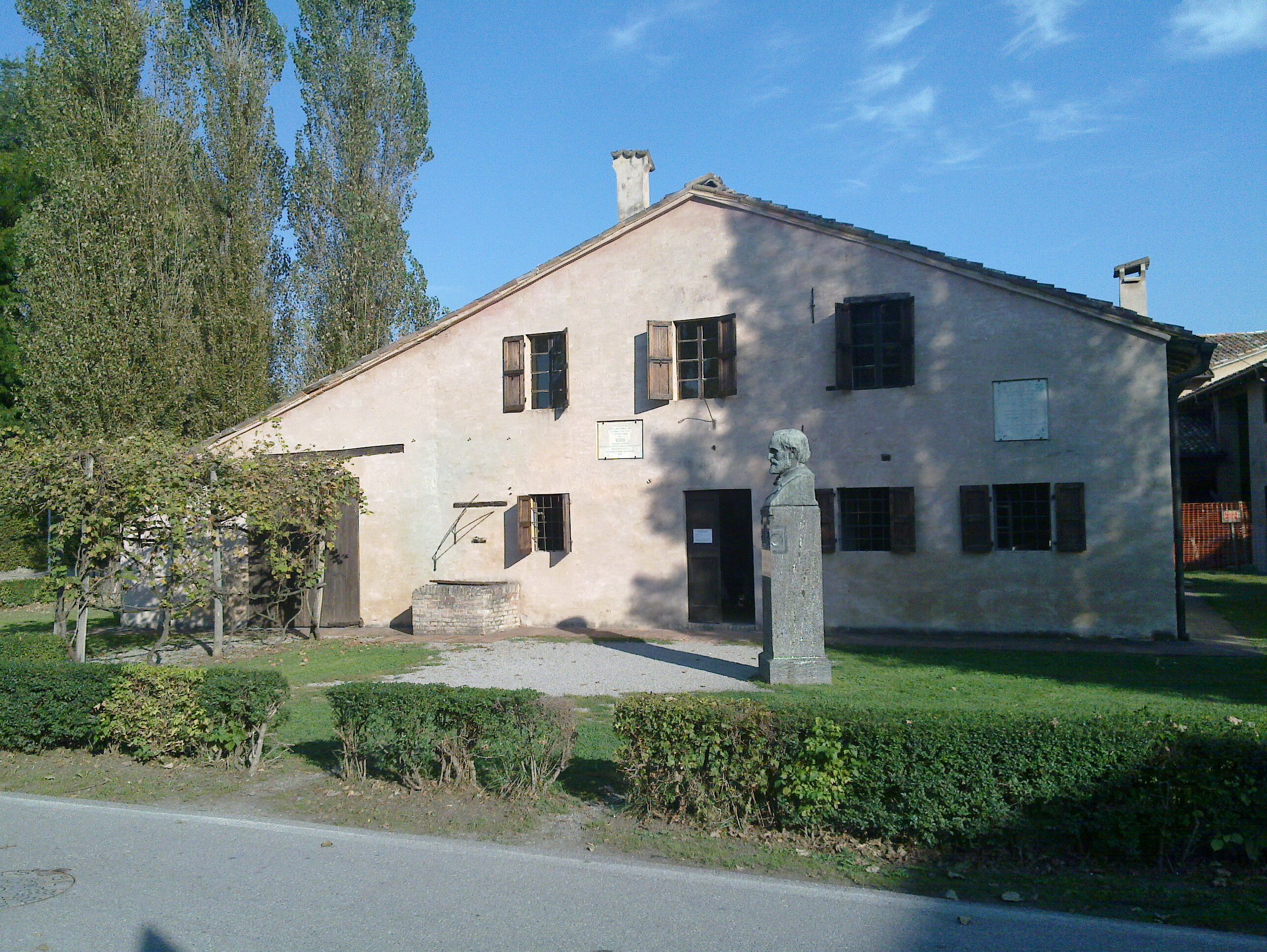
The birthplace of Giuseppe Verdi

It is best known as the birthplace on the 9th or 10th of October 1813 of opera composer Giuseppe Verdi. He retained a residence in the area almost his entire life, and wrote to Count Opprandino Arrivabene in 1863 from Paris where it had been rumoured that he was intending to live in France: "I was, am and always will be a peasant from Roncole." The house has been a national monument since 1901.

The composer's birthplace, the "Casa Natale del Maestro", can be visited, as can the organ used by the young Verdi in the church of Santuario della Madonna dei Prati a few kilometers away.
