= Giovanni Battista Tagliasacchi =

Italian painter

Giovanni Battista Tagliasacchi (26 August 1697 – 3 December 1737) was an Italian painter of the late-Baroque period.

Tagliasacchi was born at Borgo San Donnino. For some time he painted historical scenes in the manner of his teacher Giovanni Gioseffo dal Sole. He was also an excellent portrait painter. He was mainly active in Piacenza. Some of his works were painted for San Pietro, Piacenza.
