= Giuseppe Natali =

Italian painter (1652–1722)

Giuseppe Natali (1652–1722) was an Italian painter of the Baroque period and active mainly in Cremona and Lombardy.

== Biography ==
He was born in Casalmaggiore, near Cremona. He was the son of a Giovanni Battista Natali (Bologna, c 1630 - Cremona, c 1700) and grandson of Carlo Natali (il Guardolino), and pupil of Pietro da Cortona in Rome. He later returned to work in Cremona.

He became a noted painter of quadratura, and received his first training locally from Girolamo Pellizoni Crescini. Natali was influenced by painters of this genre in Rome and Bologna, including Girolamo Curti, Angelo Michele Colonna, and Agostino Mitelli. His brothers Francesco, Lorenzo, and Pietro were assistants in his studio. He had a son and nephew, named Giovanni Battista Natali, both painters.

Among his works in Cremona, are frescoes for the following sites:

- Chapel of St Catherine in Church of San Domenico
- Parish church of Sant'Andrea
- St Andrew Crucified altar church of San Pietro al Po
- Presbytery of San Sigismondo
- Church of San Domenico at the porta delle Beccarie vecchie
- Chapel in Church of San Imerio
- Church of San Sigismondo
- Church of San Francesco: altarpiece
