= Antoninus of Piacenza =

Patron saint of Piacenza

Saint Antoninus of Piacenza
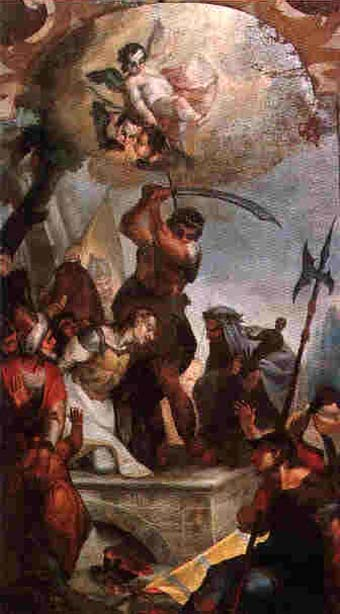

Martyr
- Died: AD 303; Piacenza or Travo
- Venerated in: Roman Catholic Church
- Canonized: Pre-Congregation
- Feast: September 30
- Patronage: Piacenza

Saint Antoninus of Piacenza (or Placentia) (died AD 303), also known as Antoninus Placentinus, is a patron saint of Piacenza in Italy. He is venerated as a saint and martyr in the Roman Catholic Church, with a feast day of 30 September.

The saint was said to have been martyred at Piacenza or Travo, in the AD 303 Diocletianic Persecution. He appears in Victricius' De Laude Sanctorum of the same century, and the somewhat later Martyrologium Hieronymianum. Sabinus of Piacenza established his sanctuary, following a rediscovery of the relics. A later tradition made him a member of the legendary Theban Legion. Piacenza's Basilica di Sant'Antonino bears his name.
