= Giuseppe Turbini =

Italian painter

Giuseppe Turbini (1702 in Piacenza – 1788 in Piacenza) was an Italian painter, specializing in quadratura.

He trained under his father, the painter Pietro Turbini. He was active in the decoration of the church of Santa Teresa di Carmelo in Piacenza.
