= Clemente Ruta =

Italian painter (1668-1767)

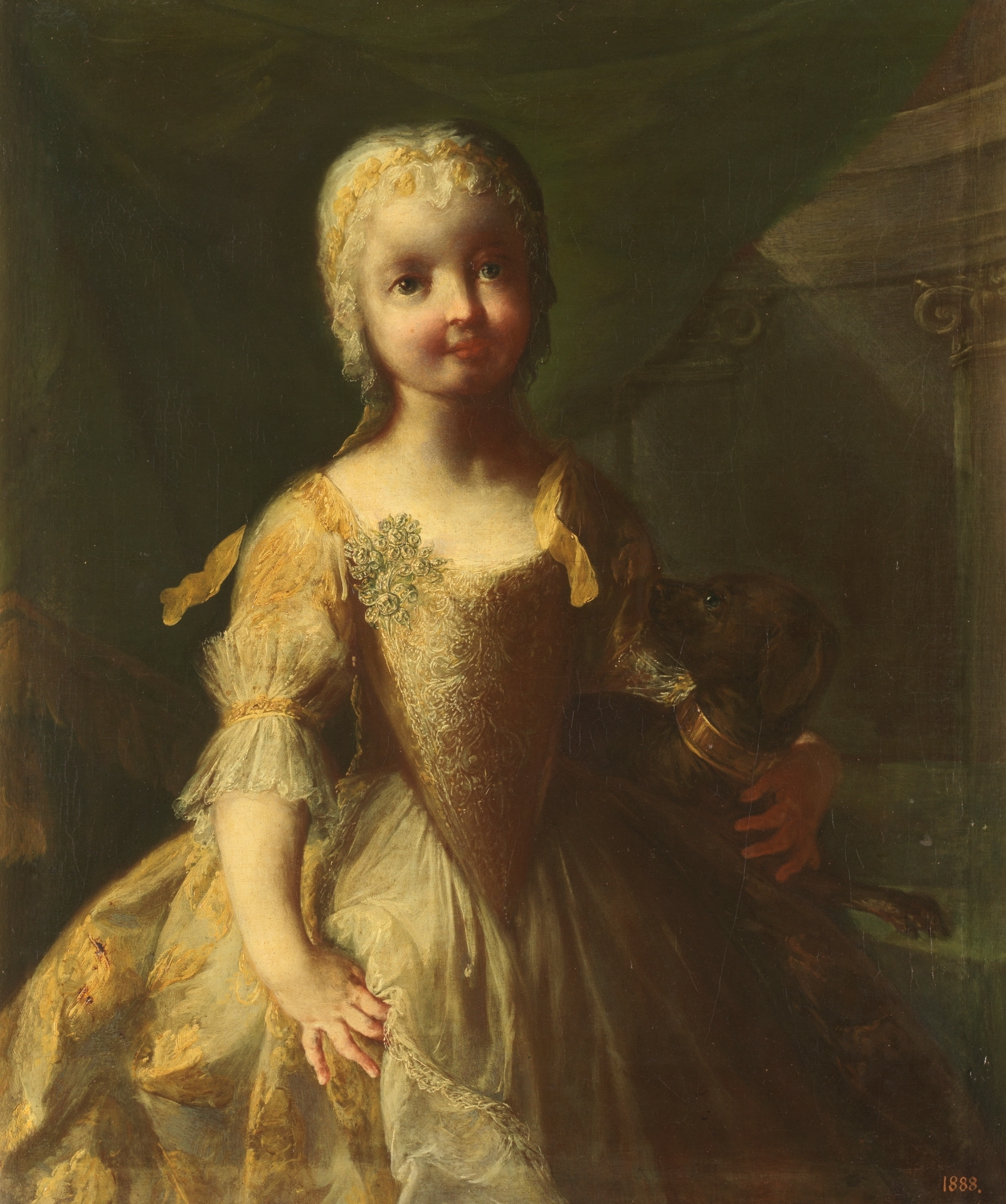
Infanta Maria Isabel, Museo del Prado

Clemente Ruta (9 May 1668 – 11 November 1767) was an Italian painter of the late-Baroque period.

== Biography ==
Born at Parma, Duchy of Parma and Piacenza, he first trained with the painter Ilario Spolverini, then later in Bologna with Carlo Cignani. He moved with the latter to Naples to work in the court of Charles of Bourbon. Ruta became blind in older life. He specialized in landscapes with pen and watercolour.
