= Pietro Francesco Ferrante =

Italian painter

Pietro Francesco Ferranti, also known as cavalier Ferrante (ca. 1612 – 1681), was an Italian painter of the Baroque period.

== Biography ==
He was born in Bologna. He was apparently a pupil of Giovanni Francesco Gessi. Other sources attribute him a pupil of Guido Reni. He painted a St Paul calms the Storm (1642) for the choir of San Paolo Maggiore, Bologna. A fresco depicting the Miracle of St Anthony of Padua painted under the portico of San Francesco in Bologna is attributed to Ferrante. he worked in Piacenza in 1644, where he painted some frescoed angels for the church of Santa Maria Maddalena delle Convertite, and a Virgin with Saints Carlo, Andrea, Teresa, Elizabeth, as well as a donor for the church of Sant'Antonino. Some sources attribute his death as early as 1653 or as late as 1676. Some sources say he died in Sicily.
