= Busseto =

- Comune
- Comune di Busseto
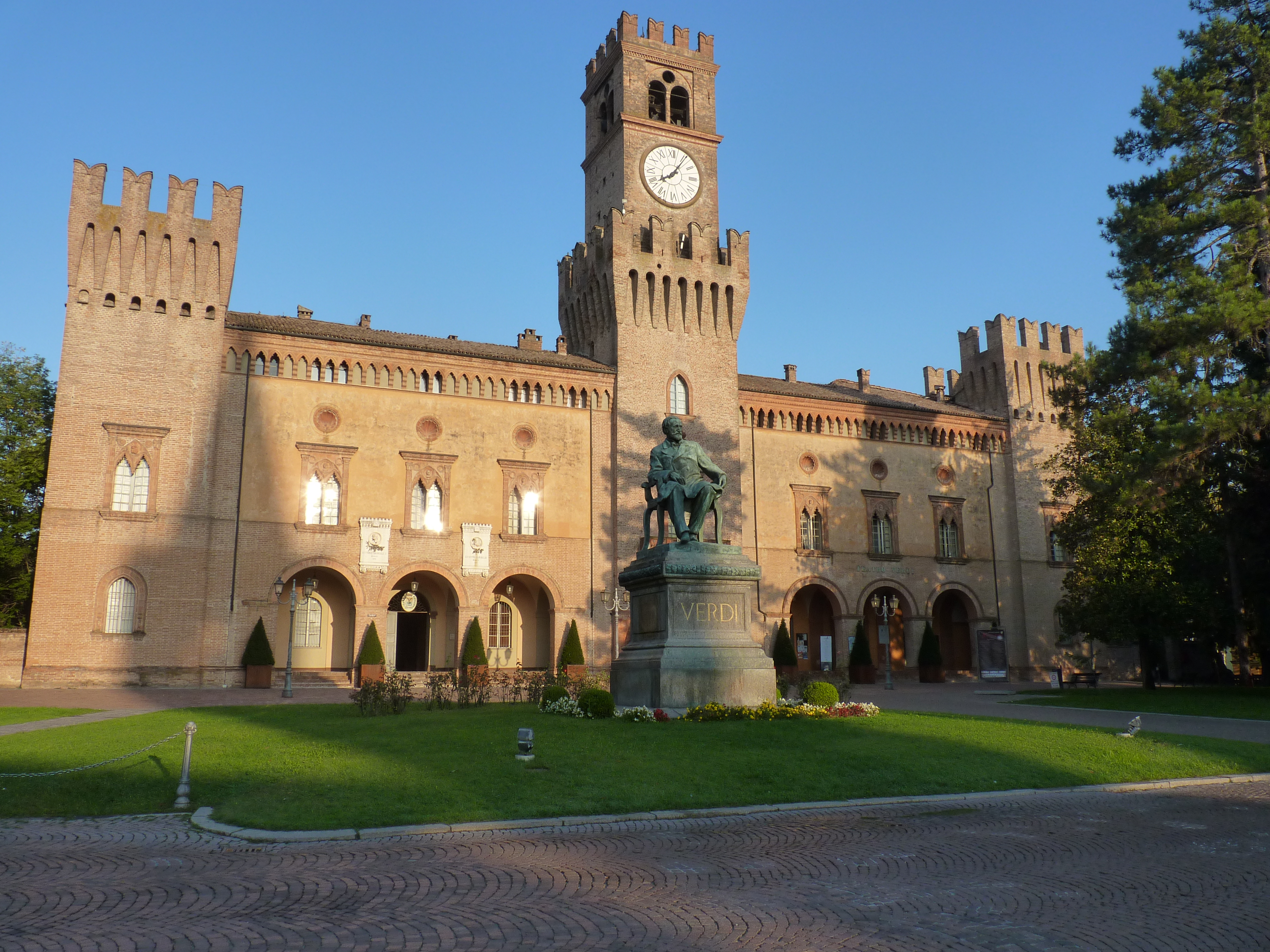
- The Rocca Pallavicino in Busseto

- Coat of arms

- Location within Italy Location within Emilia-Romagna
- Coordinates: 44°58′51″N 10°02′33″E
- Country: Italy
- Region: Emilia-Romagna
- Province: Parma (PR)
- Frazioni: Contrada della Chiesa, Frescarolo, Madonna Prati, Le Roncole, Samboseto, San Rocco, Sant'Andrea, Semoriva, Spigarolo

Government
  - Mayor: Maria Giovanna Gambazza

Area
  - Total: 76 km^{2} (29 sq mi)

Population (1 January 2023)demographic balance; demographic balance
  - Total: 6,763
  - Density: 89/km^{2} (230/sq mi)
- Demonym: Bussetani
- Time zone: UTC+1 (CET)
  - Summer (DST): UTC+2 (CEST)
- Postal code: 43011
- Dialing code: 0524
- Website: Official website

Busseto (Bussetano: Büsé; Parmigiano: Busèjj) is a comune in the province of Parma, in Emilia-Romagna in Northern Italy with about 6,763 inhabitants. Its history is quite well documented back to the 10th century, and for almost five hundred years it was the capital of Stato Pallavicino, which eventually became part of the Duchy of Parma. The town is about 8 kilometres (5.0 mi) south of Cremona in Lombardy.

== Etymology ==
The first written sources give the name as "Buxetum" in the early twelfth century. As such it appears the town's name is cognate with:

- buxus as in common box, buxus sempervirens, cognate with places such as Bushey; or
- busetum – a shott, fold or pen (fenced clearing) for oxen, cognate with places such as Oxpens.

== Municipal palace and galleried theatre ==
The town hosts La Rocca, on the site of the founding fortress of Adalberto Pallavicini, scion of his family, in the eleventh century. In the first half of the thirteenth century, it was laid out afresh to figure a moat and a drawbridge facing the square. Successive damage which lost the drawbridge and parts of the walls was followed by alterations and partial rebuilding. In 1857 its bulk was rebuilt almost entirely in neo-Gothic style – under theatre architect Pier Luigi Montecchini (b.1822, d. 1887). Its present form has preserved the 13th century keep and the main tower. La Rocca, within which lies the Teatro Verdi, it is now the Municipal Palace, the seat of the municipality of Busseto.

== Notable residents ==
Opera composer Giuseppe Verdi was born in the nearby village of Le Roncole in 1813 and he moved to the town in 1824. Other figures from the world of opera are associated with the town: until his death, retired tenor Carlo Bergonzi owned the hotel I due Foscari, which also hosts the Accademia Verdiana. Bass-baritone Luca Pisaroni grew up there from the age of four after his family moved to Busseto in 1979, where his father owned a car-repair firm and his mother was a teacher. It was in that town where, he noted, "you feel Verdi's spirit all over the place!" and where his love of opera began. Italian journalist Giovannino Guareschi also lived in Le Roncole, and his Mondo Piccolo is set there.

Doctor Claudio Carosino was born in Busseto. The hospital in Busseto is named after him.

== Main sites associated with Giuseppe Verdi ==
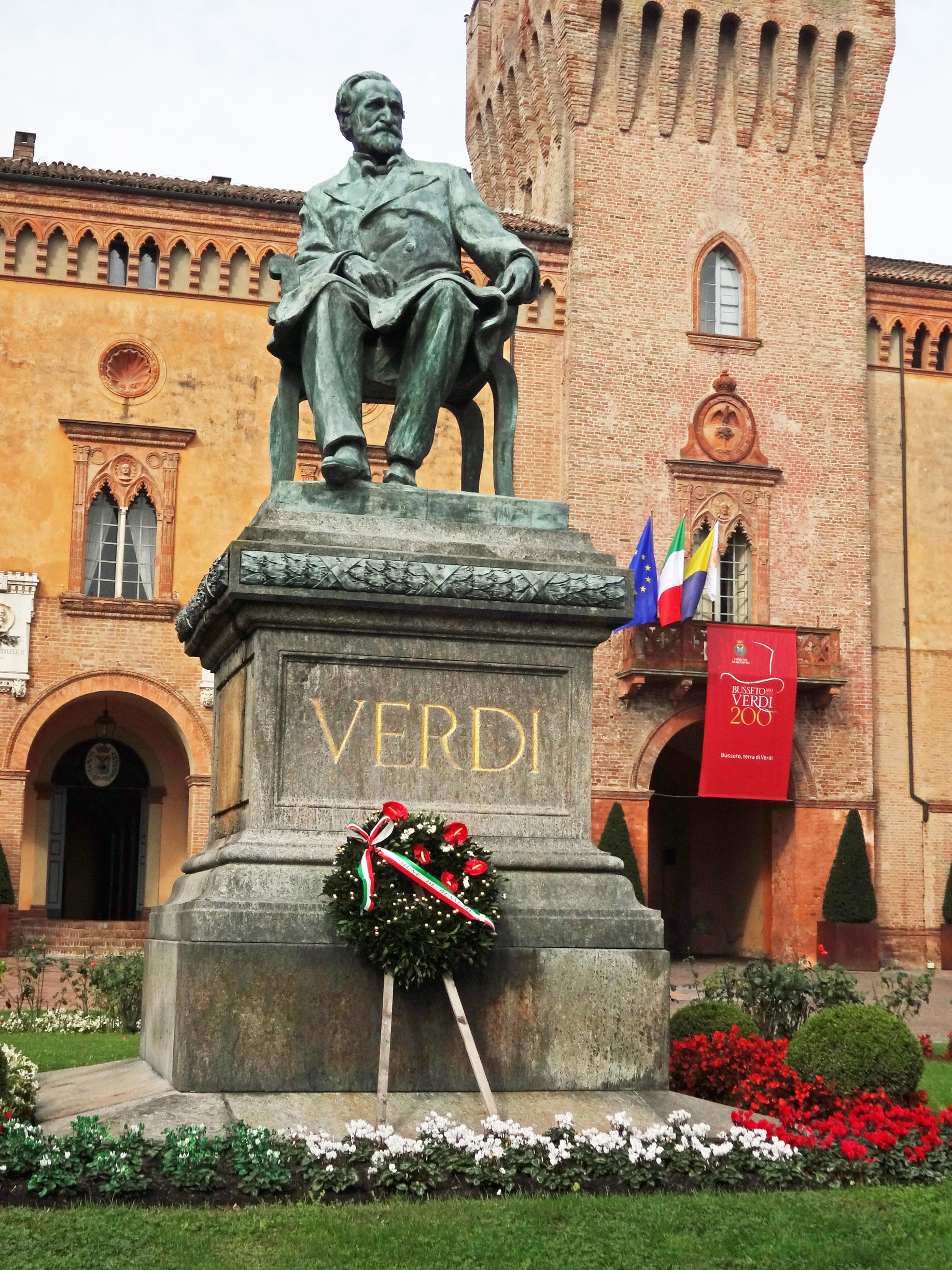
Statue of Giuseppe Verdi in Busseto on 200th anniversary of his birth, 10 October 2013

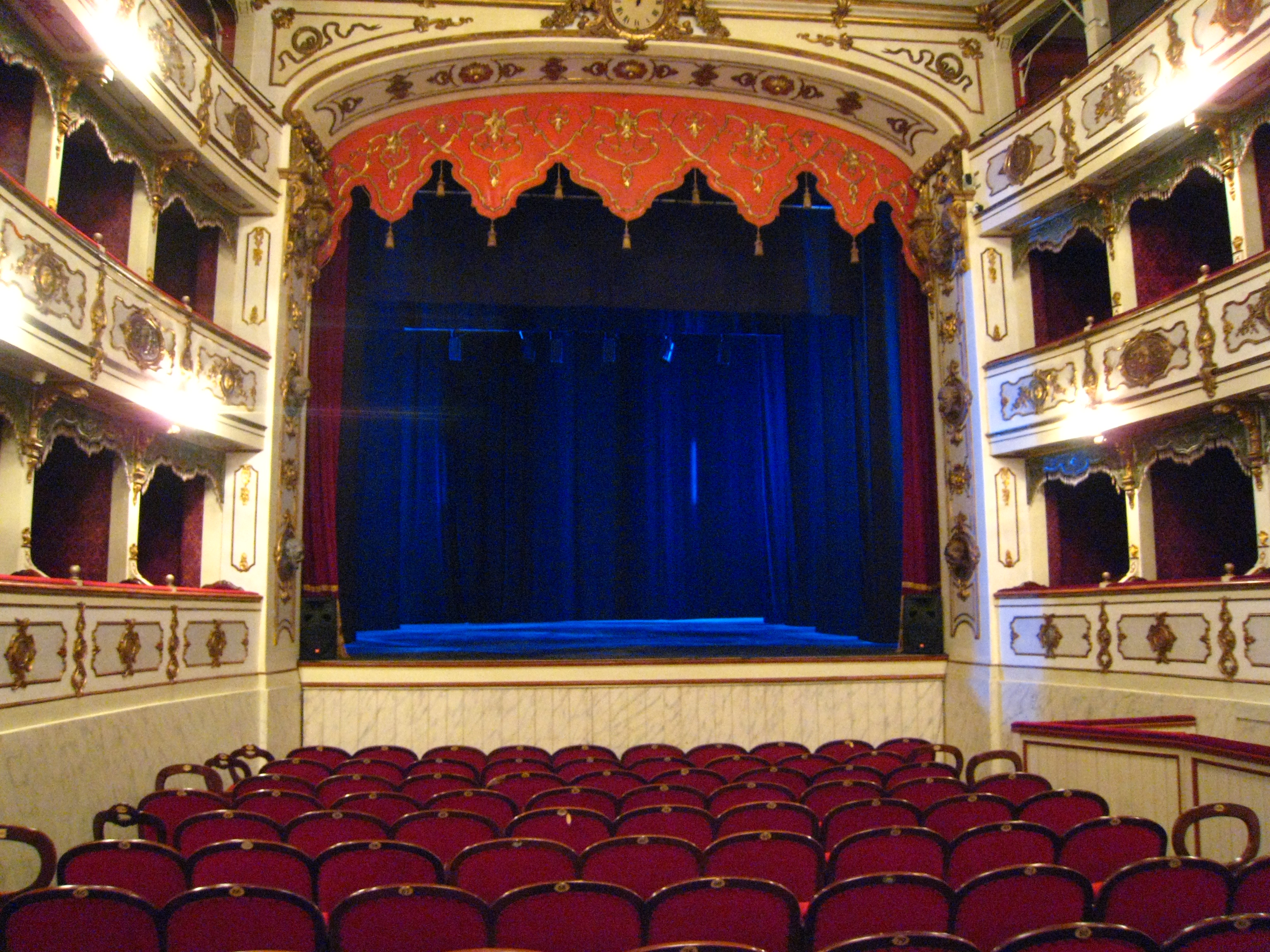
Teatro Verdi interior

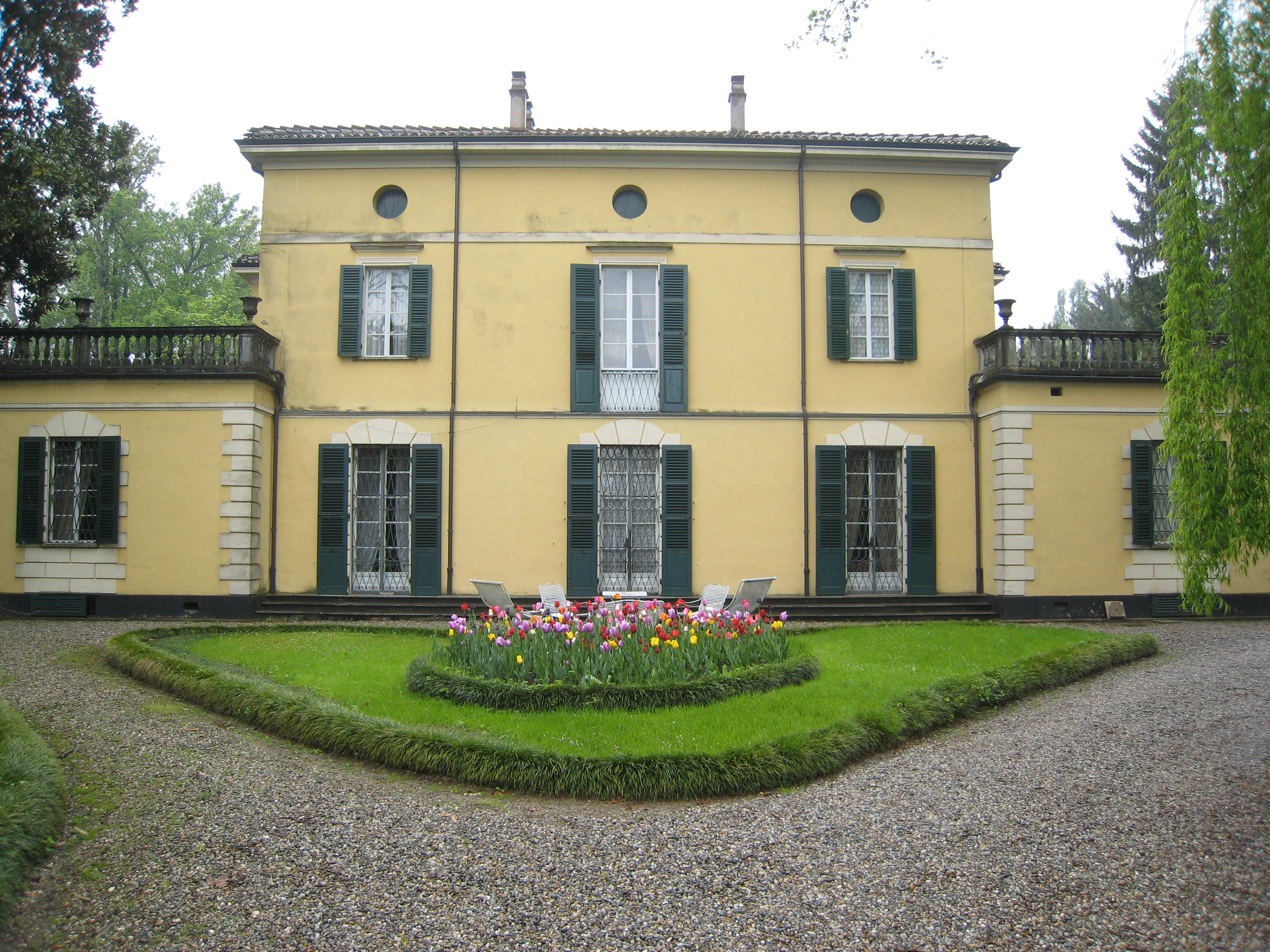
Verdi's house at Sant'Agata

In the town and locally many sites linked to the life of Verdi can be visited. These include:

=== Le Roncole ===
The nearby village of Le Roncole was Verdi's birthplace on 10 October 1813. The house has been a national monument since 1901.

=== Casa Barezzi ===
Close by the main square is the home of Antonio Barezzi, the man who supported his early endeavours. He became Verdi's patron and his father-in-law. In the upstairs lounge, the young Verdi gave his first public performance in 1830 and continued to frequent the house until the death of his benefactor.

The first portrait of Verdi and an oil depicting Antonio are on display in the house. Verdi's letters are displayed. This house is the headquarters of the Friends of Verdi; the organization oversaw the restoration of the building in 1979 and 1998. Since 2001, there has been a permanent exhibition of objects and documents related to Verdi and his relationship to the Barezzis.

=== Busseto churches where Verdi played the organ ===
These two of Busseto's ten churches (chiese) were where Verdi played the organ. Santa Maria degli Angeli has its own article as does San_Michele_Arcangelo, Busseto.

=== Palazzo Orlandi ===
This is the large, ornate house which Verdi bought in 1845. He lived there with Giuseppina Strepponi, not yet his wife, from 1849 to 1851. Verdi composed Luisa Miller, Stiffelio and Rigoletto while living there.

=== Teatro Giuseppe Verdi ===
The Teatro Giuseppe Verdi is a small 300-seat theatre built by the municipality without Verdi's prior approval however he donated towards its completion.

=== National Giuseppe Verdi Museum ===
The National Giuseppe Verdi Museum is housed at the Renaissance Villa Pallavicino; it was inaugurated on 10, October 2009, the 196th anniversary of the composer's birth.

=== Villa Verdi ===
In the nearby village of Sant'Agata, in the province of Piacenza, is the Villa Verdi, the house which he commissioned in 1848 while living in Busseto and where his parents lived until 1851, after which it became Verdi's main home for the rest of his life. He lived there less frequently after the death of his wife, Giuseppina, in 1897.

== Transportation ==
Busseto has a railway station on the Cremona–Fidenza line.

== Sister cities ==
- Carry-le-Rouet, Bouches-du-Rhône, France

Friendship city: Sarasota, Florida, US

== See also ==
- San Bartolomeo, Busseto
- Sant'Ignazio, Busseto
