= Giovanni Battista Natali =

Italian painter (1698–1768)

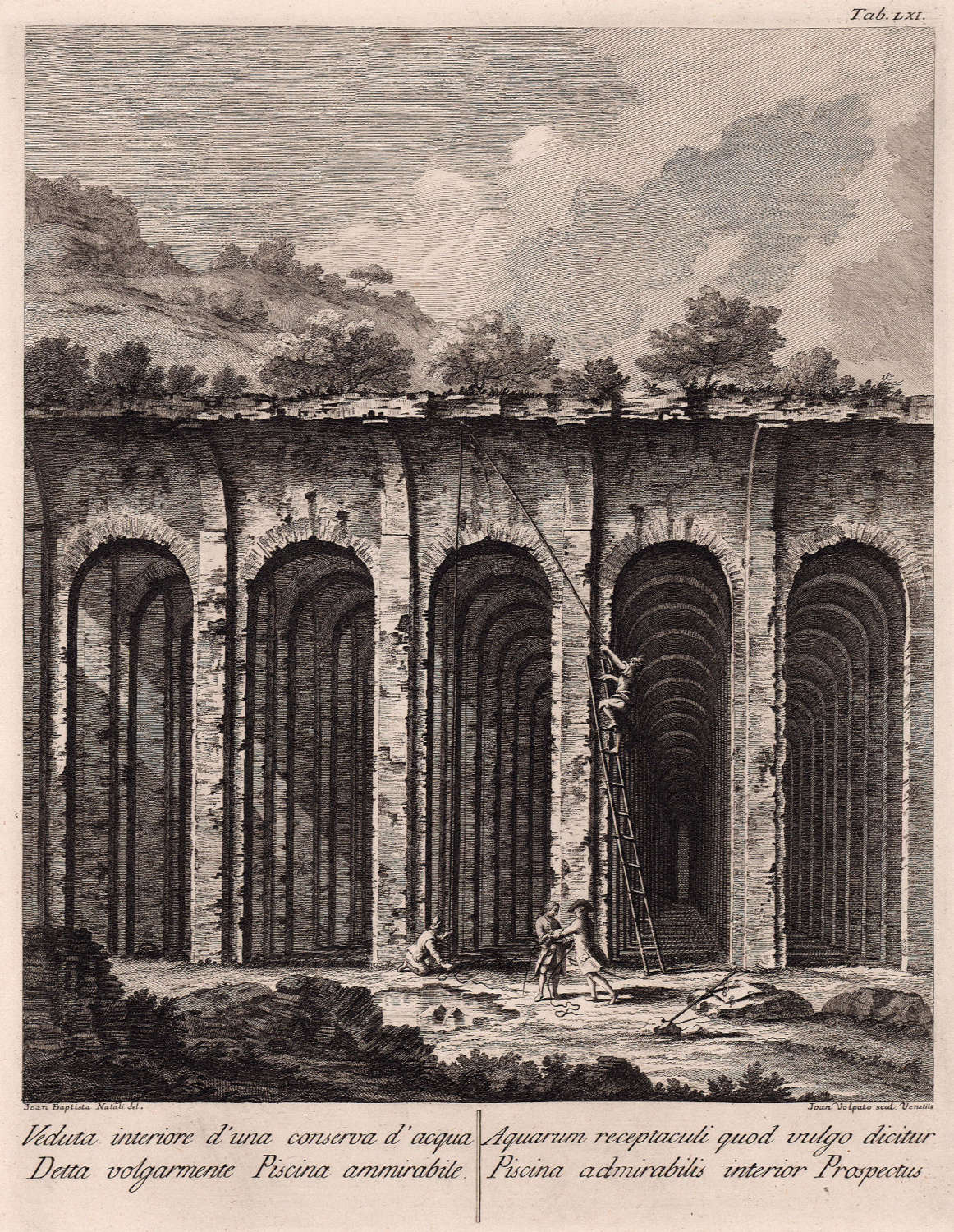
Engraving of a drawing of the Piscina Mirabilis, a Roman Cistern located in Bacoli (IT), near the ancient Roman port of Misenum. Signed: Joan. Baptista Natali del. & Joan. Volpato, scul. Venetiis, 1768

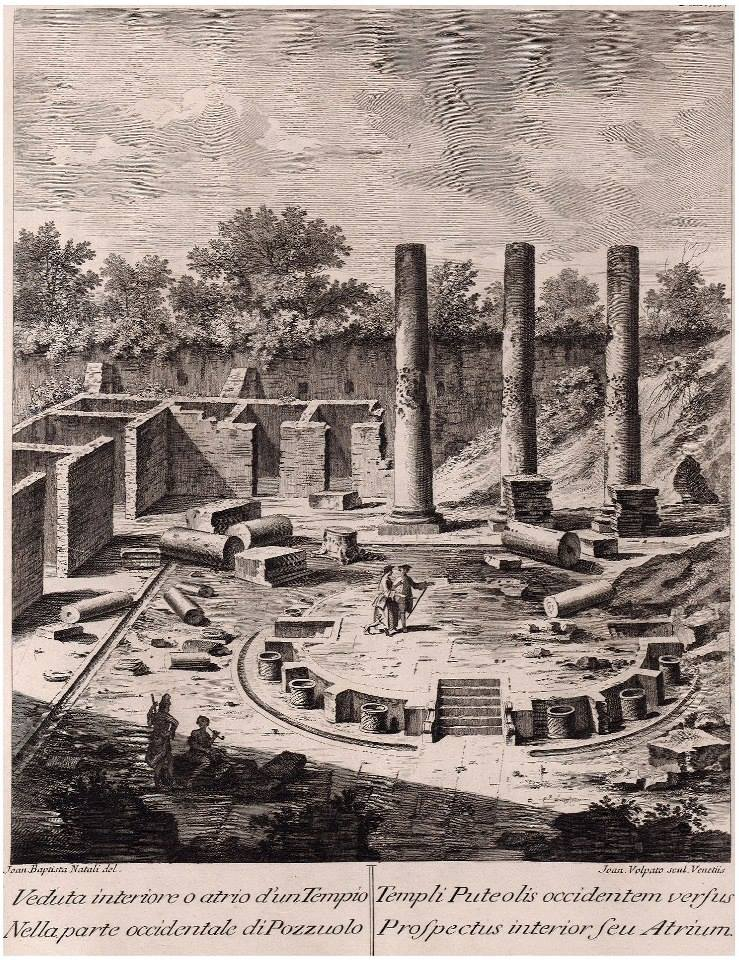
Engraving of a drawing of the Macellum of Pozzuoli (IT). Signed: Joan. Baptista Natali del. & Joan. Volpato, scul. Venetiis, 1768

Giovanni Battista Natali, also known as Joan(nes) or Ioannes Baptista Natali (Pontremoli, 1698 – Piacenza, 1768), was an Italian painter and draughtsman of the late-Baroque period, active in Parma and Piacenza, but also Savona, Lucca, and Naples, and finally Genoa in 1736.

Filippo De Boni (or De Bòni) lists four artists with this same name, who are perhaps different from the above.

1. GB Natali (Bologna, c. 1630 – Cremona, c. 1700), son of Carlo Natali (il Guardolino), and pupil of Pietro da Cortona in Rome, returned to work in Cremona. Giovanni Battista was father of Giuseppe Natali (1652–1725).
2. GB Natali, son of Francesco Natali (c. 1654) of Casalmaggiore was a painter for King Charles III of Sicily and his successor.
3. GB Natali was an engraver in woodcuts, a disciple of Ludovico Carracci.
4. GB Natali, son of Giuseppe Natali, the brother of Francesco and cousin of GB above, painted for the court of Saxony.

Oxford Art Online also lists four artists with this same name, among other Natali family members, with the following descriptions:

1. Natali, Giovanni Battista : Italian, 17th century, male. Sculptor (wood). Giovanni Battista Natali was a pupil of Lodovico Carracci, and was also an architect. He sculpted the stalls in S. Giacomo della Certosa before 1650.
2. Natali, Giovanni Battista I : Italian, 17th century, male. Born c. 1630, in Cremona; died June 1696, in Rome. Painter, engraver. Murals. Giovanni Battista Natali I was the son of Carlo Natali. He was his father's pupil at first, before going to Rome, where he worked in the studio of Pietro da Cortona. Later, he returned to Cremona and worked for several churches. He had a great many pupils. His works include a large decorative painting adorned with architectural motifs in the church of the Predicatori.
3. Natali, Giovanni Battista II : Italian, 18th century, male. Active during the first half of the 18th century. Painter. Giovanni Battista Natali II was the son of Giuseppe Natali. In 1730, he was a painter to the court of the elector of Cologne. Museum and Gallery Holdings Oberschleißheim (Neues Schloss Schleißheim, Staatsgal.): Battles ( two paintings )
4. Natali, Giovanni Battista III, called Piacentino : Italian, 18th century, male. Born 14 October 1698, in Pontremoli; died 10 November 1765, in Cremona. Painter, fresco artist, engraver. Religious subjects, landscapes, architectural views. Giovanni Battista Natali III was the son of Francesco Natali and a pupil and assistant of Sebastiano Galeotti. He was a painter to the court of Naples, and executed frescoes and altar paintings in the churches of Naples and Pontremoli. He also engraved 45 views of the ruins of Pozzuoli and Baiae.

It is very likely that the 45 views mentioned under 4. above originate from a bilingual book (Latin and Italian) by Paolo Antonio Paoli, president of the Pontifical Ecclesiastical Academy in Rome (1775–1798), treating the subject of the "Remains of the Antiquities Existing in Pozzuoli, Cumae, and Baiae", published in 1768 in Naples. ^{[see Sources below]}

A number of plates showing different views (in Italian: s. Veduta, pl. Vedute) of ruins from Antiquity^{(see inserted images of engravings on the right)} are signed by Joan. Baptista Natali, del(in). (draughtsman), & Joan. Volpato, sculpt. Venetiis, who was the engraver. This is strong evidence that Giovanni Battista Natali III (Piacentino) was also known under the name Joan. or Ioann. Baptista Natali, a Latinised name no doubt, further corroborated by sources from the Library of Congress (LOC), USA and the German Archaeological Institute (DAI).

The Metropolitan Museum of Art possesses a set of drawings by an Italian artist named Giovanni Battista Natali III (Pontremoli, Tuscany, 1698 – Naples, 1765). Oddly enough the same place and date of birth, but a different place of death as under 4. above.^{[ambiguity calls for further investigations]}

== Sources ==
- De Boni, Filippo (1852). Biografia degli artisti ovvero dizionario della vita e delle opere dei pittori, degli scultori, degli intagliatori, dei tipografi e dei musici di ogni nazione che fiorirono da'tempi più remoti sino á nostri giorni [Biography of artists or dictionary of the lives and works of painters, sculptors, carvers, printers and musicians of every nation who flourished from the earliest times to the present day.] (in Italian) (2nd ed.). Venezia: Presso Andrea Santini e Figlio. pp. 698–699.
- Soprani, Raffaello; Ratti, Carlo Giuseppe (1769). Delle vite de' pittori, scultori, ed architetti genovesi - Tomo secundo scritto da Carlo Giuseppe Ratti in continuazione dell'opera di Raffaello Soprani [The Lives of Genovese Painters, Sculptors and Architects - Second Volume written by Carlo Giuseppe Ratti in continuation of the work of Raffaello Soprani] (in Italian). Vol. II. Genoa: Stamperia Casamara. pp. 370–371.
- Paoli, Paolo Antonio. (1768). Antiquitatum Puteolis Cumis Baiis Existentium Reliquiae. Avanzi delle antichità esistenti a Pozzuoli, Cuma e Baja. [Remains of the Antiquities Existing in Pozzuoli, Cumae, and Baiae]. Napoli: [s.n.], Anno A.C.N.MDCCLXVIII ^{(with full book scan available at German Archaeological Institute (iDAI) )}, a.o. bilingual texts (35 Folia) and 96 engravings, of which 28 were signed by Natali, delin.
