= Giovanni Evangelista Draghi =

Italian painter (1654–1712)

Giovanni Evangelista Draghi (1654–1712) was an Italian painter of the late-Baroque or Rococo period. Luigi Lanzi erroneously refers to him as Giovanni Battista Draghi, who should not be confused with the composer of the same name.

== Biography ==
Born in Genoa, Draghi was a scholar of Domenico Piola, active in Parma and even more in Piacenza. In Piacenza, he painted a Death of St James for the church of San Francesco; a St Agnes for the Duomo; a San Lorenzo for the homonymous church, the nave frescoes for San Vincenzo, and a Religious Orders receiving their regulations from St Augustine for San Agostino. He also painted in the palace Pallavicino Palace in Busseto.

Draghi was one of the painters who was commissioned canvases for the i Fasti Farnesiano found in the Palazzo Farnese of Piacenza. The cycles of canvases for the residence depict historical events involving the Farnese family. Sebastiano Ricci and Domenico Piola were among the other artists in the first series (1685–1687), depicting the history of Alessandro Farnese, were completed for Ranuccio II. The canvases were taken to Naples by Carlo di Borbone in 1734, and some returned to be exhibited in situ at Piacenza in 1928.

Draghi died in Piacenza.
