= Giovanni Battista Draghi (composer) =

Italian composer

Giovanni Battista Draghi (ca. 1640 – buried 13 May 1708) was an Anglo-Italian composer and keyboard player. He may have been the brother of the composer Antonio Draghi.

Draghi was brought to London in the 1660s by King Charles II who was trying, unsuccessfully, to establish Italian opera in England. He remained in England for the rest of his life.

In 1673, Draghi was made first organist of the queen's Catholic chapel in Somerset House. In 1684, he took part in what became known as the Battle of the Organs. He was hired by master organ maker Renatus Harris to demonstrate the superiority of his organ when Harris was trying to gain the contract to build the new organ for the Temple Church. Harris' rival "Father" Bernard Smith hired organists and composers John Blow and Henry Purcell to demonstrate his organ and won the contest.

Draghi was awarded a pension by King William III in 1698.
