= Robert de Longe =

Italian painter

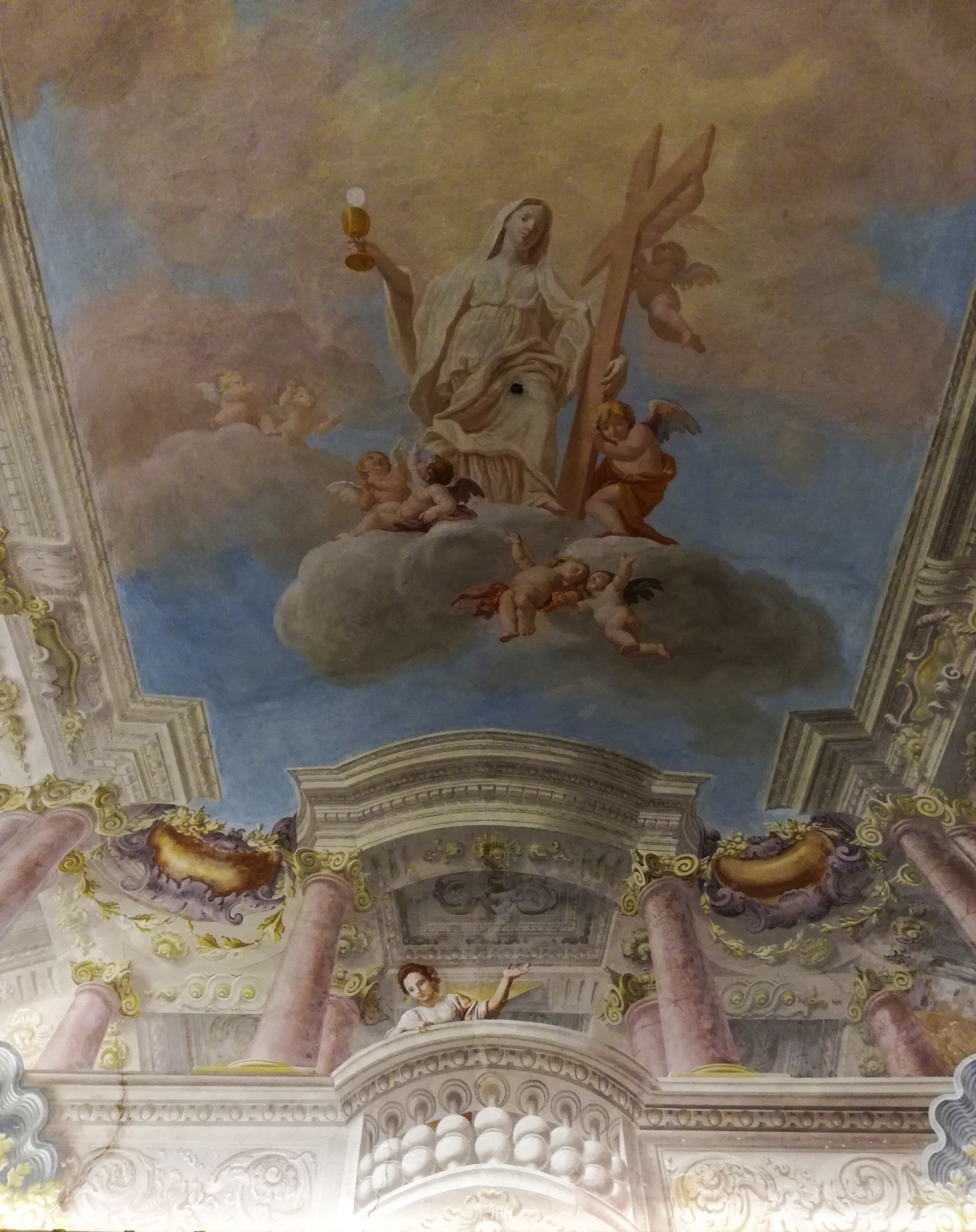
Illusionistic ceiling fresco in the Palazzo Barni, Lodi

Robert de Longe (Brussels, 1646 – Piacenza, 1709) was a Flemish Baroque painter who after training in Brussels, spent most of his artistic career in Northern Italy including Cremona and Piacenza. He studied fresco painting in Italy and became a prolific contributor to local churches.

== Life ==
He was born as the son of Maerten de Longe and baptised in Brussels on 30 March 1646. He was in 1658 enrolled at the Brussels painters' guild as a pupil of Jacob de Potter. After completing his training he spent some time traveling through the Low Countries, Germany, France and England (1666) before settling in Italy.

He is one of many painters known in Italy as il Fiammingo ('the Fleming'). De Longe first arrived in Rome in 1680. He worked as a painter for the Papal court and met Agostino Bonisoli, who invited him to work in Cremona. In 1685, de Longe was invited by the bishop of Piacenza, Giorgio Barni, to work in that city. While a Flemish influence in his work is noticeable, during his stay in Italy, he was influenced by works of Sebastiano Ricci and Giovanni Evangelista Draghi, such as their Fasti paintings in the Palazzo Farnese in Piacenza. He is said to have influenced “Cavalier Tempesta”. One of his masterworks is considered the cupola (1705) of the Oratory of San Giovanni in Cortemaggiore. He also painted the interior of the dome of the church of Santa Brigida, Piacenza.
