= Castelvetro =

Castelvetro may refer to:

- Lodovico Castelvetro (1505–1571), Italian writer and humanist
- Giacomo Castelvetro (1546-1616), expatriate Italian humanist, writer, and teacher
- Castelvetro di Modena, Italian municipality of the Province of Modena, Emilia-Romagna
- Castelvetro Piacentino, Italian municipality of the Province of Piacenza, Emilia-Romagna
