= Secondo Tizzoni =

Italian sculptor (1916–2001)

- Born: 1916; Piacenza, Italy
- Died: March 27, 2001 (aged 84); Piacenza, Italy
- Known for: sculptor

Secondo Tizzoni (1916 – 27 March 2001) was an Italian sculptor.

== Biography ==
He was born in Piacenza, and studied in the Instituto Gazzola and later at the Accademia di Brera, where he studied under Francesco Messina. In 1941, he was awarded the prize Abbondio Sangiorgio awarded by the Brera. He taught design in Middle School of Piacenza. He was invited to display at the VII Biennale Nazionale Arti Figurative della Cassa di Risparmio di Piacenza, near Galleria Ricci Oddi, which now exhibits some of his works.

Among his works are:

- Pugilist (circa 1950) at the Palazzetto dello Sport
- Young Woman with Tecne book in front of the Istituto Tecnico Industriale di Piacenza
- Il fuoco for the Caserma dei Vigili del Fuoco (Fire Station) in Piacenza
- Monument to Emilio Canzi, partisan martyr (circa 1950) in Coli, Val de Trebbia, province of Piacenza
- Monument to Lino Vescovi, detto il valoroso, partisan martyr, at Monticello di Gazzola, province of Piacenza
- Monument to Alberto Araldi "Paolo"
- Monument to Mons. Ersilio Menzani in the Duomo di Piacenza
- Monument to San Carlo Borromeo
- Monument to Mons. Giovanni Battista Scalabrini in Chicago.
