= Coli, Emilia-Romagna =

Coli
- Comune
- Comune di Coli
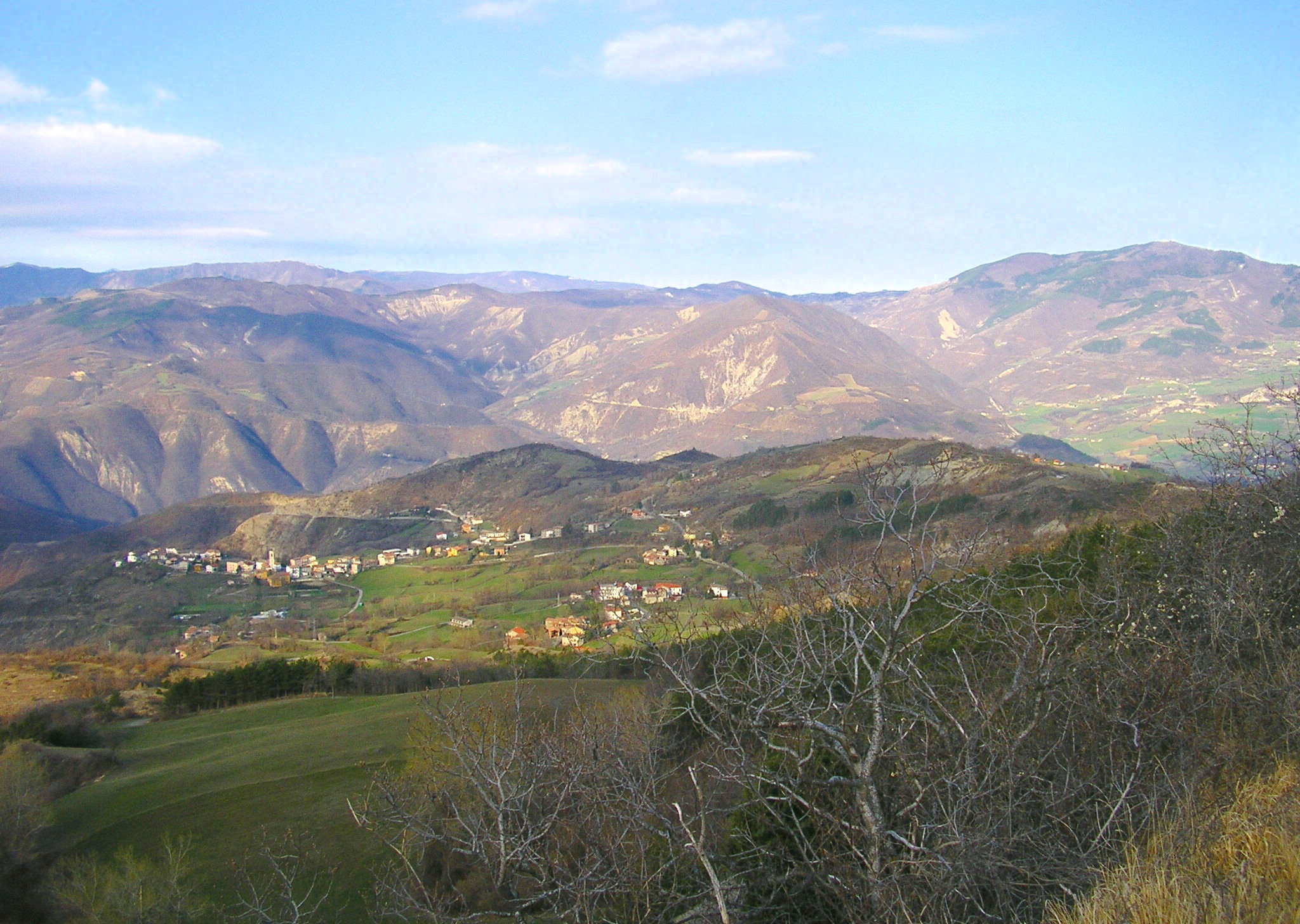

- Location within Italy Location within Emilia-Romagna
- Coordinates: 44°45′N 9°25′E
- Country: Italy
- Region: Emilia-Romagna
- Province: Province of Piacenza (PC)
- Frazioni: Aglio

Government
  - Mayor: Ester Pugni

Area
  - Total: 72.2 km^{2} (27.9 sq mi)

Population (Dec. 2004)
  - Total: 1,030
  - Density: 14.3/km^{2} (36.9/sq mi)
- Time zone: UTC+1 (CET)
  - Summer (DST): UTC+2 (CEST)
- Postal code: 29020
- Dialing code: 0523
- Website: Official website

Coli (Ligurian: Cor; Piacentino: Cor) is a comune (municipality) in the Province of Piacenza in the Italian region Emilia-Romagna, located about 160 kilometres (99 mi) west of Bologna and about 40 kilometres (25 mi) southwest of Piacenza. As of 31 December 2004, it had a population of 1,030 and an area of 72.2 square kilometres (27.9 mi^{2}).

The municipality of Coli contains the frazione (subdivision) Aglio.

Coli borders the following municipalities: Bettola, Bobbio, Corte Brugnatella, Farini, Ferriere, Travo.

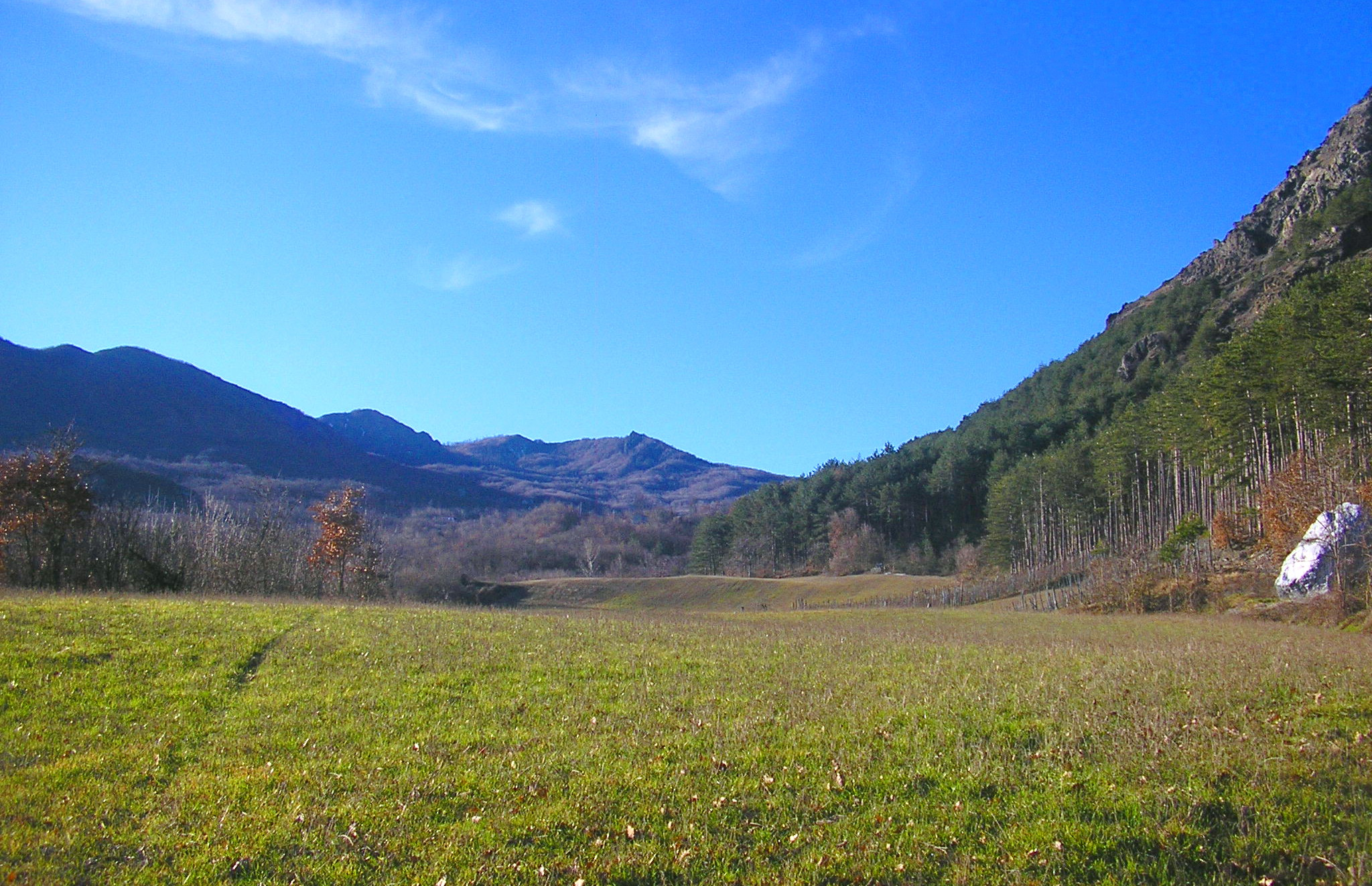
Armelio mountain

== Demographic evolution ==
Historical population

Year	Pop.	±%
1861	2,886	—
1871	3,164	+9.6%
1881	3,344	+5.7%
1901	3,079	−7.9%
1911	2,850	−7.4%

Year	Pop.	±%
1921	3,165	+11.1%
1931	3,115	−1.6%
1936	3,090	−0.8%
1951	2,697	−12.7%
1961	2,196	−18.6%

Year	Pop.	±%
1971	1,697	−22.7%
1981	1,329	−21.7%
1991	1,187	−10.7%
2001	1,076	−9.4%

Source: Data from ISTAT
