= Province of Piacenza =

Province of Italy

Province of Piacenza Provincia di Piacenza (Italian)
- Province
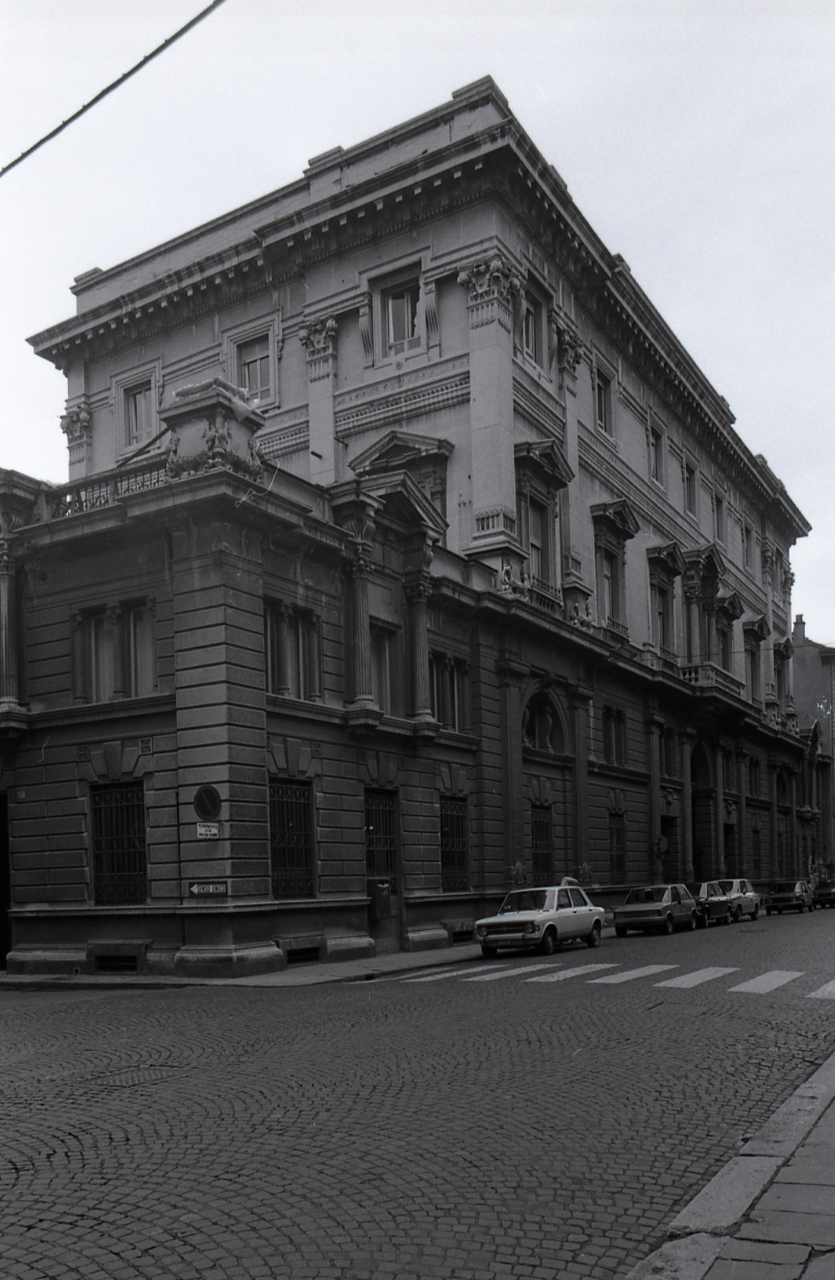
- The provincial seat in 1981

- Flag Coat of arms

- Location of the province of Piacenza in Italy
- Coordinates: 45°3′N 9°42′E
- Country: Italy
- Region: Emilia-Romagna
- Capital(s): Piacenza
- Municipalities: 46

Government
  - President: Monica Patelli

Area
  - Total: 2,585.86 km^{2} (998.41 sq mi)

Population (2026)
  - Total: 287,745
  - Density: 111.276/km^{2} (288.204/sq mi)

GDP
  - Total: €8.929 billion (2015)
  - Per capita: €31,056 (2015)
- Time zone: UTC+1 (CET)
  - Summer (DST): UTC+2 (CEST)
- Postal codes: 29010, 29020, 29100
- Telephone prefix: 0523
- ISO 3166 code: IT-PC
- Vehicle registration: PC
- ISTAT: 033

The province of Piacenza (Italian: provincia di Piacenza) is a province in the region of Emilia-Romagna in Italy. It has a population of 287,745 in an area of 2,585.86 square kilometres (998.41 sq mi) across its 46 municipalities.

It borders Lombardy (the provinces of Lodi, Cremona, and Pavia) to the north, Lombardy (the province of Pavia) and Piedmont (the province of Alessandria) to the west, the province of Parma to the east, and Liguria (the metropolitan city of Genoa) to the south.

== History ==
=== Prehistory and antiquity ===
The Piacenza territory was inhabited since prehistory, with several settlements in various points of the province, including the area of Sant'Andrea di Travo, which dates back to the late Neolithic period, at the end of the 5th millennium BC, during the spread throughout the territory of northern Italy of the Chasséen culture, which originated in the French area and the San Martino Plain, located in the municipality of Pianello Val Tidone, with findings dating back to the Middle Bronze Age and the Third Iron Age.

The territory was then inhabited by Ligurian, Etruscan and Celtic populations, until the conquest of the area by the Romans to whom is due, in 218 BC, the foundation of the colony of Placentia which became, together with the contemporary Cremona, the first Roman colony of the entire northern Italy. South-west of the city, shortly after its foundation, the Battle of the Trebia was fought between the Carthaginian troops led by Hannibal, who had just won the Battle of Ticinus, and the Roman legions commanded by the consul Tiberius Sempronius Longus who suffered a heavy defeat.

In 187 BC the city was connected with Rimini, located on the shores of the Adriatic Sea, by the Via Aemilia, commissioned by the consul Marcus Aemilius Lepidus, which became the main road axis of the entire north Italy. Subsequently, the Via Aemilia was extended north towards Milan, while Piacenza became a branching point, with the presence of roads connecting it to Tortona and to Susa, the latter passing through Pavia and Turin.

Starting from the 1st century BC the center of Veleia had great development, located in a hilly position in Val Chero derived from a pre-existing Ligurian settlement that became first a colony and then a municipium, maintaining a prominent position until the 3rd century when it declined rapidly, probably due to the landslides to which the area was subject. The Tabula Alimentaria Traianea, a bronze inscription concerning the mortgage loan ordered by Emperor Trajan, was found there in 1747.

Piacenza remained formally a colony until 90 BC when, following the promulgation of the Lex Julia, it became a municipium and saw the assignment to its inhabitants of Roman citizenship. Following this rule, the city was ascribed to the Gens Veturia.

The Piacenza countryside was the scene of the Battle of Piacentia fought in 271 AD by the Roman army, led by the emperor Aurelian, against a contingent of Alemanni and Juthungi who had sacked and burned the city: the invaders had the upper hand and the Romans retreated.

=== Medieval period ===
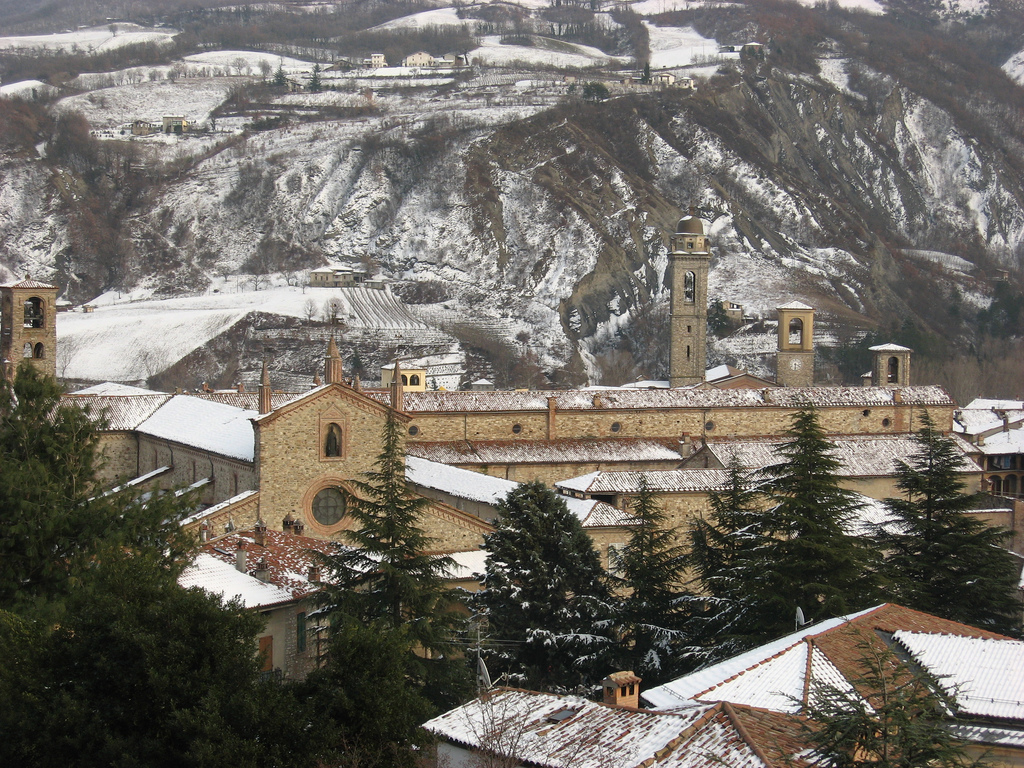
The Abbey of San Colombano in Bobbio

After the fall of the Western Roman Empire, Piacenza was initially occupied by the Byzantines, then conquered by the Goths led by Totila in 546. Indicators of Gothic settlements in the surrounding area are, for example, the toponyms Gossolengo and Gódi (a frazione of San Giorgio Piacentino). However, the city was reconquered by Byzantine forces after a few years, but in 570 it was taken by the Lombards, who arrived in Northern Italy two years earlier. They found a center, Piacenza, still quite wealthy despite the general crisis and in 576 they established a duchy there, probably occupying the Piacenza area at the end of the 6th century.

In 614 the Abbey of San Colombano of Bobbio was founded. The importance of the territory further increased after the foundation of the monastery.

It has been considered that at the end of the 8th century the area was divided into three districts: one consisting of the city of Piacenza and two organized in the countryside, autonomous from the first and located between the Via Aemilia and the Apennines. These would have been respectively fines Placentina between the city and the surrounding plain, iudiciaria Medianense in Val Trebbia and Val Nure, and fines Castriarquatense in the hilly and mountainous area of eastern Piacenza, but further investigations seem to correspond more to an ideal reference scheme than to actual administrative bodies.

Archaeological finds attesting the presence of the Germanic peoples are those of Rottofreno, Gazzola, Pianello Val Tidone, Vigolzone, Bettola, Borgonovo Val Tidone, Ziano Piacentino, Alta Val Tidone, Agazzano, Travo, Ponte dell'Olio and Farini.

After becoming a county during the period of domination of the Franks, the area was repeatedly contested in the last centuries of the millennium, until arriving, in 997, at the granting to the bishop of comital powers over the city by the emperor Otto III During the 11th century there were several struggles between the popular and aristocratic factions that culminated, in the first part of the following century, in the creation of the medieval commune, a process that was already complete by 1126.

Subsequently, Piacenza took part in the struggles between the communes and the Holy Roman Emperor Frederick Barbarossa, participating in the Lombard League. Near Piacenza, in an area straddling the Po between Calendasco and Somaglia, between 1154 and 1158, the emperor convened two important diets, the Diet of Roncaglia being the most notable. During the second diet, he asserted regal rights in response to claims made by the communes.

Until 1164 the western extension of the Piacenza area reached the Staffora, incorporating almost entirely the current Oltrepò Pavese: this latter territory was assigned to the Duchy of Pavia by Frederick Barbarossa; a subsequent arbitration in 1188 determined that the Bardonezza stream was the natural border between Piacenza and Pavia.

The advanced agriculture of the Piacenza countryside, the presence of a navigable river and important road axes (Via Aemilia, Mediolanum-Placentia and Postumia), together with the Apennine valleys that guaranteed connections with the Ligurian Sea, in addition to the political importance of the city and territory, revived the economy of Piacenza and surroundings from the 12th century, allowing the creation of significant business relations with Milan, Ferrara, Venice and especially Genoa. In particular, it was the expansion towards the latter city that ensured the success of Piacentine commercial and banking companies, created and developed thanks to the accumulation of substantial agricultural revenues. The merchant class of Piacenza belonged to the category of businessmen from northern Italy and Tuscany (the Lombards) who practiced credit operations and currency exchange throughout Europe. In the 13th century and 14th century Piacenza bankers and lenders operated in the East, in Paris, Marseille, Montpellier, Nîmes, in Champagne, in Burgundy, in Lisbon, Majorca, Barcelona, Valencia and Seville (where a street is dedicated to them, calle Placentines).

In the 13th century the domains of Piacenza extended northwards. The territories of San Rocco al Porto, Guardamiglio and Fombio became part of it in 1225, although they were on the left orographic side of the Po already in the early Middle Ages; the area of Caselle Landi was annexed instead in 1262, while Retegno was long contested between Piacenza and Lodi.

Amid the crisis of communal institutions, Piacenza became a battleground for the city's wealthiest families, who competed for control. In this context emerged the figure of Alberto Scotti who between the end of the 13th century and the beginning of the 14th century seized power in Piacenza several times, even briefly conquering Milan, before being definitively defeated by the Visconti forces who conquered Piacenza in 1313. The city remained under the control of the Duchy of Milan until 1499, with the exception of brief periods.

=== The Duchy of Parma and Piacenza ===
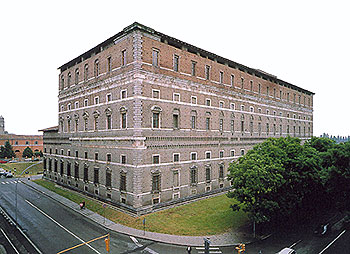
Palazzo Farnese

In 1521, the Piacenza area became part of the Papal States. In 1545 Pope Paul III established the Duchy of Parma and Piacenza, placing his son Pier Luigi Farnese at its head. The new state entity included most of the Piacenza area, with the exception of the Bobbio area which continued to remain subject to the Duchy of Milan and the territory of the Stato Pallavicino, located in the low Po Valley which was incorporated into the duchy only later, in 1585.

However, the duke was killed two years later by a conspiracy composed of local noble families. Following this episode the Piacenza area was occupied by the imperial troops of Ferrante I Gonzaga. The son of Pier Luigi, Ottavio Farnese, managed to retain dominion over Parma, which thus became the capital of the duchy, while the Piacenza area returned under Farnese dominion only in 1585, ceded to Ottavio by Philip II of Spain, with whom he had signed the Treaty of Ghent. Under the government of Ottavio also began the works for the construction of Palazzo Farnese in Piacenza.

In 1636, as part of the war waged by the duke Odoardo I Farnese, allied with the French, against Spain, the city of Piacenza was occupied by the latter. Following the peace agreement, mediated by Pope Urban VIII, the Spaniards abandoned the city the following year in exchange for the breaking of the alliance between the Farnese and the French.

The last duke, Antonio Farnese, died without heirs. In 1731, the ducal throne passed to Charles III of Spain, the son of Elisabeth Farnese and King Philip V of Spain: the new duke Charles I settled in Parma in 1731, however in 1738, with the third Treaty of Vienna which sanctioned the end of the War of the Polish Succession, the crown of the Kingdom of the Two Sicilies was recognized to Charles, while the Duchy of Parma and Piacenza passed to the Austrians, represented by emperor Charles VI. In 1748 with the Treaty of Aix-la-Chapelle the duchy returned under the dominion of the Bourbon family, with the throne assigned to Philip, brother of Charles.

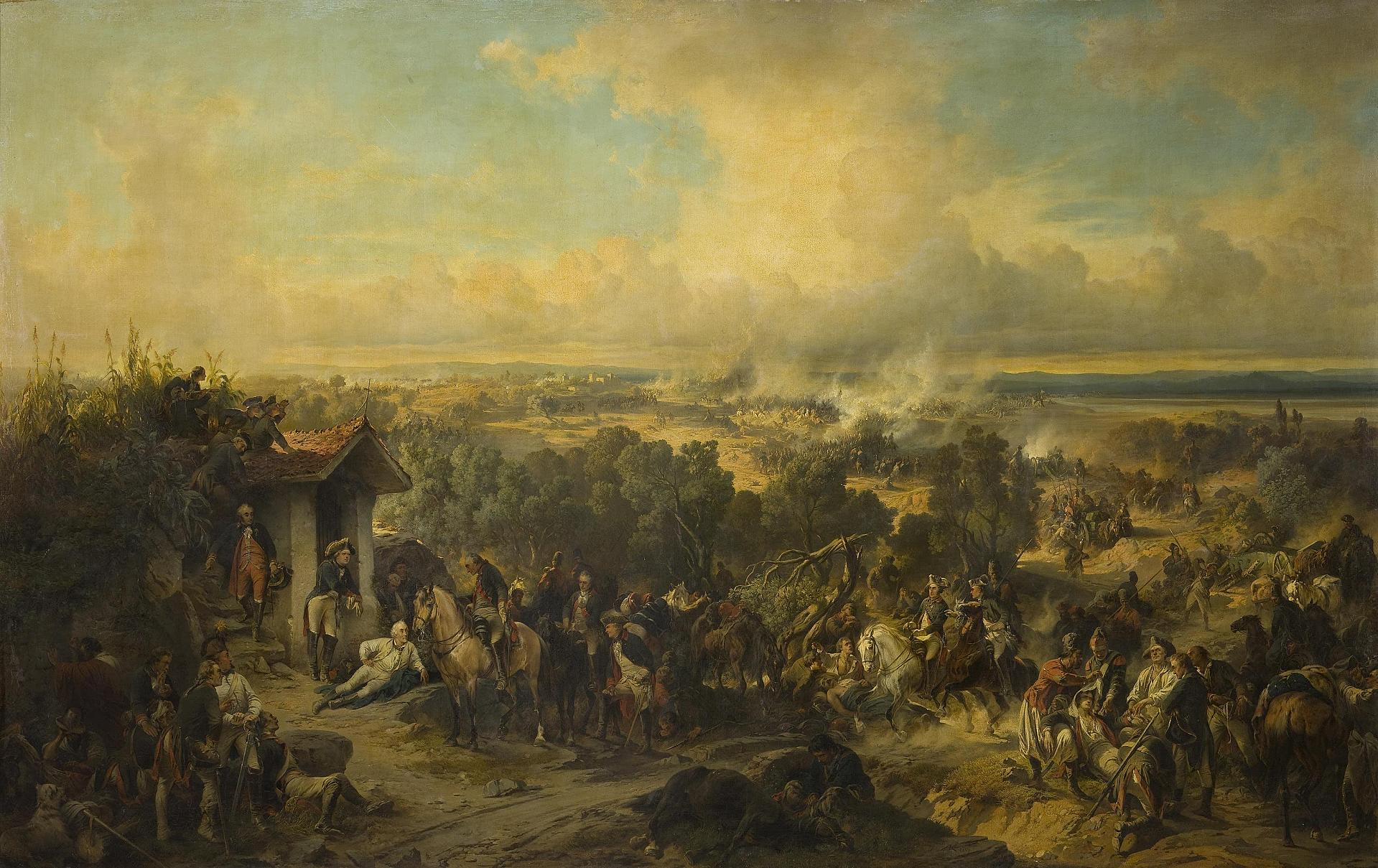
The Battle of Trebbia in a painting by Alexander von Kotzebue

In 1796, despite the neutrality declared by the duke Ferdinand, the Napoleonic troops entered Piacenza, obtaining a substantial war indemnity. In 1799 the western part of the province was the scene of the Battle of Trebbia, won by the Austro-Russian forces of General Suvorov engaged in his campaign in Italy against the French led by General Étienne Macdonald.

Despite the French occupation Ferdinand formally maintained sovereignty until 1801 when, with the treaties of Lunéville and Aranjuez, the duchy passed under French control, with the counterpart of the ascent to the throne of Etruria of Ferdinand's son Louis. Under French control the Piacenza area was separated from Parma and in 1808 Napoleon appointed Charles François Lebrun titular duke of Piacenza in his name.

In 1814, with the exile of Napoleon to Elba, the Duchy of Parma, Piacenza and Guastalla was assigned to Napoleon's wife, Marie Louise; this decision was then definitively confirmed for life by the Congress of Vienna, despite the claims of the Bourbons, to whom the return of the state was foreseen upon the death of the duchess.

After the death of Marie Louise, she was succeeded on the ducal throne, on 31 December 1847, by Charles II who immediately took some decisions that alienated popular consent. In March 1848 several riots broke out first in Parma and then in Piacenza where on 10 May a plebiscite took place culminating in the request for annexation to the Kingdom of Sardinia. The results of the vote were delivered to King Charles Albert of Sardinia, encamped near Verona, who thus proclaimed Piacenza Firstborn of Italian Unity. After the defeat at Custoza, the city fell again under Austro-Bourbon domination, characterized by strong repression.

=== From Italian Unification ===
In May 1859 some riots forced the regent duchess Louise d'Artois to abandon Parma. Subsequently, the city government held two further plebiscites that confirmed the request for accession to the Kingdom of Sardinia and in August the government of the city passed into the hands of Luigi Carlo Farini, until then dictator of the Modenese provinces, who established the Assembly of Representatives of the People, which on 12 September voted for annexation to the Kingdom of Sardinia.

The province was established in 1860 and the seat of the administration was from March 1860 the Palazzo della Provincia in Corso Garibaldi in Piacenza.

In 1923, Bobbio and some of its territory, which was originally part of the County of Bobbio and became the Province of Bobbio in 1743, became part of the Province of Piacenza for the first time. This territory was part of the Kingdom of Sardinia until the unification of Italy.

At the same time, the municipalities of Bardi and Boccolo de' Tassi, located in the upper Val Ceno, as they were part of the catchment basin of the Val di Taro, passed to the Province of Parma. In 1926 some hamlets of the municipality of Boccolo, which was simultaneously aggregated to Bardi, returned to be part of the Province of Piacenza, becoming part of the municipalities of Farini d'Olmo and Ferriere.

During the World War II the city and some centers of the province were heavily hit by Allied air bombings that struck in the city, among others, the railway bridge over the Po, the Piacenza railway station, the hospital and the arsenal as well as portions of the historic center, for a total of 92 raids that caused about 300 victims, while in the province, the infrastructure of the Piacenza-Bettola railway line was hit. Following the armistice on September 8, 1943, several partisan groups began operating in the Apennine valleys and plains. These groups totaled 6,636 soldiers and suffered 926 casualties while fighting the German and Republican armies. At the end of the conflict, the city was awarded the Gold Medal of Military Valor.

In the post-war period, in the area of Cortemaggiore, deposits of petroleum and natural gas were identified that were particularly significant in giving a decisive boost to the Italian post-war boom. On that occasion the logo of the six-legged dog of Supercortemaggiore was created, then becoming the symbol of Eni.

On the night between 14 September and 15 September 2015 a part of the Province of Piacenza was devastated by the sudden floods of the Nure, Aveto and Trebbia, due to bad weather, which caused extensive damage and the death of three people. The most affected locations were Roncaglia, Bettola, Farini, Ponte dell'Olio, Ferriere, Rivergaro, Bobbio, Marsaglia di Corte Brugnatella, and Ottone.

During the COVID-19 pandemic, in 2020 the Piacenza area was the Italian province most affected by the virus for mortality in relative numbers on the total population, with the capital characterizing itself as the most affected Municipality of Emilia-Romagna.

==== Consultative referendums on municipal mergers ====
The table summarizes the consultative referendums for the fusion of municipalities held starting from 1 December 2013. Municipalities that approved the referendum are indicated in bold.

Date of referendum	Municipalities	Registered	Turnout Percentage	In favor	Against	Name of new municipality	Date of establishment
6 March 2016	**Borgonovo Val Tidone**; Ziano Piacentino	5,822; 2,233	30% 52.17%	**69.13%** 37.29%	30.87% **62.71%**	Borgonovo-Ziano	Request not accepted by the regional council
16 October 2016	Bettola; Farini; Ferriere	2,823; 1,792; 1,692	44% 30% 37%	32.45% 47.36% 24.88%	**67.45%** **52.64%** **75.12%**	Upper Val Nure	Request not accepted by the regional council
16 October 2016	Ponte dell'Olio; Vigolzone	4,097; 3,480	47.9% 46.7%	39.97% 40.86%	**60.03%** **59.14%**	Pontevigo	Request not accepted by the regional council
28 May 2017	**Nibbiano**; **Pecorara**; **Caminata**	1,854; 697; 238	45.8% 49.5% 65.5%	**64.01%** **66.08%** **79.74%**	35.99% 33.92% 20.26%	Alta Val Tidone	1 January 2018

=== Symbols ===

Description of the coat of arms:

A Samnite shield with a silver cube on a red background, surmounted by a gold crown adorned with gems, and lined internally with red velvet. Oak and laurel branches intertwined with golden berries adorn the shield.

Description of the gonfalon:

A light blue silk banner with a scalloped bottom bearing the institution's coat of arms in the center and the following inscription in gold: Provincial Administration of Piacenza.

== Geography ==
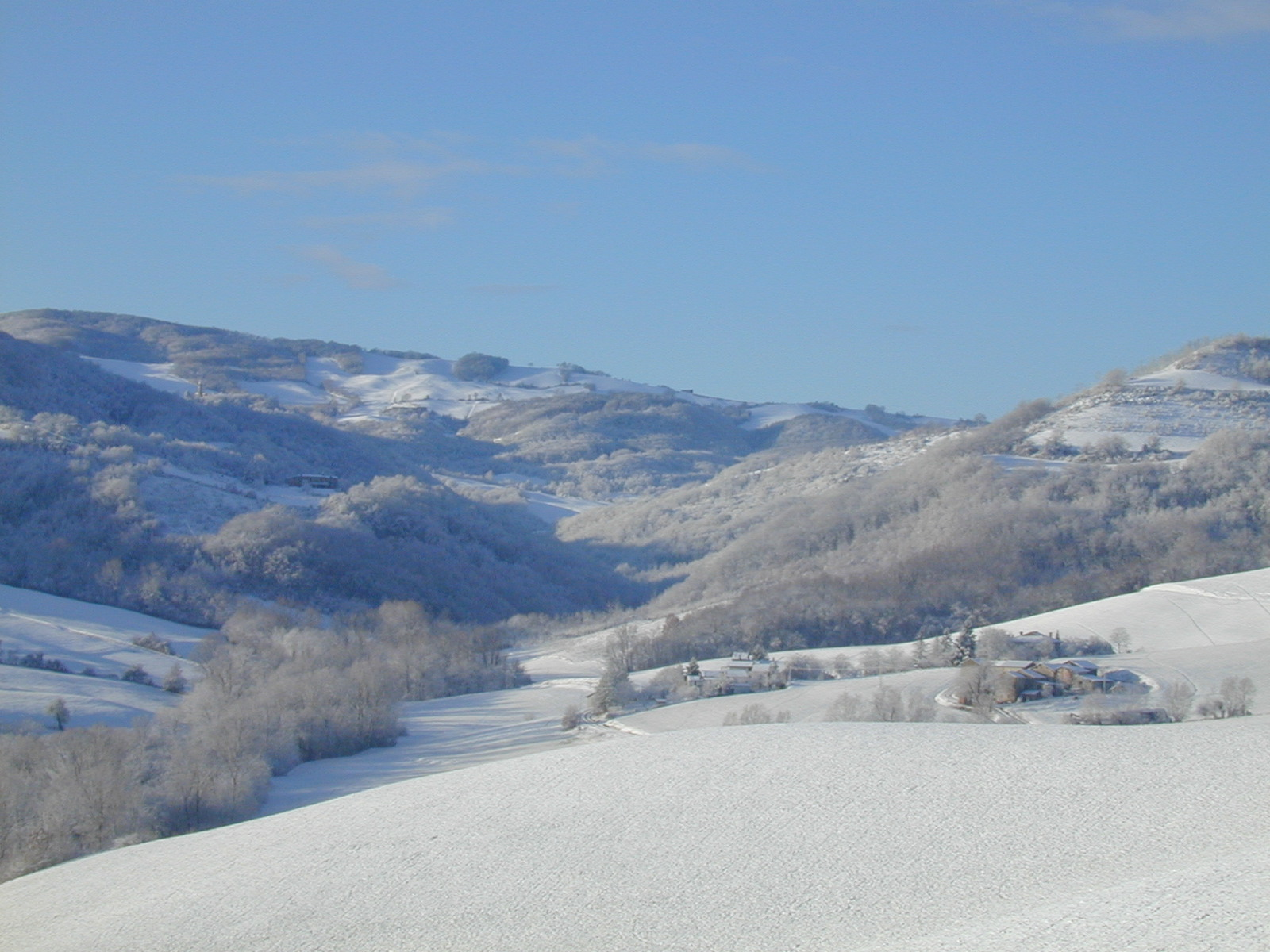
The Val Luretta in winter

The Province of Piacenza extends between the Po Valley, south of the Po River, and the reliefs of the Ligurian Apennines. The majority of the provincial area, slightly more than 60%, consists of hills and mountains, while the remaining part is located in the plain. Except for a short stretch near the mouth of the Nure stream where it forms the border with the municipality of Caselle Landi in the province of Lodi, the northern border with the provinces of Pavia, Lodi and Cremona is represented by the Po River. The eastern border with the Province of Parma follows, from the south, the watershed with the Val Ceno, then the Stirone stream, the Ongina stream and, finally, the Arda stream from its confluence with the Ongina to its mouth in the Po.

To the south, the border with the Metropolitan City of Genoa is represented for a short stretch by the watershed between Val Nure and Val d'Aveto, then by the Aveto stream and by the Terenzone stream. The border with the Province of Alessandria is represented by the watershed between Val Borbera and Val Boreca, while the border with the Province of Pavia is represented by the watershed between Val Boreca and Val Staffora, for a short stretch by the same Staffora stream near Samboneto, then by the Trebbia River, by the watersheds between the Val Avagnone and other lateral valleys tributary to the Trebbia, between Val Trebbia and Val Staffora, between Val Trebbia and Val Tidone, between Val Tidoncello and Val Tidone and between Val Tidone and Val Versa, with the exception of the Moncasacco area where the Versa stream itself marks the border for a very short stretch, and, finally, by the Bardonezza stream. The various stretches are separated from each other by conventional border segments.

The central-southern part of the province is mountainous and hilly and there are located the main Piacentine valleys which from west to east are: the Val Tidone (formed by the homonymous stream), the Val Trebbia (Trebbia), the Val Nure (Nure) and the Val d'Arda (Arda). Other minor valleys are the Val d'Aveto, crossed by the main tributary of the Trebbia the Val Chiavenna, the Val Chero, the Val Riglio, the Val Luretta, the Val d'Ongina, the Val Chiarone, the Val Perino and the Val Boreca. The northern part of the province is included in the Po Valley, whose northeastern area is called Bassa Piacentina.

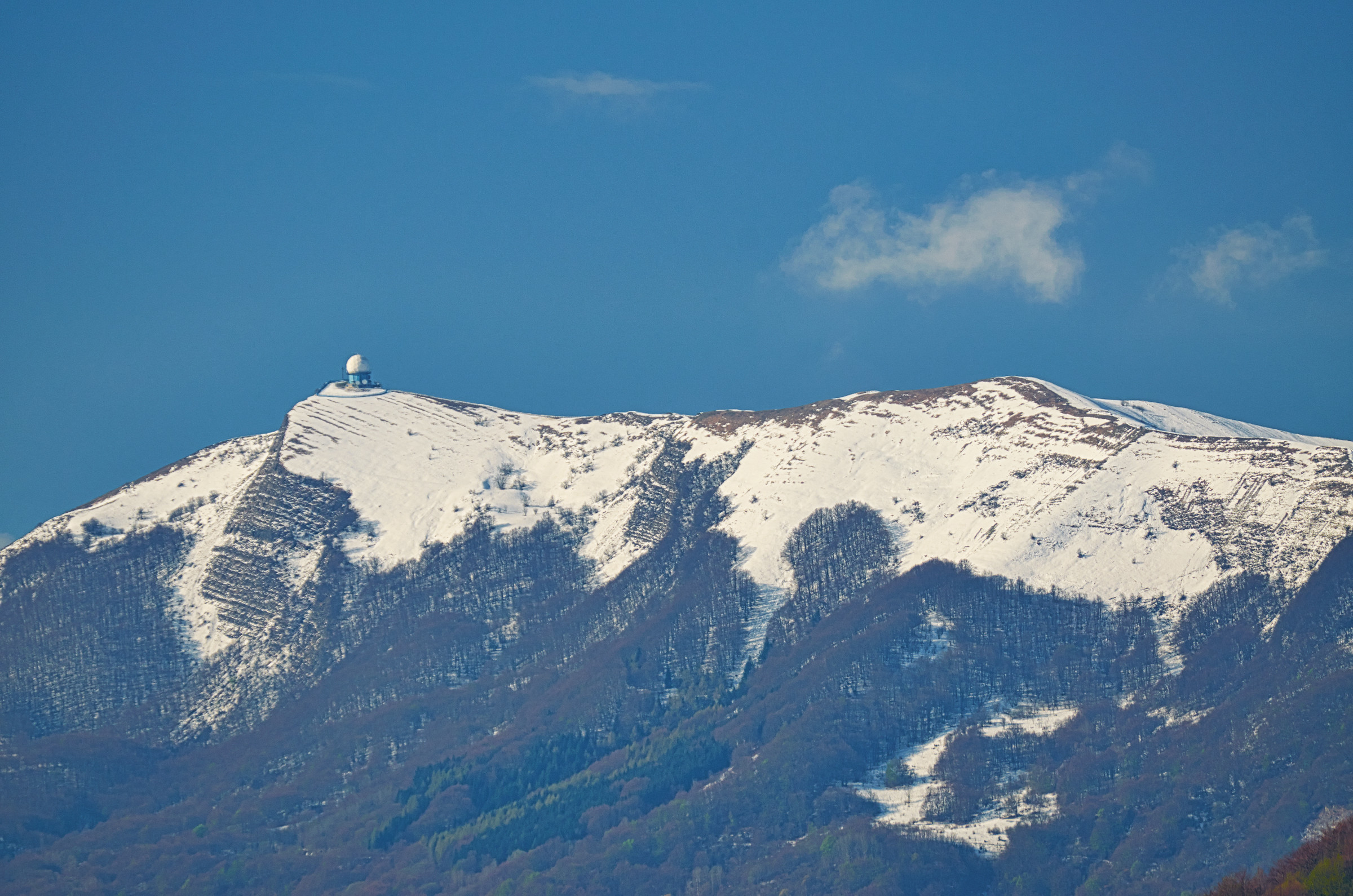
Mount Lesima

=== Orography ===
The highest peaks of the province are located in the upper valleys of Boreca, Nure and Aveto. The highest peak of the province is Mount Bue (1,777 metres (5,830 ft)) Among the other peaks are the Monte Nero (1,752 metres (5,748 ft)), the Mount Lesima (1,724 metres (5,656 ft)), the Monte Chiappo (1,700 metres (5,600 ft)), the Monte Cavalmurone (1,671 metres (5,482 ft)), the Monte Legnà (1,669 metres (5,476 ft)), the Monte Alfeo (1,651 metres (5,417 ft)) and Monte Carmo (1,640 metres (5,380 ft)).

=== Hydrography ===
==== Rivers ====
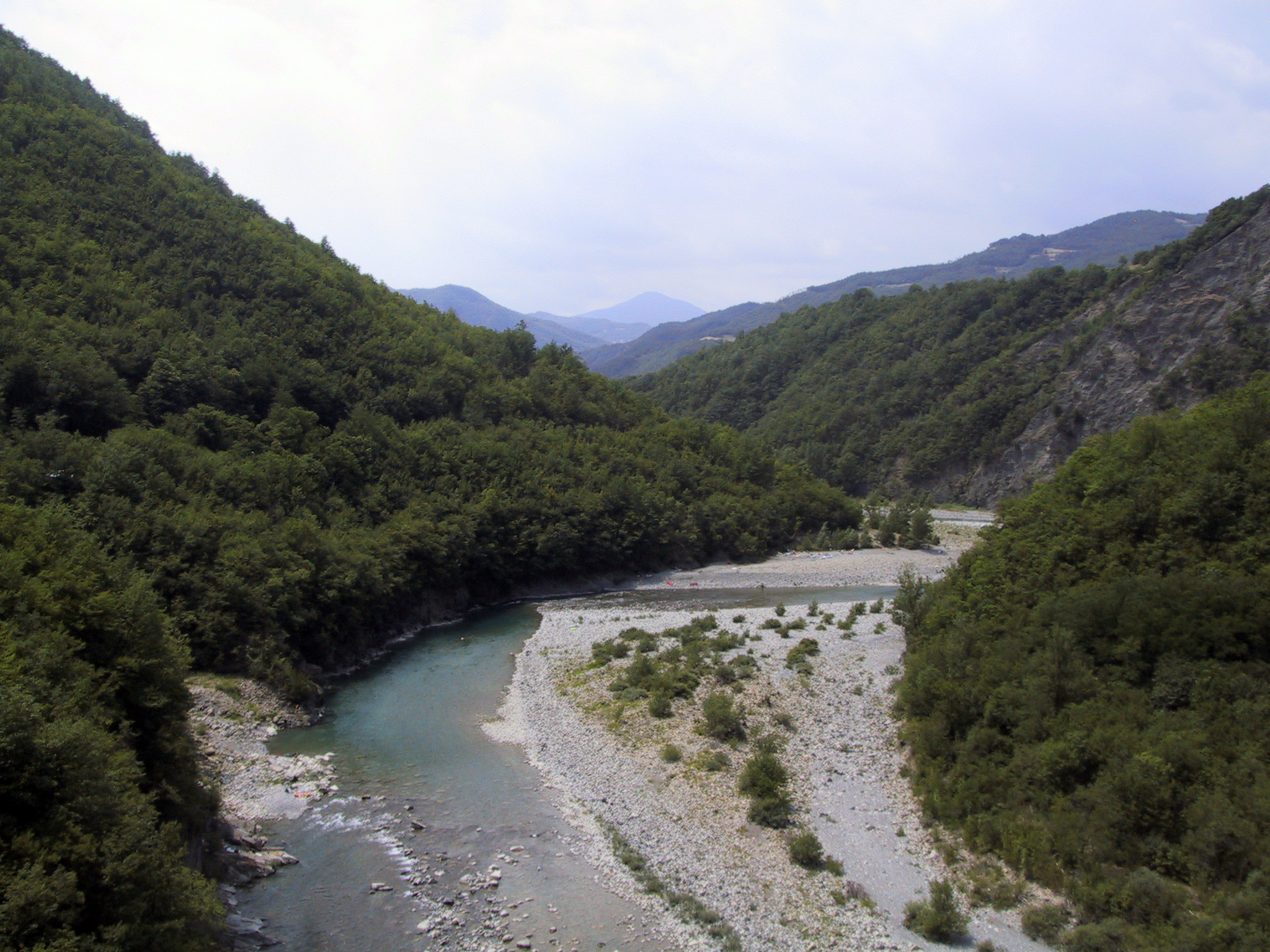
The Trebbia River

The territory of the province is entirely included in the hydrographic basin of the Po River and it flows into it through its tributaries Staffora, which although flowing almost entirely in the Province of Pavia marks for a short stretch the border between the two provinces near Samboneto, a hamlet of Zerba, Tidone, Versa, Trebbia, Nure, Chiavenna and Arda.

The Boreca, the Aveto, and the Perino belong to the Trebbia basin. The Luretta belongs to the Tidone basin, while the Chero, Riglio, and Vezzeno (the latter a tributary of the Riglio) belong to the Chiavenna basin. The Ongina flows into the Arda basin and the Stirone into the Taro. The Lardana and the Lavaiana belong to the Nure basin.

==== Lakes ====
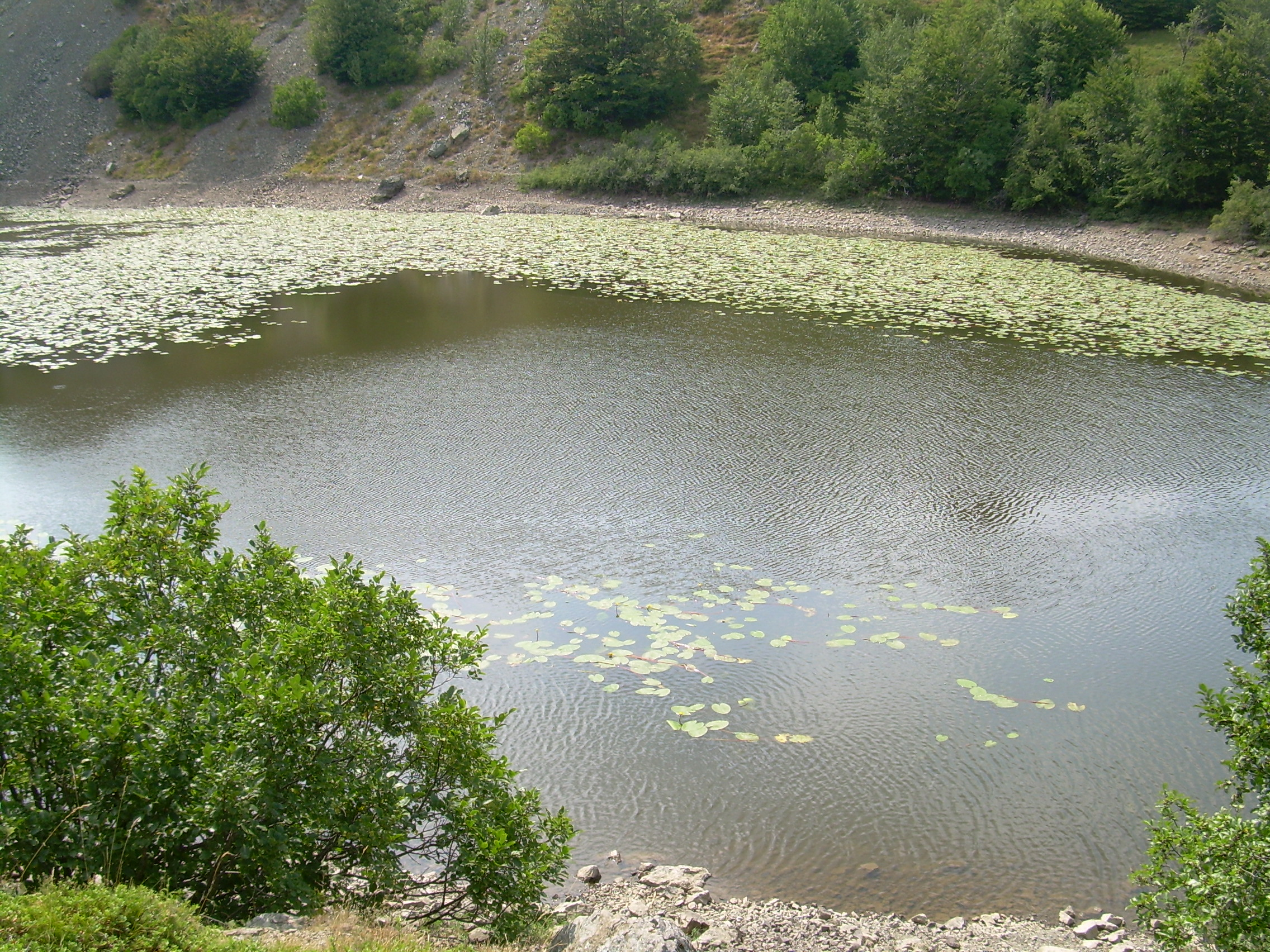
Lake Bino

In the province there are three lakes created following the construction of artificial dams:

- the Lake Mignano, created with the construction of the homonymous dam between 1919 and 1934, crossed by the Arda stream and located between the municipalities of Morfasso and Vernasca with an area of about 2 square kilometres (0.77 sq mi).
- the Lake of Trebecco, created with the construction of the Molato dam between 1921 and 1928, crossed by the Tidone stream and located between the municipalities of Alta Val Tidone and Zavattarello, the latter located in the Province of Pavia, 2.5 kilometres (1.6 mi) long and up to 750 m (2,460 ft) wide.
- the Lake of Boschi, created in the 1920s with the construction of the homonymous dam, crossed by the Aveto stream, located between the municipalities of Ferriere and Rezzoaglio, the latter belonging to the Metropolitan City of Genoa, is about 2 kilometres (1.2 mi) long, with a maximum depth of 30 metres (98 ft) and a capacity of 1,200,000 cubic metres (42,000,000 cu ft).

There are small lakes of glacial origin in the upper Val Nure: the Lake Moo, the Lake Bino and the Lake Nero.

=== Climate ===
The climate of the province is temperate, subcontinental in the plain and hills and cool in the mountains. The average annual temperature is 12.2 °C (54.0 °F) in the capital, 11.5/12 °C (54 °F) in the mid-hill area and 8.5 °C (47.3 °F) in the valley floor stations located at higher altitudes. The coldest month is January with average temperatures slightly above zero in the plain and slightly below in the mountains, while the warmest month is July with an average temperature of 22.9 °C (73.2 °F) in the capital and 18.1 °C (64.6 °F) in the mountains.

The climate is more continental in the plain due to its distance from the Mediterranean Sea, while the mountains' proximity to Liguria makes the climate more similar to a warm temperate one.

Annual precipitation is about 850–900 mm (35 in) in the plain for a total of 80-85 rainy days per year and 1,000–1,500 mm (59 in) in the average hill for about a hundred rainy days per year, with an increase that follows the increase in altitude. Starting from the last years of the 20th century winter precipitation has decreased and autumn precipitation has increased. Snowfalls are quite common with an average of 40 cm (16 in) per year in the plain which increases significantly in the hills and mountains.

=== Municipalities ===
The province has 46 municipalities:

- Agazzano
- Alseno
- Alta Val Tidone
- Besenzone
- Bettola
- Bobbio
- Borgonovo Val Tidone
- Cadeo
- Calendasco
- Caorso
- Carpaneto Piacentino
- Castel San Giovanni
- Castell'Arquato
- Castelvetro Piacentino
- Cerignale
- Coli
- Corte Brugnatella
- Cortemaggiore
- Farini
- Ferriere
- Fiorenzuola d'Arda
- Gazzola
- Gossolengo
- Gragnano Trebbiense
- Gropparello
- Lugagnano Val d'Arda
- Monticelli d'Ongina
- Morfasso
- Ottone
- Piacenza
- Pianello Val Tidone
- Piozzano
- Podenzano
- Ponte dell'Olio
- Pontenure
- Rivergaro
- Rottofreno
- San Giorgio Piacentino
- San Pietro in Cerro
- Sarmato
- Travo
- Vernasca
- Vigolzone
- Villanova sull'Arda
- Zerba
- Ziano Piacentino

==== Municipal unions ====
The Province of Piacenza comprises four municipal unions, which group together 19 municipalities:

- Unione Alta Val Nure, composed of four municipalities: Bettola, Farini, Ferriere and Ponte dell'Olio.
- Unione Montana Valli Trebbia e Luretta, composed of eight municipalities: Bobbio, Cerignale, Coli, Corte Brugnatella, Ottone, Piozzano, Travo and Zerba.
- Unione Val Nure e Val Chero, composed of five municipalities: Carpaneto Piacentino, Gropparello, Podenzano, San Giorgio Piacentino and Vigolzone.
- Unione Alta Val d'Arda, composed of four municipalities: Castell'Arquato, Lugagnano Val d'Arda, Morfasso and Vernasca.

Previously, the following municipal unions were also active:

- Unione Bassa Val d'Arda Fiume Po, of which the following municipalities were members: Besenzone, Caorso, Castelvetro Piacentino, Cortemaggiore, Monticelli d'Ongina, San Pietro in Cerro and Villanova sull'Arda. It was dissolved at the beginning of 2022.
- Unione Bassa Val Trebbia e Val Luretta, of which the following municipalities were members: Agazzano, Calendasco, Gazzola, Gossolengo, Gragnano Trebbiense, Rivergaro, Rottofreno and Sarmato. It was dissolved at the end of 2024.
- Unione dei Comuni della via Emilia Piacentina, of which the following municipalities were members: Alseno, Cadeo, Fiorenzuola d'Arda, and Pontenure. It was dissolved at the end of 2021.
- Unione dei Comuni Val Tidone, of which the following municipalities were members: Castel San Giovanni, Nibbiano, Pecorara and Pianello Val Tidone. It was dissolved in 2018.
- Unione della Bassa Val Tidone, of which the following municipalities were members: Borgonovo Val Tidone, Castel San Giovanni and Ziano Piacentino. It was dissolved in 2015.

==== Former mountain communities ====
The Piacenza territory included three mountain communities that were dissolved between 2008 and 2013.

Name	Administrative seat	Municipalities
Piacenza Apennines Mountain Community	Bobbio	Bobbio Cerignale Coli Corte Brugnatella Ottone Piozzano Travo Zerba
Mountain Community of the Nure and Arda Valleys	Bettola	Bettola Farini Ferriere Gropparello Vernasca Morfasso
Mountain Community of the Tidone Valley	Nibbiano	Caminata Nibbiano Pecorara Pianello Val Tidone

== Demographics ==
Historical population
Year	Pop.	±%
1861	219,803	—
1871	238,003	+8.3%
1881	238,215	+0.1%
1901	255,349	+7.2%
1911	275,225	+7.8%
1921	295,653	+7.4%
1931	295,992	+0.1%
1936	294,785	−0.4%
1951	299,138	+1.5%
1961	291,059	−2.7%
1971	284,881	−2.1%
1981	278,424	−2.3%
1991	267,633	−3.9%
2001	263,872	−1.4%
2011	284,616	+7.9%
2021	283,435	−0.4%
Source: ISTAT

As of 2026, the population is 287,745, of which 49.6% are male, and 50.4% are female. Minors make up 14.6% of the population, and seniors make up 25.7%.

=== Immigration ===
As of 2025, immigrants make up 19.1% of the total population. The 5 largest foreign countries of birth are Albania, Romania, Morocco, India, and Ukraine.

=== Languages and dialects ===
The Piacentino dialect, alongside Italian, is still present. Despite the different elements it shares with the Lombard and Piedmontese languages, it is classified as part of the Emilian language. However, on the Apennines, there are transitional dialects between Emilian and Ligurian languages. These dialects give way to Ligurian varieties in some municipalities of the upper Val Trebbia. The peculiar Bobbio dialect is notable in this area.

== Religion ==
In the ecclesiastical jurisdiction of the Catholic Church, most of the provincial territory coincides with the area of the Diocese of Piacenza-Bobbio. It is subdivided into 7 vicariates and includes, in addition to most of the Piacenza area, also the upper Genoese Val Trebbia, part of the Oltrepò Pavese, Val Taro and Val Ceno in the Parma area. The parishes located in the municipalities of Castelvetro Piacentino, Monticelli d'Ongina and Villanova sull'Arda, united in the vicariate of the Bassa Piacentina, instead belong to the Diocese of Fidenza.

== Culture ==
The Apennine area is the most conservative region of the province regarding folklore. It remained isolated from external influences and modernity. Much of the Piacenza Apennine's traditions can be traced back to the Quattro Province area. This name defines a predominantly mountainous territory divided among the provinces of four distinct regions: Genoa (Liguria), Piacenza (Emilia-Romagna), Pavia (Lombardy), and Alessandria (Piedmont). The people of this area have maintained very similar customs and habits for centuries. This is especially evident with regard to songs, music, dances, and popular festivals. The upper Piacenza valleys included in this territory are Val Trebbia, Val Tidone, Val d'Aveto, and Val Boreca. Val Nure is less influenced by this heritage, and Val d'Arda is excluded.

=== Songs ===
Folkloric songs from Piacenza and the surrounding area have largely disappeared since the beginning of the 20th century. These songs were part of a genre known as matinäda, named for the time of day when they were performed: morning. Matinäda pieces were mostly romantic and similar to those in other Northern Italian areas. Consisting of four or six hendecasyllable verses—rarely eight—that followed different rhythms, they were sung during work activities or at the beginning of spring. They were accompanied by a guitar and an accordion and were used to court unmarried girls. The texts were sung in the Piacentino dialect but sometimes included elements from other Gallo-Italic languages or Tuscan dialects. This is explained by the non-native origins of some of the songs, which originated in other Italian provinces and regions and were adapted to the Piacentino dialect.

The genre was also improperly known as buśinäda, a term that actually indicated a type of poetic composition by a storyteller or popular versifier. These storytellers and versifiers described real events in verse and often presented them in an ironic or satirical form. While they are best known in their Milanese version, these literary works, published on broadsheets, were also produced in Piacenza.

The choirs of the Piacenza Apennines are instead influenced by the trallalero from Genoa.

=== Music and dances ===
The music of the Piacenza Apennines, located in the four-province area, is traditionally performed with the Apennine piffero, müsa (similar to the more common piva in Val Nure), and accordion. The müsa, an Apennine bagpipe with a single drone, is perhaps the most distinctive instrument. It fell out of use at the beginning of the 20th century when the accordion became more popular. In recent decades, however, it has reappeared, once again accompanying the piffero and even being played alongside the accordion.

Players of these instruments can be heard at dance parties in the towns and hamlets of the Piacenza Apennines, or in neighboring provinces, as well as at folkloric festivals held in the summer.

During sagre, patronal festivals, and other folkloric festivals and celebrations, such as Easter and Carnival, performances featuring traditional instruments that play dance music, such as the jig (for two or four dancers), the Monferrina, and the Alessandrina, are held. The bisagna was a dance that once existed but has since disappeared; it was recently revived in the municipality of Ferriere. Some describe it as a dance performed with sticks, similar to the Morris dance.

At the beginning of the 20th century, the ball dal ferì (dance of the wounded)—also called ball dal frì in mountainous areas—was still widespread in the Piacenza countryside. It was a playful group dance. Accompanied by a guitar and an accordion, it was performed by a pair of selected dancers through predetermined beats led by a person who directed the dance. During the dance, the dancers exchanged rhymes in the form of questions and answers. These rhymes were used to give compliments, weave praises, launch challenges or amorous vendettas, or make declarations of love. Sometimes, the rhymes were intended to annoy the partner. After a couple of turns, the dance would be interrupted so the dancers could change partners and resume the steps and rhymes. Similar dances included the ball dal tu-tu, the ball dal ciär, the ball dal cüsein, and the ball dal specc', which were often performed on threshing floors during the corn husking period.

=== Holidays and celebrations ===
Few traditional festivals have survived modernity and the depopulation of rural areas, particularly the Apennines, with the exception of the patronal festivals. However, it is precisely in these mountainous regions that celebrations associated with the arrival of spring are still held. One such celebration is May Day, which generally takes place on the evening of April 30. This festival has pagan origins, probably Celtic, and is connected to Beltane. It was widespread throughout Europe, and in Italy, it has remained popular mainly in the most isolated territories. In Upper Val Trebbia Piacentina, this event is also known as Carlin di Maggio and is celebrated in Marsaglia di Corte Brugnatella on April 30. In Val Tidone, it is celebrated as the Festa d'la Galeina Grisa (Festival of the Grey Hen); in Val d'Arda, it is celebrated as the Cantamaggio; and in Upper Val Nure, it is celebrated as the Calendimaggio. In the second half of the 19th century, May Day-related events took place in a wider area of the Piacenza countryside, still relegated to the Apennine centers.

On January 17, the Feast of Saint Anthony the Great is celebrated in various locations throughout the province. In Piacenza, the celebration includes the blessing of horses, donkeys, mules, and pets, as well as bread, salt, and oil, which are traditionally used for healing shingles. People invoke the saint for protection against this disease.

Carnival celebrations are still deeply rooted in Fiorenzuola d'Arda, where the event is known as Zobia (or Śobia in Piacentino). This name refers to an unattractive and disturbing female figure, resembling a witch, and the bonfire on which she burns. This character seems to have been created to mock Jews who sold used clothing, but the anti-Semitic connotation is no longer present. Bonfires, often fueled by effigies set ablaze, were a characteristic feature of various locations in the province, and this tradition is still observed in Borgonovo Val Tidone, where it is called Brüśa la veccia (Burn the old woman), and in Gropparello. During Carnival, the traditions of the masquerade ball and the second parade in the Lenten period are kept alive in Bobbio. The masks of Piacenza have disappeared: the cowardly and boastful shoemaker Tulein Cücalla, his coquettish and gossipy wife Cesira, the cunning Apennine mountaineer Vigion, and his wife Lureinsa, a kind and robust mother who helps her husband with his schemes. The Apennine carnival parades have also fallen into obscurity. They were led by a mask with ugly features called U Brüttu (The Ugly) or A Bestra (The Beast).

In Bobbio, during the celebration of Saint Joseph on February 19, an effigy is burned in bonfires (Fuiè ad San Giüsèp) to symbolize the end of winter and the beginning of spring.

On the days of Easter and Easter Monday in Fiorenzuola d'Arda and Lugagnano Val d'Arda the egg fight takes place, known as Ponta e cül (Top and bottom) or Ponta l'öv (Push the egg), during which participants challenge each other to break their opponents' eggs by lightly tapping them. This pastime was also popular at neighborhood festivals in Piacenza, where it was known as "ciucä i öv" (beat the eggs).

On the evening of June 23, for the Feast of Saint John the Baptist, a vase or glass bottle is filled three-quarters full and the white of an egg is added. The shape that appears in the container is said to predict a fortunate event, such as a trip, wealth, or love. This ritual is repeated on the night between June 28 and 29 for the Feast of Saints Peter and Paul and is known as Boat of Saint Peter. In the past, people believed that the "Dew of Saint John," collected on the morning of June 24, had miraculous powers. It was said to prevent diseases related to sight or hearing and help mothers who were having difficulty breastfeeding.

According to extinct Piacenza traditions, the dead returned to their earthly homes on the night between All Saints' Day (November 1) and All Souls' Day (November 2). Even in the early 20th century, dwellers of the Apennine Valley would rise at dawn to give up their beds to the weary dead, who had traveled from the afterlife. Pears, chestnuts, and a lit lamp were left for them. Typical of those days were sweets called "fava beans of the dead" and actual fava beans. These legumes and other foods were collected by poor boys who knocked on the doors of wealthier Piacenza families. This practice was also carried out in various towns by children or young people in taverns or homes, depending on local customs. Throughout the Piacenza region, lights of various types, such as candles, lamps, and illuminations, were lit in homes for much of the 20th century.

The feast associated with the arrival of Saint Lucy on December 13 is still widely celebrated. As in other regions of Lombardy, Verona and Trentino, children in Piacenza eagerly await this day when Saint Lucy will arrive on a donkey at night to give them candy and gifts.

=== Card games ===
Card games such as scopa (scua), asso pigliatutto (ass ciapatütt), beggar-my-neighbour (cäva camiśa), rubamazzo, briscola (briscula) and merda o asino use Piacentine cards with Spanish faces and French suits. French troops introduced them during the Napoleonic occupation, and they were redesigned in Piacenza with double faces, also called mirrored, in the 19th century.

=== Legendary creatures ===
As in many other regions of Italy and Europe, the sprite, or fulëtt, appears in Piacenza folklore. This mischievous entity hides household utensils, plays pranks on women, beats them, tousles their hair, and steals their blankets. The sprite also slaps or pinches sleeping men, breaks objects, laughs loudly, makes noises at night, and disturbs animals in the stables. The sprite's preferred victims are horses, which it disturbs until they are exhausted at night and whose manes it braids.

The creatures that terrorize children are the al mägu, a type of ogre, and the omm negar, the bogeyman.

The omm salvädag, or "wild man," is a recurring character in tales from many areas of Northern Italy. He is a furtive, hairy humanoid that lives in the woods.

Rè da biss (King of Snakes) is the name given to a green whip snake or water snake that has undergone a mutation after being cut by a sickle while in the grass. The incident causes the remaining part of the body to grow enormously and develop a crest on its head.

Bargniff is the name of a fairy and entity that lives under bridges or in swamps near the Po River. It poses riddles to passersby late at night and throws those who cannot solve them into the water. Over time, the name has come to refer to the devil.

Tales featuring the fairy (fäta) are rare.

=== Cuisine ===
Piacenza's cuisine boasts several traditional dishes that have become well-known beyond the province, such as pisarei e faśö and Piacenza-style tortelli.Salumi play an important role in Piacenza's gastronomy. The three most famous varieties, designated as DOP products, are salame piacentino, coppa piacentina, and pancetta piacentina. Because of these products, Piacenza is the only Italian province with three DOP cured meats. Other cured meats that do not have DOP status include the mariola, a type of salami typical of the Val Nure, which is recognized as an Ark of Taste, as well as the salame gentile and lardo, which is used as an ingredient in several dishes when pounded with parsley (pistä 'd gras).

Cured meats are the mainstay of Piacenza appetizers. Other popular dishes include salame cotto, ciccioli (called graséi in Piacentino), Val Nure, Val Trebbia, and Val Tidone's bortellina (burtlëina in Piacentino), a type of flour fritter served with cured meats or cheeses, chisulén (fried cake), which is only typical of certain municipalities in the lower Val d'Arda but common in other Emilia-Romagna provinces, often under the name gnocco fritto and always served with cured meats, batarö (a focaccina from Val Tidone), fried polenta, and the potato cake from the upper Val Nure.

The most famous sauces include salsa di noci (ajà in Piacentino), Ligurian pesto, parsley sauce, and Farnese liver sauce. These sauces originated in the Apennines, an area influenced by Genoa and Liguria.

The first courses include the aforementioned pisarei e faśö, which are gnocchetti made from bread and flour with a bean sauce; tortelli alla piacentina; anolini (also known as anvëin), which are fresh pasta filled with a meat stew and served in broth; anolini in the Val d'Arda style, which is a variant of the aforementioned anolini in which the meat stew is replaced by cheese; pumpkin tortelli, which differ from those of Mantua and Cremona due to the absence of amaretti; chestnut tortelli, which are typical of the mountains; malfatti; and macaroni made with a knitting needle (also known as macaron cun l'agùcia), which is a specialty of Bobbio; mezze maniche dei frati, which are a type of large stuffed macaroni; tagliatelle or trofie with walnut sauce, which are typical of the mountains and Liguria; risotto alla primogenita; mushroom risotto; rice and cabbage with pork ribs; liver risotto; pig's tail risotto; and panzerotti alla piacentina, cylinders of fresh pasta baked and stuffed with ricotta, chard, and Grana Padano.

Roast duck and guinea fowl are very common second courses, as are the pìcula 'd cavall, the stracotto d'asina, the stracotto alla piacentina, the Bomba di Riso of Bobbio, the lumache alla bobbiese, the tasto or tasca (stuffed veal tip), a variant of the Cima alla Genovese, the delicate stewed eel, the marinated eel known as burattino or büratein, and the zucchini ripieni of the Apennines, which show clear Ligurian influences. Other second courses include stewed cod and polenta, which is available in several varieties, such as consa with layers of sauce and Grana cheese or ciccioli. Polenta is also served as an accompaniment to pìcula 'd cavall.

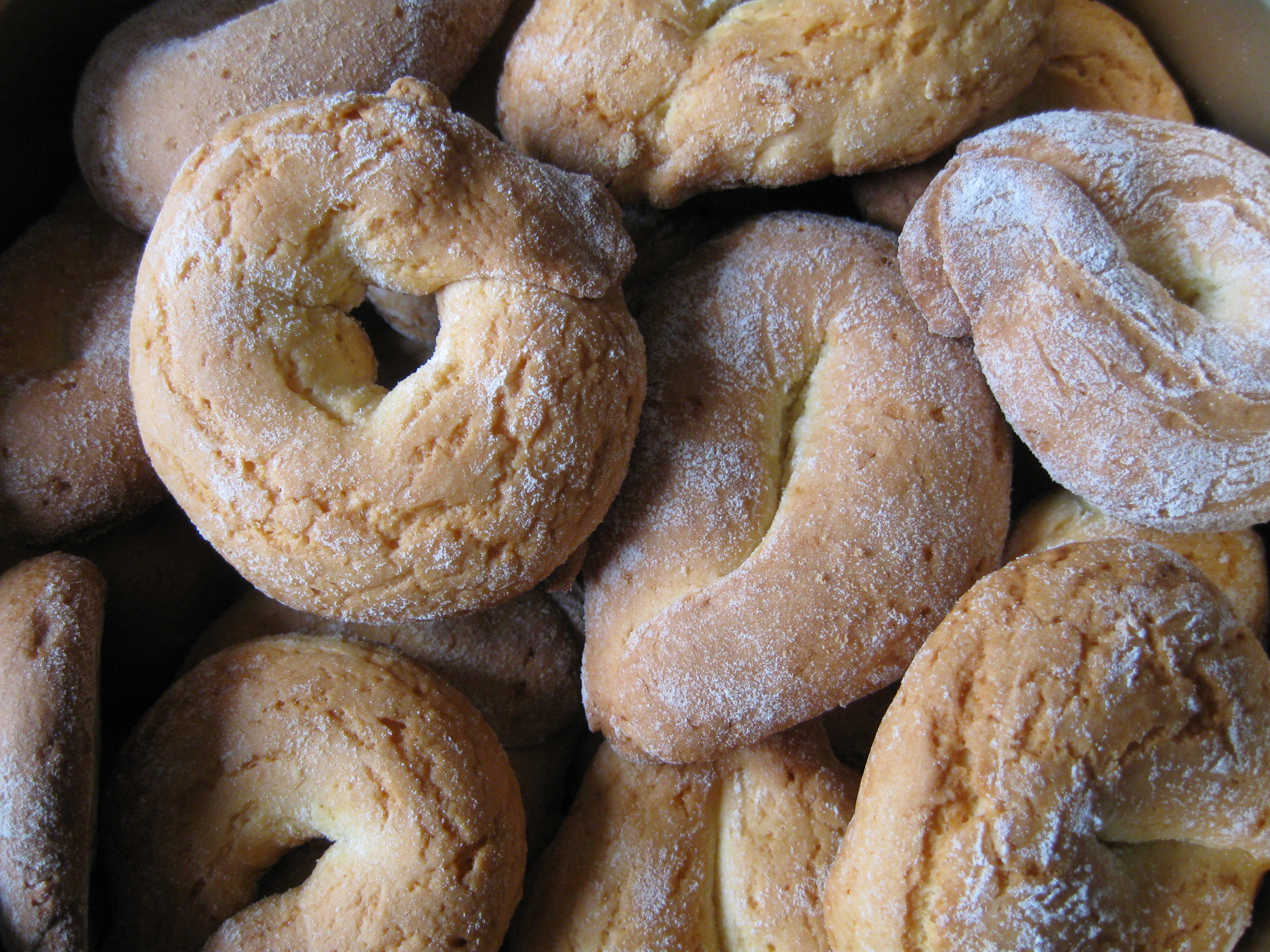
Homemade Buslanein

The D.O.P. cheeses are Grana Padano and Provolone Val Padana. In mountainous regions, cheeses are still produced using sheep, goat, and cow milk, including the cheese from which saltaréi worms emerge. The marketing of this cheese has been banned due to European directives, though it continues to be produced on a small scale.

Although there is not a strong tradition of pastries in the area, there are plenty of desserts. Examples include turtlìt (sweet tortelli), crostate, latte in piedi, buslān (doughnuts), buslanēin (doughnut rings), and spongata. The sbrisolona, a cake probably of Jewish origin, is widespread in the province of Parma, especially in the Val d'Arda area. The sbrisolona, which is originally from Mantua, is also a popular dessert in Piacenza and other areas of Lombardy and Emilia.

The city of Bobbio boasts a variety of local recipes, so much so that its cuisine is considered separate from that of the rest of the province in some cases.

=== Wines ===
Viticulture is also widespread in the Piacenza area. Records of viticulture in the area date back to the first millennium BCE, and the province is renowned for its wines. Several wines are produced within the Colli Piacentini DOC area, which occupies the hilly strip of the province from east to west. Thirty-one of the wines that are part of the Colli Piacentini DOC have obtained the controlled origin denomination and belong to 14 types: Monterosso Val d'Arda, Trebbianino Val Trebbia, Valnure, Barbera, Bonarda, Malvasia, Pinot Nero, Sauvignon, Chardonnay, Pinot Grigio, Vin Santo di Vigoleno, Novello, and Cabernet Sauvignon. These wines are joined by Gutturnio, which has a separate DOC recognizing five variants. The portion of the Val Versa territory under Piacenza's jurisdiction is within the DOCG area of the Oltrepò Pavese.

== Sights ==
=== Religious architecture ===
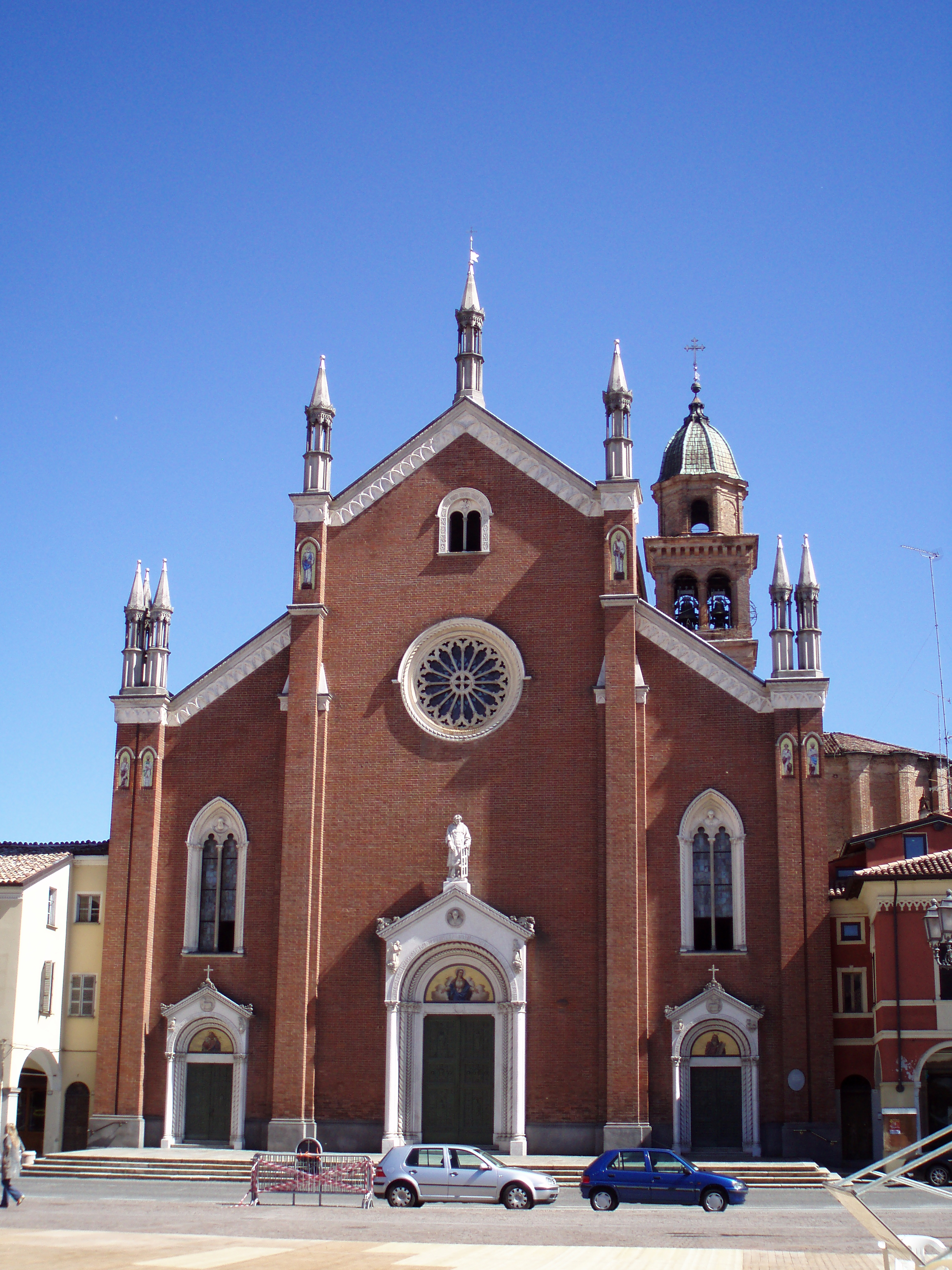
The Basilica of Santa Maria delle Grazie in Cortemaggiore

- Abbey of San Colombano in Bobbio (614), founded by Saint Columbanus, built in Romanesque style
- Piacenza Cathedral (1122-1233), mother church of the Diocese of Piacenza-Bobbio, built in Romanesque style.
- Bobbio Cathedral (11th century), co-cathedral of the Diocese of Piacenza-Bobbio, Romanesque style.
- Basilica of Santa Maria di Campagna in Piacenza (1522-1528) in Renaissance style, contains an extensive Mannerist pictorial cycle of the early 16th century by Pordenone and Baroque canvases by Guido Reni and the Procaccini.
- Basilica of Sant'Antonino in Piacenza (350-375) in Romanesque style, preserves the relics of Antoninus, a Christian martyr killed near Travo.
- Basilica of Santa Maria delle Grazie in Cortemaggiore (1480-1495), preserves inside a polyptych of twelve panels by Filippo Mazzola.
- Saint Lupo Sacellum in Albareto

=== Civil architecture ===
- Palazzo Comunale in Piacenza (1281), seat of the city government in the Middle Ages.
- Palazzo Farnese in Piacenza (16th century), commissioned by Duke Ottavio Farnese and designed by Vignola as a representative palace, incomplete due to the changed political conditions between the design and the interruption of works.

=== Military architecture ===
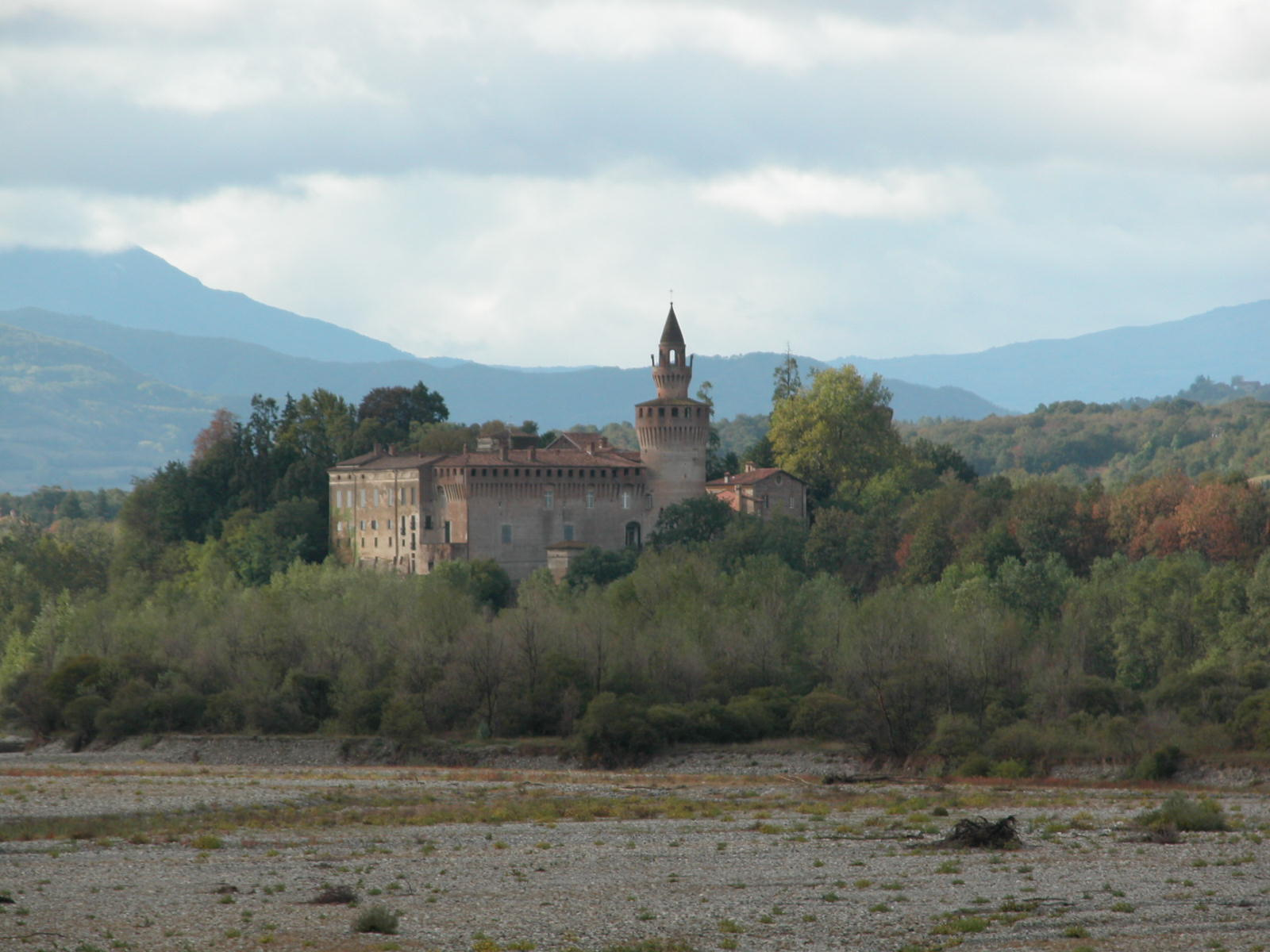
The Castle of Rivalta seen from the Trebbia

- Rivalta Castle, included in the homonymous fortified village in the municipality of Gazzola, guarding access to Val Trebbia from the plain.
- Grazzano Visconti Castle, fortress located in the municipality of Vigolzone built in 1395 by Giovanni Anguissola. It was passed to the Visconti di Modrone family in the 19th century and restored at the beginning of the 20th century by Count Giuseppe Visconti di Modrone. He commissioned the architect Alfredo Campanini to design a small, fortified village in a neo-medieval style.
- Visconti Rocca, built between 1342 and 1347 by the city of Piacenza first, and by the Visconti later. It dominates the fortified village of Castell'Arquato.
- Riva Castle, located on the right bank of the Nure stream, in the municipality of Ponte dell'Olio, between the watercourse and the road connecting Piacenza to Ferriere. It controlled the passage from the plain to the first reliefs of Val Nure.
- Vigoleno Castle, a fortified complex located in the western part of the province, in the municipality of Vernasca, near the border with Parma, was built in the 10th century and was destroyed repeatedly until it was rebuilt in its definitive form in 1389.

=== Archaeological sites ===
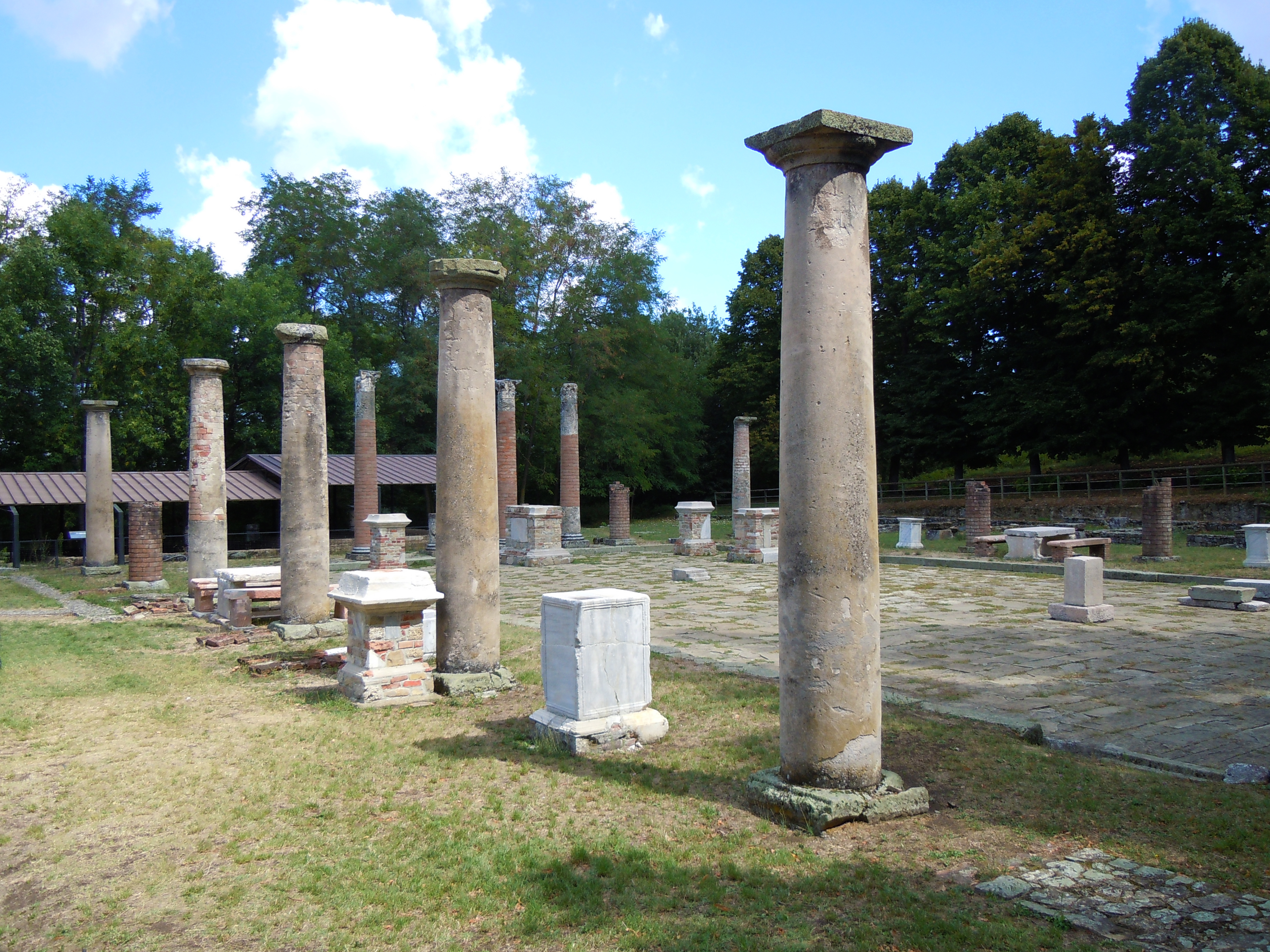
The archaeological excavations of Veleia

- The archaeological excavations in Veleia, located in the municipality of Lugagnano Val d'Arda, reveal the remains of a Roman municipium that began to fall into ruin in the 4th century; in 1747 the Tabula Alimentaria Traiana was found there, preserved at the National Archaeological Museum of Parma.
- The San Martino Plain, located in the municipality of Pianello Val Tidone, contains the remains of a prehistoric settlement from the Bronze and Iron Ages, as well as from late antiquity and the Middle Ages. The site was reburied in 2018 to ensure its conservation.

=== Natural areas ===
- Oasi de Pinedo, in the municipality of Caorso, an area protected by the Provincial Territorial Coordination Plan and the Regional Landscape Plan. It is located in the protection belt of the nuclear power plant and for this reason it has been preserved. It consists of floodplain areas containing oxbow lakes, reed beds, riparian woodlands, and remnants of lowland vegetation.
- Parco di Isola Giarola, located in the municipality of Villanova sull'Arda, was created following the restoration of a quarry. The renovated banks are now home to the flora and fauna of riparian wetlands.
- Monte Moria Provincial Park, located between the municipalities of Lugagnano Val d'Arda and Morfasso with an extension of more than 10 square kilometers. It was founded in the 1920s to promote forest heritage.
- Stirone and Piacenziano Regional Park, located within the municipalities of Alseno, Castell'Arquato, Carpaneto Piacentino, Gropparello, Lugagnano val d'Arda, Vernasca, Fidenza and Salsomaggiore Terme (the last two in the Province of Parma), established in 2011 with a regional law uniting the two parks of the Stirone and the Piacenziano. The park contains Tertiary and Quaternary era fossil remains brought to light by erosion.
- Trebbia Regional Fluvial Park, includes the entire lower course of the Trebbia from Rivergaro to the confluence in the Po, for a total of 4,049 hectares characterized by a fluvial environment that alternates periods of flood with periods of drought in which the river divides into several parts in the pebble-covered riverbed.

== Institutions ==
=== Healthcare ===
The most important healthcare center in the province is the Piacenza hospital. The main provincial hospital facilities are as follows:

- "Guglielmo da Saliceto" Hospital of Piacenza (Piacenza Hospital Area);
- Hospital of Fiorenzuola d'Arda (Val d'Arda Hospital Area);
- Hospital of Castel San Giovanni (Valtidone Hospital Area);
- Hospital of Bobbio (Mountain Hospital Area).

== Education ==
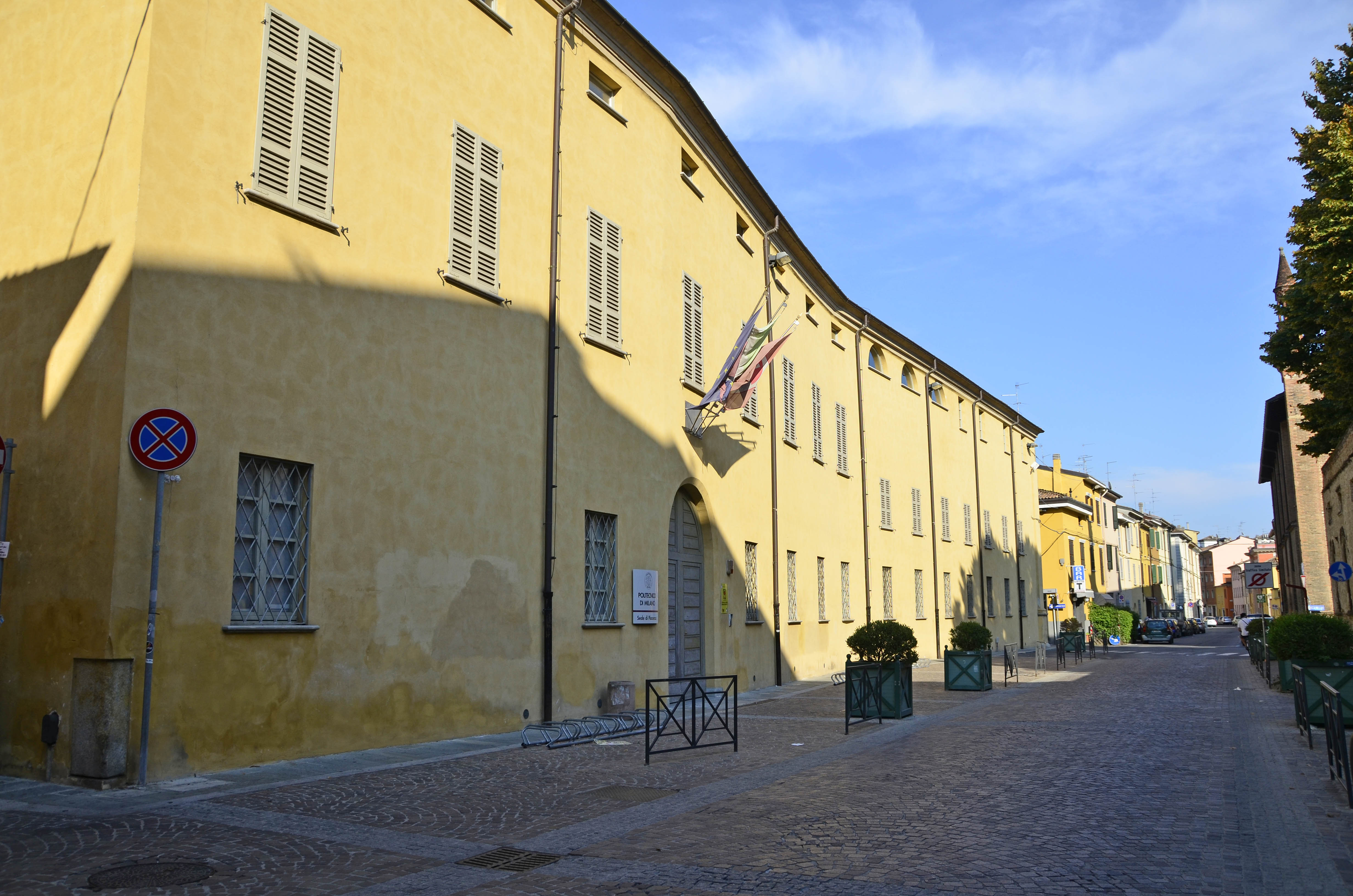
The Piacenza campus of the Polytechnic University of Milan

The university campuses in the province are concentrated in the capital, where the Catholic University of the Sacred Heart of Milan has a campus with faculties of economics, law, agricultural sciences, food sciences, environmental sciences, and education sciences; the Polytechnic University of Milan has a campus with degree programs in engineering and architecture; and the University of Parma has an off-campus degree program in nursing. Until 2018, the same campus that offered the nursing program also offered the physiotherapy program. In the fall of that year, however, the program moved to a new campus in Fiorenzuola d'Arda. Piacenza is also home to the Giuseppe Nicolini Conservatory and the Alberoni College of Theology, which is affiliated with the Faculty of Theology at the Pontifical University of Saint Thomas Aquinas in Rome.

== Museums ==
The main museums in the province include:

=== Museums in Piacenza ===
- The Civic Museums of Palazzo Farnese are housed in the Vignola Palace and are divided into sections dedicated to the Middle Ages, the Renaissance, the Farnesian Glories, glass and ceramics, paintings, weapons, carriages, archaeology, and the Risorgimento. The Liver of Piacenza is preserved there.
- The Natural History Museum is located in the Urban Center until January 2025. The Urban Center is an area redeveloped from the former city slaughterhouse. The museum temporarily closed on that date in anticipation of moving to a new location. The museum was divided into rooms dedicated to the province of Piacenza's plain, hilly, and mountainous environments.
- The Ricci Oddi Gallery is an art gallery that opened in 1931. It houses a collection of works from the private collection gathered by Giuseppe Ricci Oddi starting in 1898. The collection dates from 1830 to 1930.
- Alberoni College is a vast architectural complex that includes an art gallery, an astronomical observatory, a museum of natural sciences, and a library.

=== Museums in the province ===
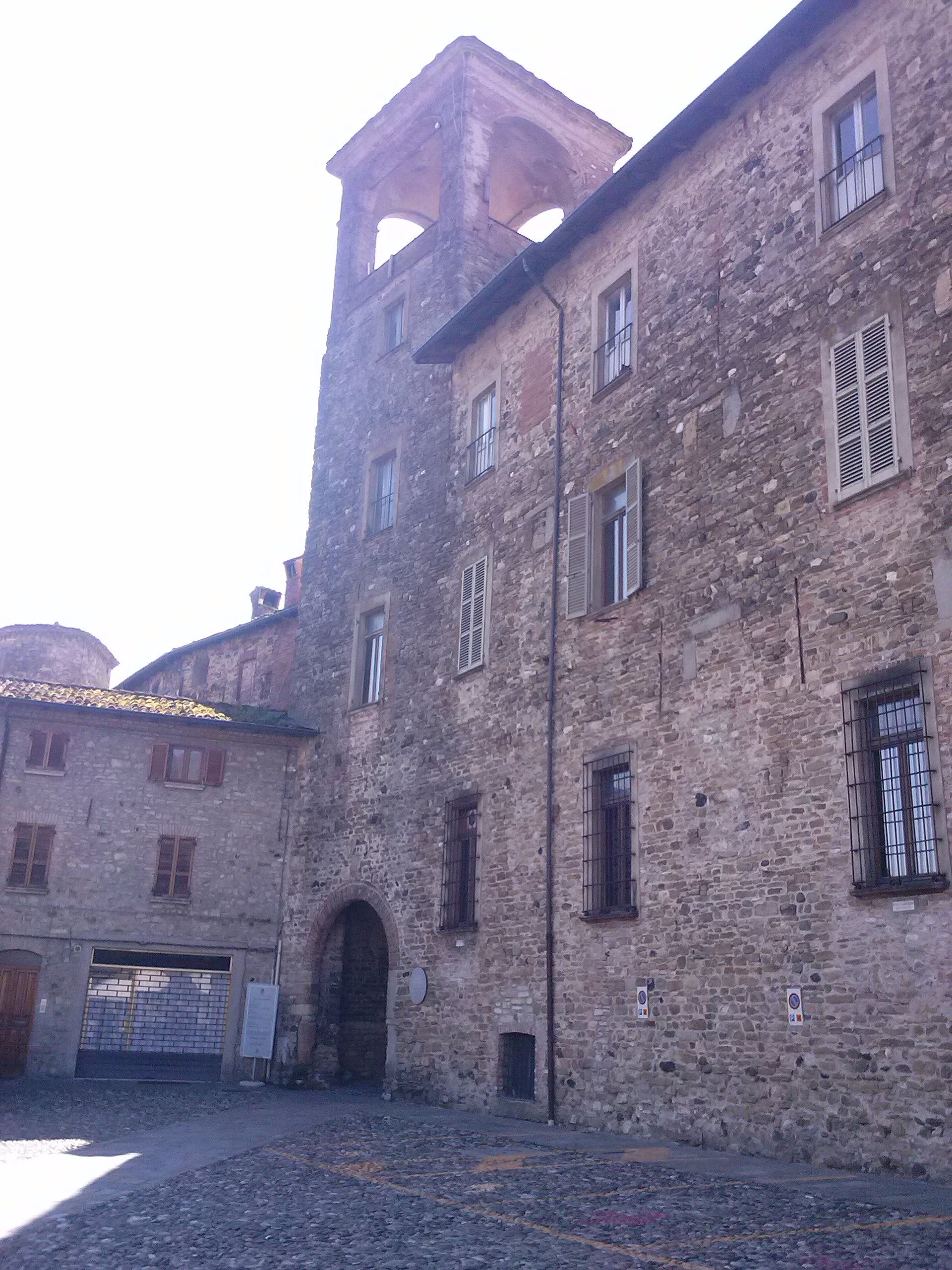
The Anguissola Castle in Travo, home to the archaeological museum

- The Museum of the Abbey of San Colombano in Bobbio is located in the part of the monastery that originally housed the library and scriptorium. It contains artifacts related to the history of the town, the abbey, and the cult of Saint Columbanus. The museum's collection spans from the Roman era to the Renaissance.
- The Mazzolini Collection Museum of Bobbio is a modern and contemporary art gallery located inside the Abbey of San Colombano. The museum houses 899 works of 20th-century art from the private collection of Domenica Rosa Mazzolini, including pieces by Giorgio de Chirico and Fiorenzo Tomea.
- The Val Tidone Archaeological Museum, located in Pianello Val Tidone, is housed in the basement of the Municipal Rocca. It preserves numerous artifacts discovered in the Val Tidone and neighboring valleys.
- The Archaeological Museum of Travo, located in the Anguissola Castle, houses artifacts collected by the cultural research group "La Minerva" in collaboration with the Archaeological Superintendence of Emilia-Romagna from 175 archaeological sites in the Val Trebbia.
- The Museum of the City of Bobbio is also housed in a wing of the San Colombano Abbey and contains artifacts related to the saint and the activities of the scriptorium.
- The Diocesan Museum of Bobbio is located in the Episcopal Palace.
- The Val Trebbia Ethnographic Museum in Callegari di Bobbio features a collection of traditional objects and customs. The exhibition showcases traditional trades linked to the rural economy of the valley.
- The G. Cortesi Geological Museum of Castell'Arquato contains the remains of a fossilized cetacean found in 1934 in the badlands of Monte Falcone, the skull of a whale discovered in 1983 in Tabiano di Lugagnano, and a collection of fossilized mollusks.
- The Piacenza Resistance Museum, located in Sperongia di Morfasso, houses artifacts and documents related to the resistance movement in the Piacenza area.

== Economy ==
=== Agriculture ===
The milk sector is one of the focal points of agriculture in Piacenza, with 24 operating companies and nearly 400 employees. The main product made with Piacenza milk is Grana Padano cheese. Another important supply chain is that of cured meats, with production concentrated on three DOP products: coppa piacentina, salame piacentino, and pancetta piacentina. Piacenza is also a leader in tomato production, a tradition celebrated at the OroRosso festival. Finally, viticulture is highly developed in Piacenza, with 36 DOCs protected by the Consortium for the Protection of Colli Piacentini Wines, which is headquartered in the city.

=== Industry ===
Piacenza is home to many companies in the machine tool sector. There are over 100 companies in this sector that employ a total of 2,500 people. These companies operate in the fields of machine tools for mechanical processing by chip removal, automation, specialized equipment and components, technical services, and research and development. The city is also home to the MUSP laboratory, which studies machine tools and production systems.

Pipe fittings are another highly developed sector in Piacenza. They have been present in the city since the late 1930s, when the city arsenal's gun barrel department was founded. In total, 15 joint-stock companies in the Piacenza region produce forged fittings.

=== Services ===
Thanks to its proximity to industrial areas in the Po Valley and important communication routes, including railways and highways, various logistics hubs have developed in the province of Piacenza since the 2000s. One hub is located in the capital city's Le Mose frazione, near the Piacenza Sud motorway toll booth. Companies such as Unieuro, Italiarredo, and IKEA have settled there. The Piacenza hub also aims to be the preferred logistics platform for the Port of La Spezia. To this end, a memorandum of understanding was signed in July 2015 between the municipality and the Ligurian port authority. Another hub is in Castel San Giovanni, where companies such as Conad, Bosch, LG Electronics, and Amazon have settled, exploiting the proximity to Milan. This hub covers a total area of 1,300,000 m². Finally, there is a hub in Monticelli d'Ongina, where Whirlpool and Enel are among the companies present, covering 144,500 m².

The exhibition center, completed in 2000, is located a short distance from the capital's logistics hub. It consists of three exhibition pavilions, covering 14,000 square meters, as well as an outdoor area of 7,000 square meters, two conference rooms, and a training room.

=== Tourism ===
The capital was part of the Circuit of Art Cities of the Po Plain together with other Lombard and Emilian cities until its dissolution in 2018. In 2015, the province recorded 222,938 arrivals for a total of 444,944 visitors, approximately half of whom were in the capital city. The province's main tourist attractions are its cuisine and castles, some of which are included in the Castles of the Duchy. The Bobbio area offers cross-country ski trails and ski lifts for alpine skiing.

== Transport ==
=== Roads ===
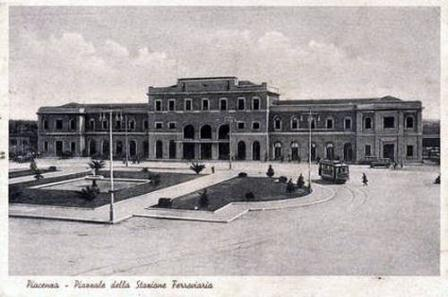
The capital's station in 1939

The province of Piacenza is crossed by six state roads: the Strada Statale 45 di Val Trebbia which leads to Genoa passing through Bobbio and the Val Trebbia, the Strada Statale 9 Via Emilia which connects Milan to Rimini, the Strada Statale 10 Padana Inferiore which connects Turin to Monselice, the Strada Statale 725 Tangenziale di Piacenza, the Strada Statale 412 della Val Tidone which from Milan reaches Castel San Giovanni and continues ascending the Val Tidone up to the Passo del Penice, the Strada Statale 461 del Passo del Penice, which connects Bobbio to Voghera passing through the Passo del Penice, and the Strada Statale 654 di Val Nure which connects Piacenza to Rezzoaglio ascending the Val Nure.

Other roads that were formerly state roads and were subsequently transferred to the province include the SP 359 R di Salsomaggiore e di Bardi, the SP 462 R della Val d'Arda, the SP 586 R della Valle dell'Aveto, the SP 587 R di Cortemaggiore, and the SP 588 R dei Due Ponti.

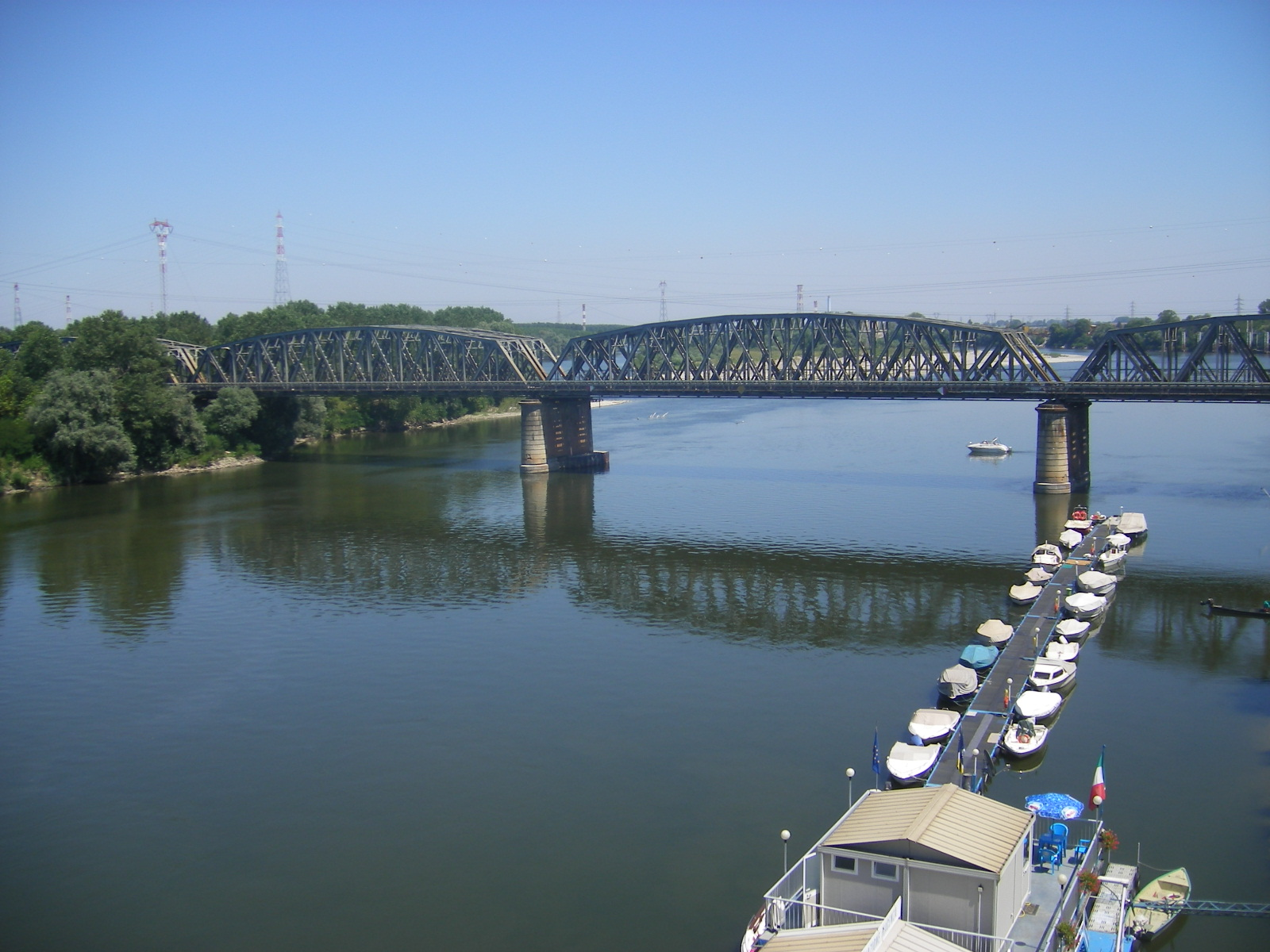
The railway bridge over the Po river

The province is also crossed by two motorways: the A1 Milan-Naples on which the Piacenza Sud and Fiorenzuola toll booths are located, the Basso Lodigiano toll booth, previously known as Piacenza Nord and also serving the capital, is instead located within the municipality of Guardamiglio, adjacent to the capital, but located in the province of Lodi and the A21 Turin-Piacenza-Brescia on which the Castelsangiovanni, Piacenza Ovest, Piacenza Sud, Caorso and Castelvetro toll booths are located.

=== Railways and tramways ===
The main railway hub is located in the capital city. It is situated on the Milan–Bologna railway and is the terminus of the lines to Alessandria and Cremona. The latter has not had passenger traffic since December 2013.

The province is crossed by the Cremona–Fidenza railway and the Milan–Bologna high-speed railway, though the latter has no stations in the province. The Piacenza–Bettola railway, which connected the capital with mid Val Nure, was active between 1932 and 1967. Despite passenger protests, it was shut down due to the deficit accumulated by the managing company.

From 1881 to 1938, the province was characterized by an extensive interurban steam tram network. SIFT operated this network from 1908 and it included the following lines:

- Cremona–Lugagnano tramway (1900-1923);
- Grazzano–Rivergaro tramway (1886-1934);
- Piacenza–Bettola tramway (1881-1933);
- Piacenza–Cremona tramway (1882-1935);
- Piacenza–Pianello–Nibbiano tramway (1893-1938)
- Piacenza–Agazzano tramway (1907-1933);
- Piacenza–Lugagnano tramway (1897-1938).

Furthermore, the capital was served by an electric urban tramway network from 1908, which reached San Rocco al Porto in 1924. The tramways were discontinued in 1955 and replaced by bus lines operated by Auto Guidovie Italiane.

=== Airports ===
The Piacenza Air Base is located in the municipality of San Giorgio Piacentino. Until September 2016, it was the seat of the 50th Wing of the Italian Air Force. Since that date, it has been the Piacenza Airport Command, supporting the operational structures of the air force.

=== Urban and extra-urban mobility ===
SETA manages public transportation in the city and province.

== Sport ==
Piacenza was the main soccer team in the province and played in Serie A for eight seasons. Following the team's bankruptcy in 2011, Piacenza Calcio 1919 became the city's most popular team. Considered the heir of Piacenza FC, it plays in Serie D. The team plays its home matches at the Stadio Leonardo Garilli, as Piacenza FC previously did. Another soccer club from the city that reached the professional level was Pro Piacenza. It played in the third national division five times before being expelled from the championship due to financial problems in the 2018–19 season. Outside of the capital, the main club is Fiorenzuola. They reached the 1995 playoff final for promotion to Serie B. In the 1940s, Olubra of Castel San Giovanni played in Serie C for several seasons.

Piacenza is represented in volleyball by the men's team of You Energy Volley, which plays in the SuperLega. Founded in 2018, the team replaced Pallavolo Piacenza, a club that won one Scudetto, one Coppa Italia, one Italian Supercup, and two European Cups. Previously, River Volley's women's team represented Piacenza. Founded in Rivergaro, River Volley moved to Piacenza, where it won two Italian Championships. In 2016, the team moved to Modena and was permanently dissolved in 2018.

The Unione Cestistica Piacentina basketball team was formed from the merger of the Piacenza and Fiorenzuola teams. They played in the Legadue championship in the 2011–12 season but failed to register for the following season and subsequently went bankrupt. After UCP dissolved, Pallacanestro Piacentina (which plays in Serie B) and Piacenza Basket Club (which merged with UC Casalpusterlengo in 2016) began representing basketball in Piacenza. The latter team brought the Lodi team to play its Serie A2 championship matches in Piacenza.

Piacenza is home to several rugby union teams, including the two most prominent ones: Piacenza Rugby Club, which plays in Serie B, and Rugby Lyons Piacenza, which plays in Top10. These teams have won multiple championships in the top division.

== Bibliography ==
- Albini, Giuliana (1984). "Famiglie piacentine nella società spagnola e portoghese dei secoli XIV e XV. Prime indagini" [Piacenza families in Spanish and Portuguese society in the 14th and 15th centuries. Initial investigations]. Studi storici. 62 (4). Università degli Studi di Milano: 969–990. doi:10.54125/2281844X_62_4_2021_05 (inactive 18 August 2026).
- Ambrogio, Aldo (1955). ""Le tradizioni", Panorami di Piacenza". Piacenza: Tip. Leg. Scuola Artigiana del Libro.
- Anceschi, Alessio (2021). L'Emilia, la Romagna e l'alta Toscana. Storia dei confini d'Italia [Emilia, Romagna, and northern Tuscany. History of Italy's borders]. Torino: Edizioni del Capricorno.
- Artocchini, Carmen (1999). Tradizioni popolari piacentine - Vol. I - La ruota del tempo [Popular traditions of Piacenza - Vol. I - The wheel of time]. Piacenza: Tep.
- Artocchini, Carmen (2006). Tradizioni popolari piacentine - Vol. IV - La fede, il mistero, l'occulto [Popular traditions of Piacenza - Vol. IV - Faith, mystery, the occult]. Piacenza: Tep.
- Barabaschi, Eleonora (2021). Val Nure dall'alto [Val Nure from above]. Piacenza: Tip.Le.Co.
- Bearesi, Luigi (1982). Piccolo Dizionario del Dialetto Piacentino [Small Dictionary of the Piacenza Dialect]. Piacenza: Editrice Berti.
- Boreri, Aldo (1939). Le bellezze dei monti di Ferriere [The beauty of the Ferriere mountains]. Piacenza: Tipografia Editoriale Porta.
- Bougard, François (1989). "Entre Gandolfinigi et Obertenghi: les comtes de Plaisance aux Xe et XIe siècles" [Between Gandolfinigi and Obertenghi: the counts of Piacenza in the 10th and 11th centuries]. Mélanges de l'École française de Rome: Moyen Âge (in French). 101 (1): 11–66. doi:10.3406/mefr.1989.3019.
- Cacozza, Marco (April 2008). "La Ferrovia Piacenza-Bettola". Tutto Treno & Storia. No. 19. Ponte San Nicolò: Duegi Editrice. pp. 50–65.
- Clerici, Enrico; Costa, Elvy (2001). Appunti per una storia di Moncasacco [Notes for a history of Moncasacco]. Moncasacco.
- Conversi, Roberta; Destefanis, Eleonora (2015). "Archeologia Medievale. Cultura materiale, insediamenti, territorio" [Medieval Archaeology. Material culture, settlements, territory]. Archeologia Medievale. XLI. Firenze: All'Insegna del Giglio: 292–301. ISBN 978-88-7814-642-6.
- Dalbosco, Alberto; Brughi, Carla (1993). Entità fatate della Padania [Fairy entities of Padania]. Milano: Edizioni della Terra di mezzo.
- Dall'Acqua, Marzio (2001). Ducati d'Emilia, signorie di Romagna [Duchies of Emilia, lordships of Romagna]. Milano: Touring Club Italiano.
- D’Esposito, Francesco. Notai e commercio internazionale a Siviglia nell'epoca dei Re Cattolici [Notaries and international trade in Seville during the era of the Catholic Monarchs].
- Di Stefano, Mario; Tammi, Ernesto (1979). Studi sulla comunicazione orale piacentina [Studies on oral communication in Piacenza]. Piacenza: Tep.
- Favari, Mario (1989). Il libro dei giochi dimenticati [The Book of Forgotten Games]. Piacenza: Tip.Le.Co.
- Fornasari, Paola. La Provincia di Piacenza e il suo archivio - 1860-1970 [The Province of Piacenza and its archives - 1860-1970] (PDF). Provincia di Piacenza. Archived from the original (PDF) on 17 March 2022.
- Grossetti, Elena (2008). "Il sito archeologico della Piana di San Martino (PC): una sintesi dei risultati acquisiti" [The archaeological site of Piana di San Martino (PC): a summary of the results obtained] (PDF). Archeologia Uomo Territorio (27): 15–24. Archived from the original (PDF) on 22 December 2014.
- Diplomata Ottonis. III. Vol. 250. M.G.H.
- Musina, Giorgia (2012). Le campagne di Piacenza tra VII e IX secolo: insediamenti e comunità [The countryside around Piacenza between the 7th and 9th centuries: settlements and communities] (PDF).
- Nasalli Rocca, Emilio (1955). "Economia". In Emilio Nasalli Rocca (ed.). Panorami di Piacenza [Panoramas of Piacenza]. Piacenza: Tip. Leg. Scuola Artigiana del Libro.
- Novesconi, Armando (1981). Castelli intorno a Lodi [Castles around Lodi]. Lodi: Banca Popolare di Lodi.
- Ogliari, Francesco; Sapi, Franco (1969). Ritmi di ruote. Storia dei trasporti italiani volume 10°. Emilia-Romagna [Wheel rhythms. History of Italian transport, volume 10. Emilia-Romagna]. Milano.
- Massimo Montanari, Maurizio Ridolfi, Renato Zangheri, Storia dell'Emilia romagna. Dalle origini al Seicento, vol. I, Editori Laterza, Bari, 2004
- Paraboschi, Luigi; Bergonzi, Andrea (2016). Prontuario ortografico piacentino [Piacenza spelling guide]. Piacenza: Ed. Banca di Piacenza.
- Pellegrini, Giovan Battista (1990). Toponomastica italiana. 10.000 nomi di città, paesi, frazioni, regioni, contrade, monti spiegati nella loro origine e storia [Italian place names. 10,000 names of cities, towns, villages, regions, districts, and mountains explained in terms of their origin and history.]. Milano: Hoepli.
- Percivaldi, Elena (2021). Sulle tracce dei Longobardi. Italia Settentrionale [On the trail of the Lombards. Northern Italy]. Torino: Edizioni del Capricorno.
- Piano territoriale di coordinamento provinciale - All. B1.8 (R) La revisione delle fasce fluviali [Provincial Territorial Coordination Plan - Annex B1.8 (R) Revision of river zones] (PDF). Provincia di Piacenza. October 2007.
- Poleis Consulting. Le Unioni in Emilia-Romagna - Uno sguardo d'insieme al sistema delle gestioni associate [Unions in Emilia-Romagna - An overview of the joint management system] (PDF).
- Rinaldi, Rossella (2004). "I Longobardi e i Franchi". Storia dell'Emilia Romagna. Dalle origini al Seicento [History of Emilia Romagna. From its origins to the seventeenth century]. Vol. I. Bari: Editori Laterza.
- Rossi, Anton-Domenico (1829). Ristretto di storia patria ad uso de' piacentini [A brief history of the homeland for the people of Piacenza]. Vol. I. Piacenza: Del Maino.
- Sterpos, Daniele (1959). Comunicazioni stradali attraverso i tempi. Milano-Piacenza-Bologna [Road communications through the ages. Milan-Piacenza-Bologna]. Novara: Istituto Geografico De Agostini.
- Tammi, Guido (1998). Vocabolario Piacentino-Italiano [Piacentino-Italian vocabulary]. Piacenza: Ed. Banca di Piacenza.
- Vignati, Cesare (1981) [1859]. Storia di Lodi e il suo territorio [History of Lodi and its territory]. Bornato in Franciacorta: Fausto Sardini Editore e Stampatore.
