= Rivergaro =

- Comune
- Comune di Rivergaro
- Location within Italy Location within Emilia-Romagna
- Coordinates: 44°54′N 9°36′E
- Country: Italy
- Region: Emilia-Romagna
- Province: Province of Piacenza (PC)

Government
  - Mayor: Andrea Gatti

Area
  - Total: 43.8 km^{2} (16.9 sq mi)

Population (Dec. 2011)
  - Total: 6,843
  - Density: 156/km^{2} (405/sq mi)
- Time zone: UTC+1 (CET)
  - Summer (DST): UTC+2 (CEST)
- Postal code: 29029
- Dialing code: 0523
- Website: Official website

Rivergaro (Piacentino: Arvargär) is a comune (municipality) in the Province of Piacenza in the Italian region Emilia-Romagna, located about 150 kilometres (93 mi) northwest of Bologna and about 20 kilometres (12 mi) southwest of Piacenza. As of 31 December 2011, it had a population of 6,843 and an area of 43.8 square kilometres (16.9 mi^{2}).

Localities include Ancarano di Sopra, Fabbiano, Larzano, Rallio, Niviano, Ottavello, Pieve Dugliara, Rivergaro, Roveleto Landi, Suzzano, and Case Buschi.

The Medieval Castello di Montechiaro (castle of Montechiaro) is located in the locality of Rallio.

Rivergaro borders the following municipalities: Gazzola, Gossolengo, Podenzano, Travo, and Vigolzone.

== Demographic evolution ==
Historical population

Year	Pop.	±%
1861	3,721	—
1871	4,050	+8.8%
1881	4,362	+7.7%
1901	4,773	+9.4%
1911	5,129	+7.5%

Year	Pop.	±%
1921	5,303	+3.4%
1931	4,963	−6.4%
1936	4,888	−1.5%
1951	4,947	+1.2%
1961	4,298	−13.1%

Year	Pop.	±%
1971	3,864	−10.1%
1981	4,097	+6.0%
1991	4,777	+16.6%
2001	5,507	+15.3%

Source: Data from ISTAT
