= Farini, Emilia-Romagna =

Farini
- Comune
- Comune di Farini
- Location within Italy Location within Emilia-Romagna
- Coordinates: 44°43′N 9°34′E
- Country: Italy
- Region: Emilia-Romagna
- Province: Province of Piacenza (PC)

Government
  - Mayor: Marco Paganelli

Area
  - Total: 112.0 km^{2} (43.2 sq mi)

Population (Dec. 2004)
  - Total: 1,744
  - Density: 15.57/km^{2} (40.33/sq mi)
- Time zone: UTC+1 (CET)
  - Summer (DST): UTC+2 (CEST)
- Postal code: 29023
- Dialing code: 0523
- Website: Official website

Farini (Piacentino: I Farëin or I Farén) is a comune (municipality) in the Province of Piacenza in the Italian region Emilia-Romagna, located about 140 kilometres (87 mi) west of Bologna and about 40 kilometres (25 mi) southwest of Piacenza. As of 31 December 2004, it had a population of 1,744 and an area of 112.0 square kilometres (43.2 mi^{2}). In September 2015, Farini suffered a major flood due to heavy rain.

Farini borders the following municipalities: Bardi, Bettola, Coli, Ferriere, Morfasso.

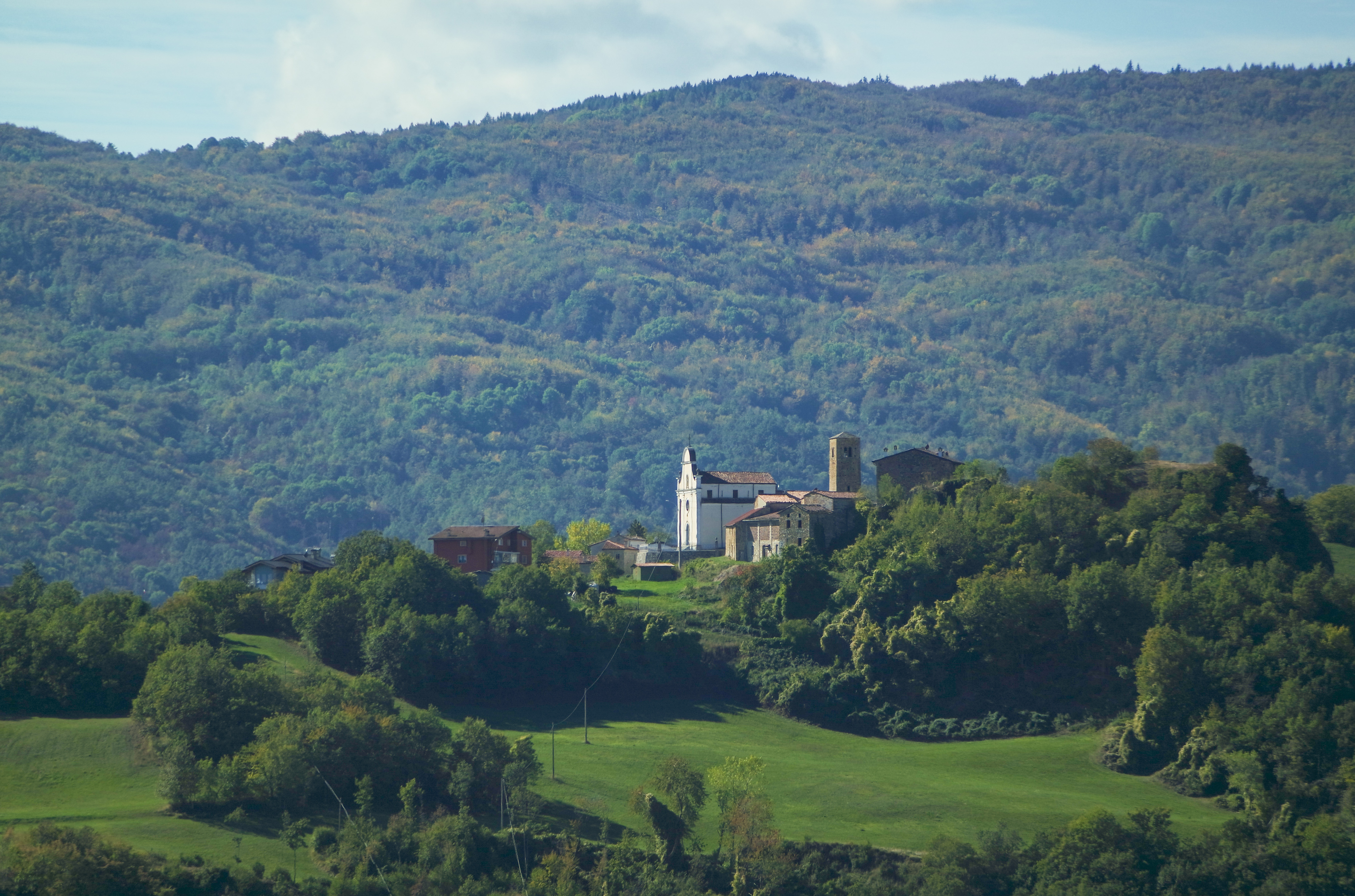
partial view of the town of Farini

== Demographic evolution ==
Historical population

Year	Pop.	±%
1861	6,235	—
1871	6,272	+0.6%
1881	6,712	+7.0%
1901	6,187	−7.8%
1911	7,479	+20.9%

Year	Pop.	±%
1921	8,014	+7.2%
1931	6,791	−15.3%
1936	5,996	−11.7%
1951	5,710	−4.8%
1961	5,021	−12.1%

Year	Pop.	±%
1971	3,366	−33.0%
1981	2,770	−17.7%
1991	2,326	−16.0%
2001	1,881	−19.1%

Source: Data from ISTAT

== Twin towns ==
Farini is twinned with:

- Nogent-sur-Marne, France, since 1983
