= San Pietro in Cerro =

- Comune
- Comune di San Pietro in Cerro
- Coat of arms

- Location within Italy Location within Emilia-Romagna
- Coordinates: 45°1′N 9°57′E
- Country: Italy
- Region: Emilia-Romagna
- Province: Province of Piacenza (PC)

Government
  - Mayor: Stefano Boselli

Area
  - Total: 27.5 km^{2} (10.6 sq mi)

Population (Dec. 2004)
  - Total: 962
  - Density: 35.0/km^{2} (90.6/sq mi)
- Time zone: UTC+1 (CET)
  - Summer (DST): UTC+2 (CEST)
- Postal code: 29010
- Dialing code: 0523
- Website: Official website

San Pietro in Cerro (Piacentino: San Pédar) is a comune (municipality) in the Province of Piacenza in the Italian region Emilia-Romagna, located about 120 kilometres (75 mi) northwest of Bologna and about 20 kilometres (12 mi) east of Piacenza. As of 31 December 2004, it had a population of 962 and an area of 27.5 square kilometres (10.6 mi^{2}).

San Pietro in Cerro borders the following municipalities: Caorso, Cortemaggiore, Monticelli d'Ongina, Villanova sull'Arda.

== Demographic evolution ==
Historical population

| Year | Pop. | ±% |
|---|---|---|
| 1861 | 2,215 | — |
| 1871 | 2,328 | +5.1% |
| 1881 | 2,217 | −4.8% |
| 1901 | 2,254 | +1.7% |
| 1911 | 2,412 | +7.0% |

| Year | Pop. | ±% |
|---|---|---|
| 1921 | 2,544 | +5.5% |
| 1931 | 2,447 | −3.8% |
| 1936 | 2,455 | +0.3% |
| 1951 | 2,320 | −5.5% |
| 1961 | 2,092 | −9.8% |

| Year | Pop. | ±% |
|---|---|---|
| 1971 | 1,475 | −29.5% |
| 1981 | 1,186 | −19.6% |
| 1991 | 1,001 | −15.6% |
| 2001 | 957 | −4.4% |

Source: Data from ISTAT
