= Gossolengo =

- Comune
- Comune di Gossolengo
- Coat of arms

- Location within Italy Location within Emilia-Romagna
- Coordinates: 45°0′N 9°37′E
- Country: Italy
- Region: Emilia-Romagna
- Province: Piacenza (PC)
- Frazioni: Caratta, Quarto, Settima

Government
  - Mayor: Andrea Balestrieri

Area
  - Total: 31.5 km^{2} (12.2 sq mi)

Population (Dec. 2004)
  - Total: 4,197
  - Density: 133/km^{2} (345/sq mi)
- Time zone: UTC+1 (CET)
  - Summer (DST): UTC+2 (CEST)
- Postal code: 29020
- Dialing code: 0523
- Website: Official website

Gossolengo (Piacentino: Uslëing [usˈləi̯g] or Urslëing) is a comune (municipality) in the province of Piacenza in the Italian region Emilia-Romagna, located about 150 kilometres (93 mi) northwest of Bologna and about 9 kilometres (6 mi) southwest of Piacenza, in the valley of the Trebbia river.

Gossolengo borders the following municipalities: Gazzola, Gragnano Trebbiense, Piacenza, Podenzano, Rivergaro.

The area's economy is traditionally based on agriculture, thought the vicinity to Piacenza has boosted a considerable industrial and construction boom in recent times.

The Etruscan artifact dubbed "Liver of Piacenza" was found in the nearby in 1877.

== Demographic evolution ==
Historical population

Year	Pop.	±%
1861	2,013	—
1871	2,346	+16.5%
1881	2,487	+6.0%
1901	2,619	+5.3%
1911	2,913	+11.2%

Year	Pop.	±%
1921	3,218	+10.5%
1931	3,114	−3.2%
1936	2,954	−5.1%
1951	3,293	+11.5%
1961	3,065	−6.9%

Year	Pop.	±%
1971	2,224	−27.4%
1981	2,332	+4.9%
1991	2,907	+24.7%
2001	3,763	+29.4%

Source: Data from ISTAT
