= Monte Lesima =

Mountain in Italy

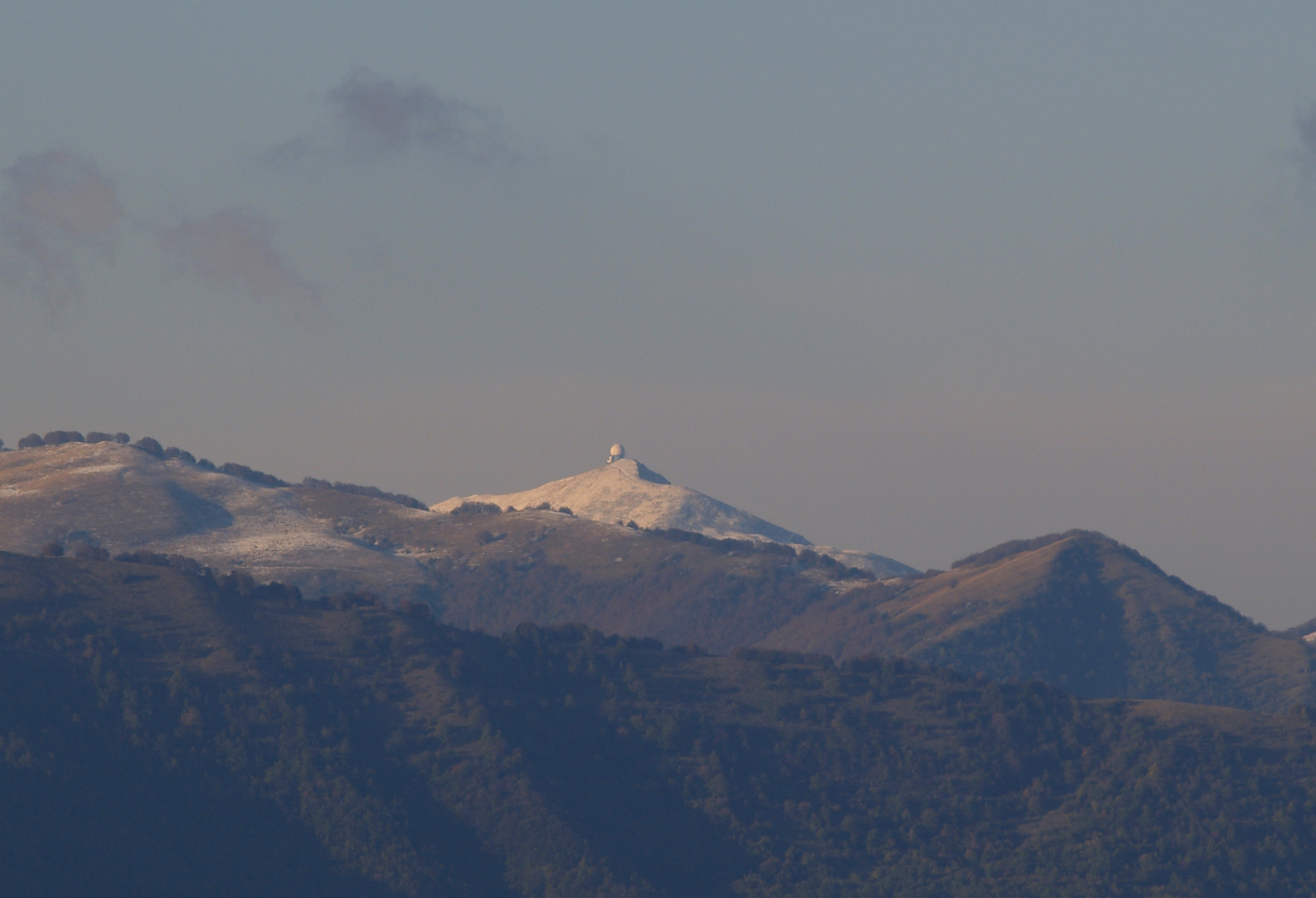

Highest point
- Elevation: 1,724 m (5,656 ft)
- Prominence: 848 m (2,782 ft)
- Isolation: 22.93 km (14.25 mi)
- Coordinates: 44°40′47″N 9°15′35″E

Geography
- Location within Italy
- Location: Lombardy / Emilia-Romagna, Italy
- Parent range: Liguran Apennine

Monte Lesima is a mountain of the Apennines.

== Geography ==
The mountain is located on the border between Province of Pavia (Lombardy) and Province of Piacenza (Emilia-Romagna), Italy. It has an elevation of 1,724 metres. On its top near a big summit cross stands a radar station.
