= Villanova sull'Arda =

- Comune
- Comune di Villanova sull'Arda
- Coat of arms

- Location within Italy Location within Emilia-Romagna
- Coordinates: 45°2′N 10°0′E
- Country: Italy
- Region: Emilia-Romagna
- Province: Piacenza (PC)
- Frazioni: Cignano, Sant'Agata, Soarza

Government
  - Mayor: Romano Freddi

Area
  - Total: 36.57 km^{2} (14.12 sq mi)
- Elevation: 42 m (138 ft)

Population (30 September 2014)
  - Total: 1,864
  - Density: 50.97/km^{2} (132.0/sq mi)
- Demonym: Villanovesi
- Time zone: UTC+1 (CET)
  - Summer (DST): UTC+2 (CEST)
- Postal code: 29010
- Dialing code: 0523
- Website: Official website

Villanova sull'Arda (Piacentino: Vilanöva, IPA: [ˌvilɐˈnøːvɐ] or [ˌvilɐˈnoːvɐ]) is a comune (municipality) in the Province of Piacenza in the Italian region Emilia-Romagna, located about 120 kilometres (75 mi) northwest of Bologna and about 25 kilometres (16 mi) east of Piacenza.

The commune borders on the municipalities of Besenzone, Busseto, Castelvetro Piacentino, Cortemaggiore, Monticelli d'Ongina, Polesine Zibello, San Pietro in Cerro, Stagno Lombardo.

== Main sights ==
- The Giarola River Park Island is located in the local part of the flood plain of the River Po. It is an example of environmental restoration after the intense mining of sand.

== People ==
Sant'Agata was the home for over 50 years of the opera composer Giuseppe Verdi who was born in the village of Le Roncole in 1813, who lived in the nearby town of Busseto, and who bought the land and built the Villa Verdi in 1848

== Culture ==
Festivals in the town include the "Cherry Festival", held in the second week of June, and the "Festival of the Frog and Catfish", which takes place on the last Sunday of May in the village of Soarza.

== Sport ==
Villanova is home to a basketball team (Villanova Basketball Pro), participating in the First Division of FIP.

== Transportation ==
Villanova sull'Arda has a railway station on the Cremona–Fidenza line. Direct connections are available from Cremona, while some trains run directly from Parma to both Busseto and Villanova sull'Arda without changing.
