= Castelvetro Piacentino =

Castelvetro Piacentino Castelvédar (Lombard)
- Comune
- Comune di Castelvetro Piacentino
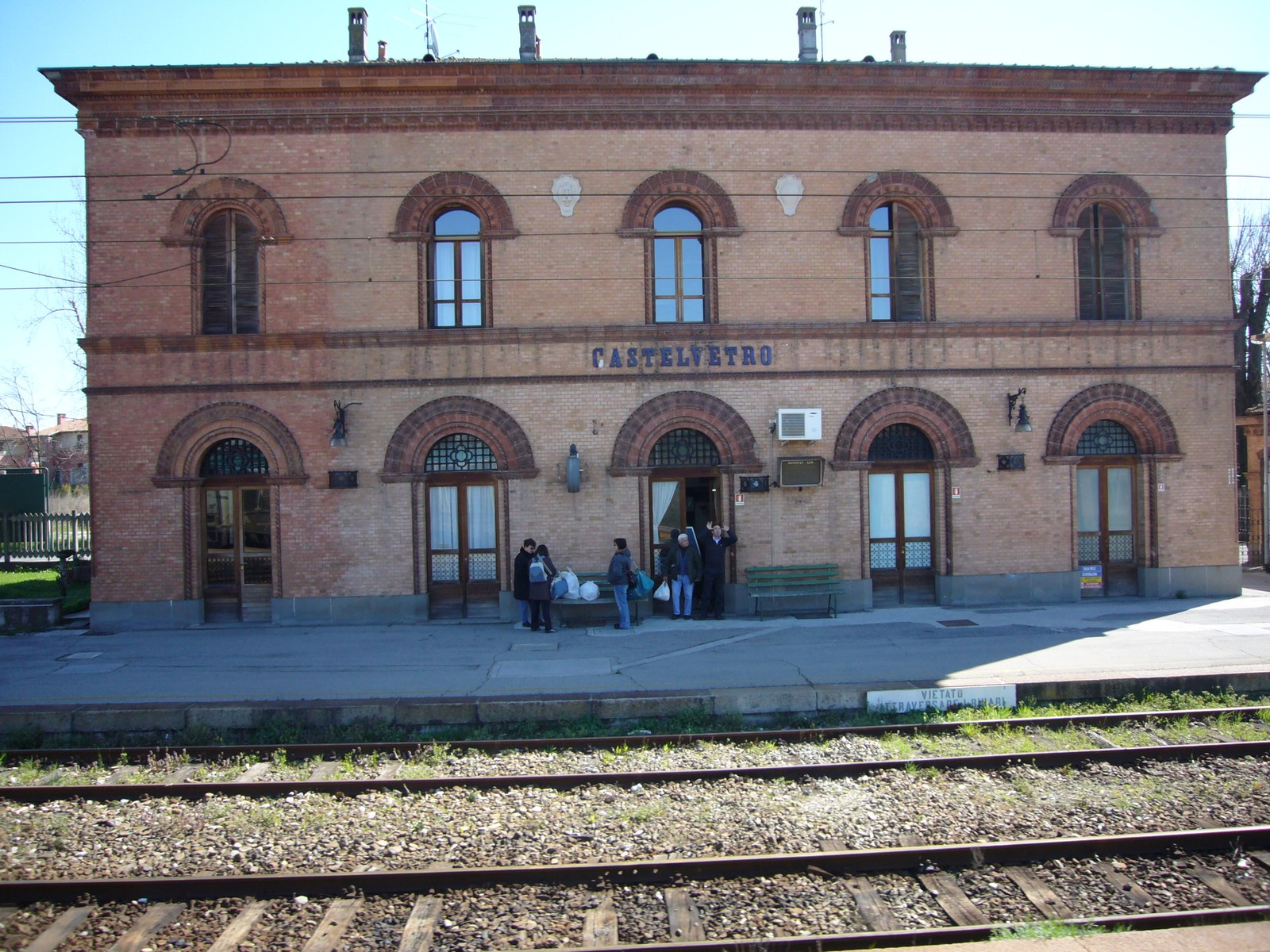
- Railway station

- Coat of arms

- Castelvetro within the Province of Piacenza

- Location within Italy Location within Emilia-Romagna
- Coordinates: 45°6′N 9°59′E
- Country: Italy
- Region: Emilia-Romagna
- Province: Piacenza (PC)
- Frazioni: Croce Santo Spirito, Mezzano Chitantolo, San Giuliano Piacentino, San Pietro in Corte (San Pedretto)

Government
  - Mayor: Silvia Granata

Area
  - Total: 35.1 km^{2} (13.6 sq mi)
- Elevation: 39 m (128 ft)

Population (30 June 2017)
  - Total: 5,374
  - Density: 153/km^{2} (397/sq mi)
- Time zone: UTC+1 (CET)
  - Summer (DST): UTC+2 (CEST)
- Postal code: 29010
- Dialing code: 0523
- Website: Official website

Castelvetro Piacentino, or simply Castelvetro (Piacentino and Cremonese: Castelvédar), is a town and comune (municipality) in the Province of Piacenza in the Italian region of Emilia-Romagna, located about 130 kilometres (81 mi) northwest of Bologna and about 25 kilometres (16 mi) east of Piacenza.

== Geography ==
The municipality is located in the northwestern edge of its province, and is separated from Cremona, and Lombardy, by the river Po. the other bordering municipalities are Gerre de' Caprioli, Monticelli d'Ongina, Spinadesco, Stagno Lombardo and Villanova sull'Arda.

It counts the hamlets (frazioni) of Croce Santo Spirito, Mezzano Chitantolo, San Giuliano Piacentino and San Pietro in Corte (also known as San Pedretto).

== Transport ==
Castelvetro has a railway station on the junction of the lines from Cremona to Fidenza and to Piacenza.

== People ==
- Mauro Cerioni (b. 1948), Olympic basketball player
