= Corte Brugnatella =

- Comune
- Comune di Corte Brugnatella
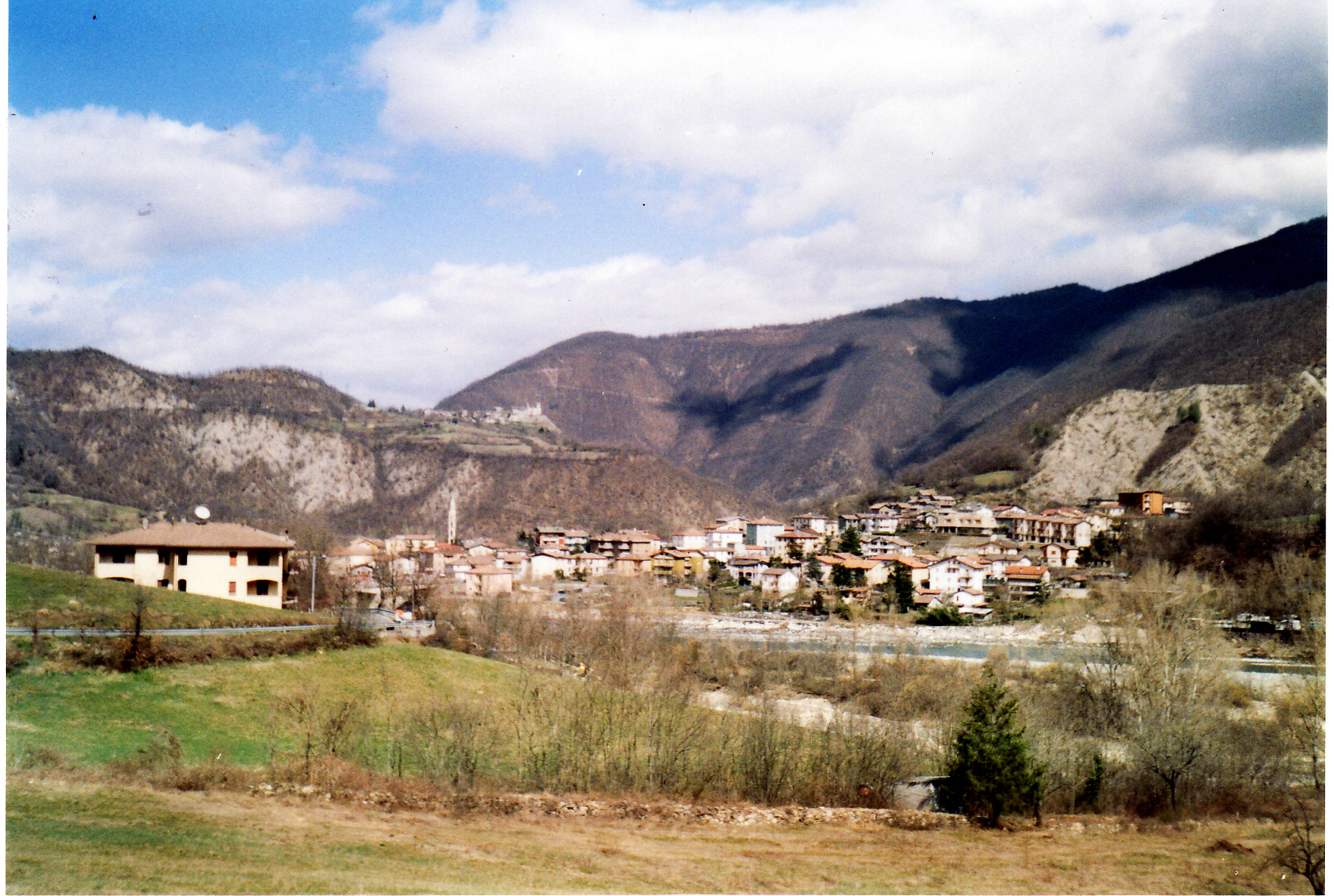

- Coat of arms

- Location within Italy Location within Emilia-Romagna
- Coordinates: 44°43′N 9°23′E
- Country: Italy
- Region: Emilia-Romagna
- Province: Piacenza (PC)
- Frazioni: Marsaglia, Brugnello

Government
  - Mayor: Renato Bertonazzi

Area
  - Total: 46.2 km^{2} (17.8 sq mi)

Population (31 December 2008)
  - Total: 712
  - Density: 15.4/km^{2} (39.9/sq mi)
- Time zone: UTC+1 (CET)
  - Summer (DST): UTC+2 (CEST)
- Postal code: 29020
- Dialing code: 0523
- Website: Official website

Corte Brugnatella (Bobbiese: Curt) is a comune (municipality) in the Province of Piacenza in the Italian region Emilia-Romagna, located about 160 kilometres (99 mi) west of Bologna and about 45 kilometres (28 mi) southwest of Piacenza.
