= Luretta Valley =

Valley in Piacenza, Italy

Coordinates: 44°58′N 9°32′E

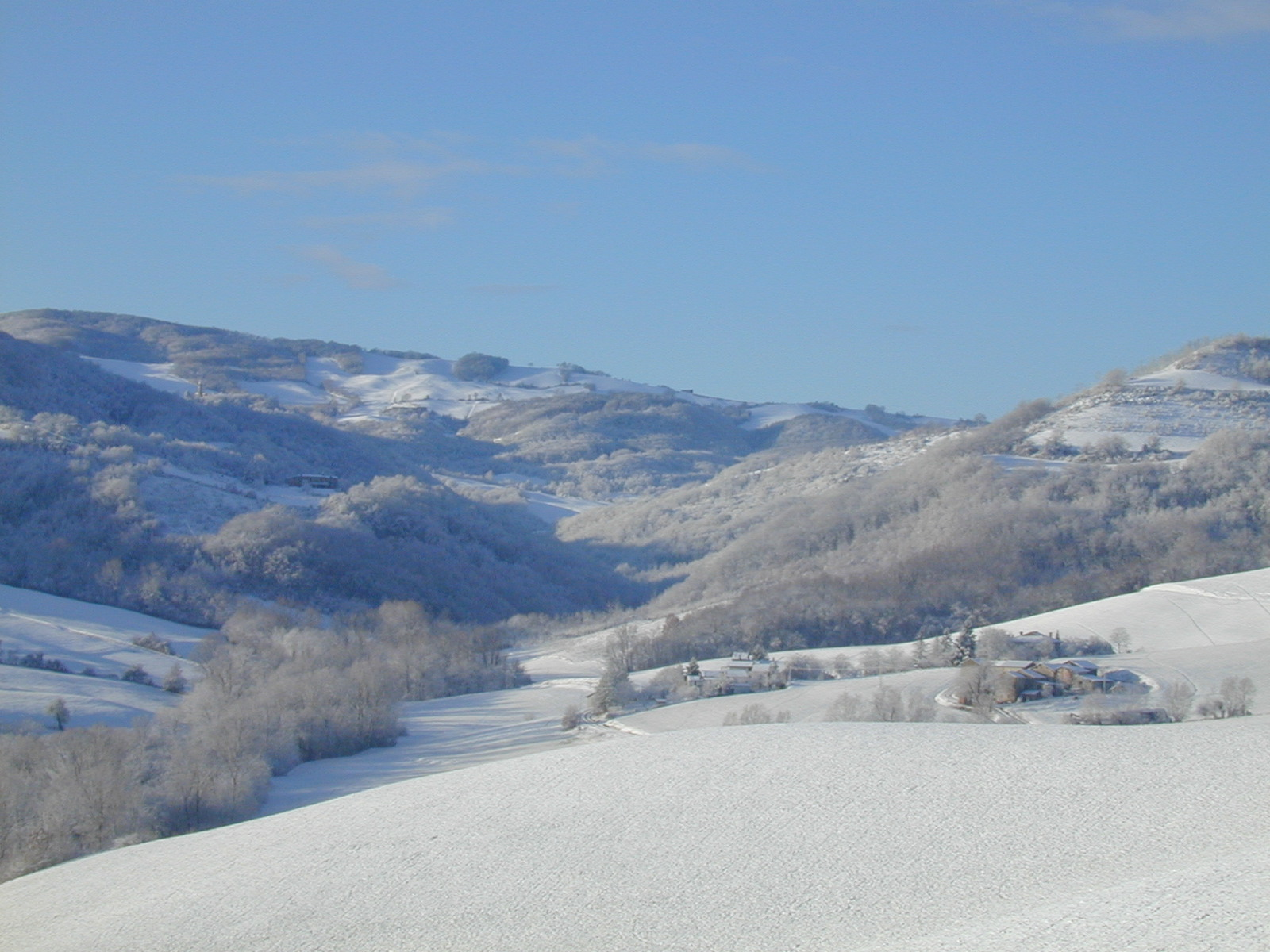
- The Luretta Valley in winter

Geography
- Location: Province of Piacenza, Emilia-Romagna, Italy
- Population centers: Agazzano, Gragnano Trebbiense, Gazzola, Piozzano, Travo
- River: Luretta
- Interactive map of Luretta Valley

The Luretta Valley (Italian: Val Luretta) is a valley in the Ligurian Apennines formed by the river of the same name and located entirely in the province of Piacenza.

== Physical geography ==
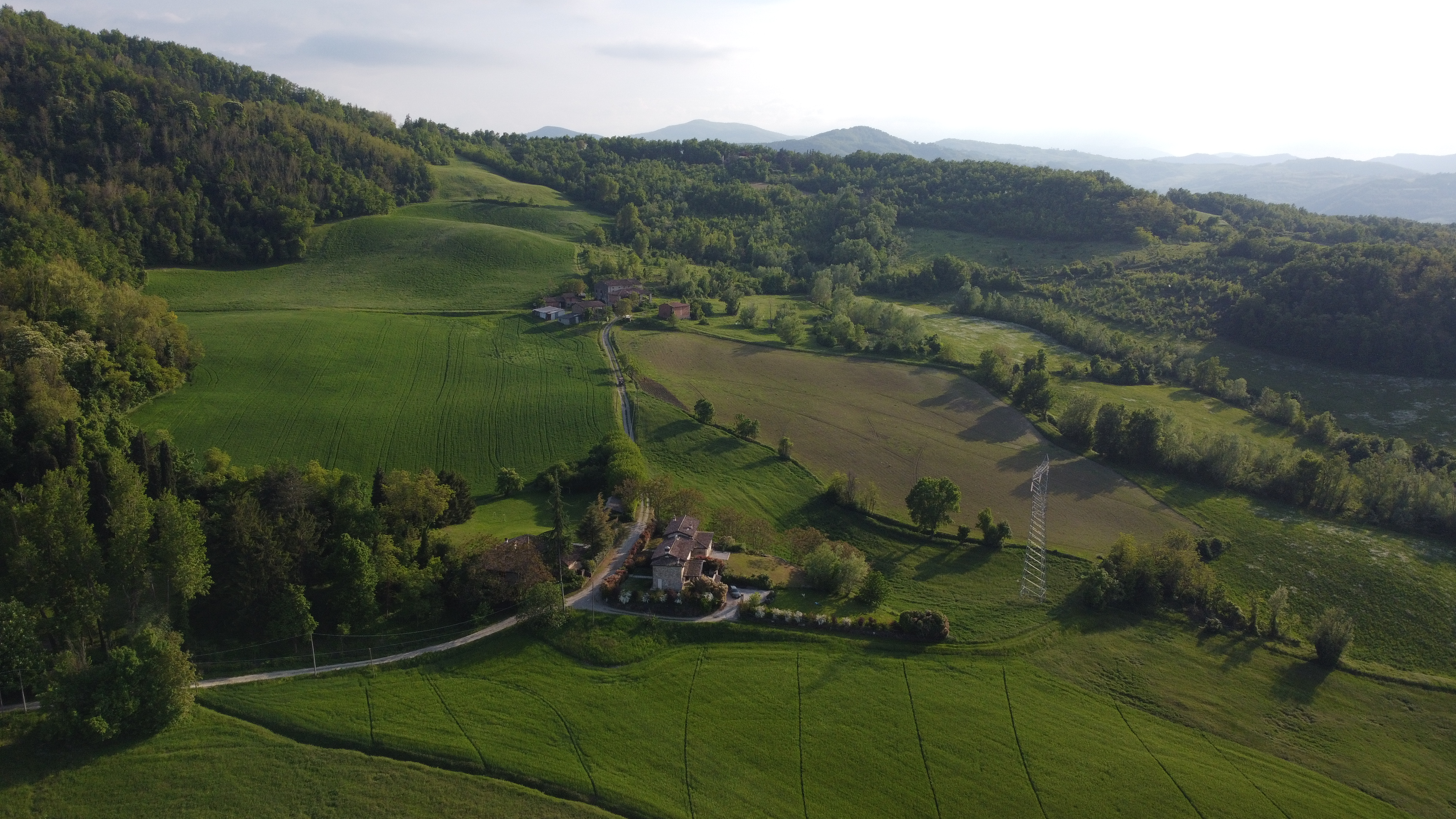
Aerial view of the Luretta Valley in the municipal territory of Gazzola

The Luretta Valley is formed by the Luretta River, which originates from the confluence of two branches, the Luretta of Monteventano, also known as the Upper Luretta, and the Luretta of San Gabriele, also known as the Lower Luretta; it extends as far as the Po Valley, where the Luretta flows into the Tidone, bordering the Tidone and Chiarone Valleys to the west and the Trebbia Valley to the east. At the head of the valley are the Caldarola Pass and Mount Serenda, from whose slopes the San Gabriele branch of the Luretta rises.

=== Passes ===
The Luretta Valley is connected to the Trebbia Valley by the Caldarola Pass.

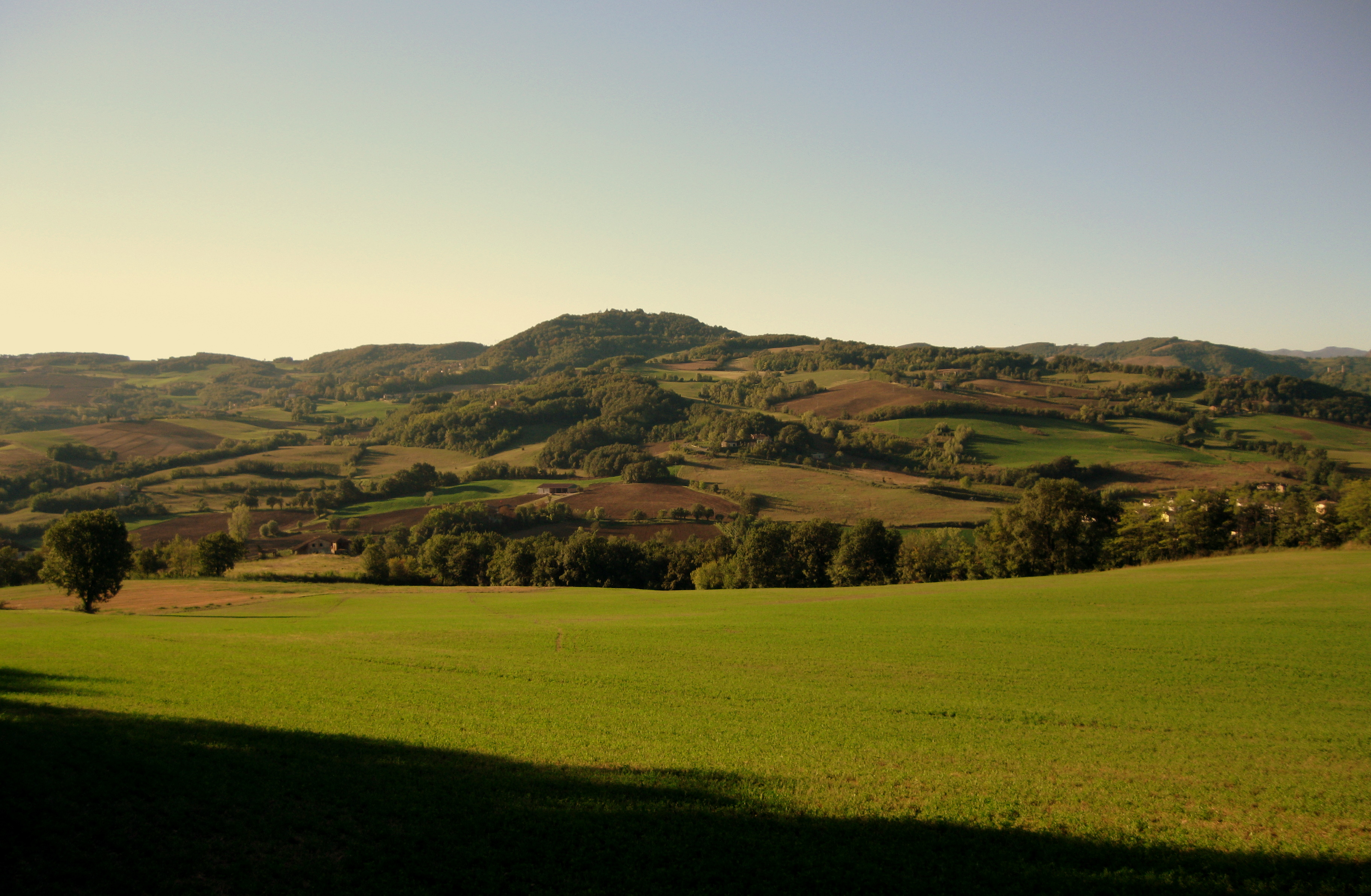
The middle valley with Mount Bissago

=== Mountains ===
Among the most important mountains in the valley are Mount Serenda (759 m a.s.l.), on whose slopes one of the two branches of the Luretta flows, and Mount Bissago, on whose slopes there are several castles, including that of Rezzanello.

=== Hydrography ===
The main watercourse in the valley is the Luretta river, 28 km long and with a catchment area of 101.6 km².

The secondary network of tributaries of the Luretta consists of the Rio Tarone and the Rio Magnana on the orographic left and the Rio Canto, the Rio Sarturano and the Rio Frate on the orographic right.

== History ==
The oldest finds, preserved in the Tidone Valley Archaeological Museum in Pianello, date back to the Bronze Age. Later, the valley was the site of settlements of people of Ligurian origin.

In Roman times the valley was inhabited with the foundation of several settlements: the Tabula alimentaria traianea mentions the Pagus Luras, a Latin hydronym for the Luretta river, the vicus of Pomarius (Pomaro) and Canianum (Montecanino), the fundus Acutianus (Agazzano) and Licinianus (Lisignano).

In 218 B.C., the valley's foothills were the scene of the Battle of the Trebia between the Roman legions led by Consul Tiberius Sempronius Longus and the Carthaginian troops led by Hannibal, who won the confrontation.

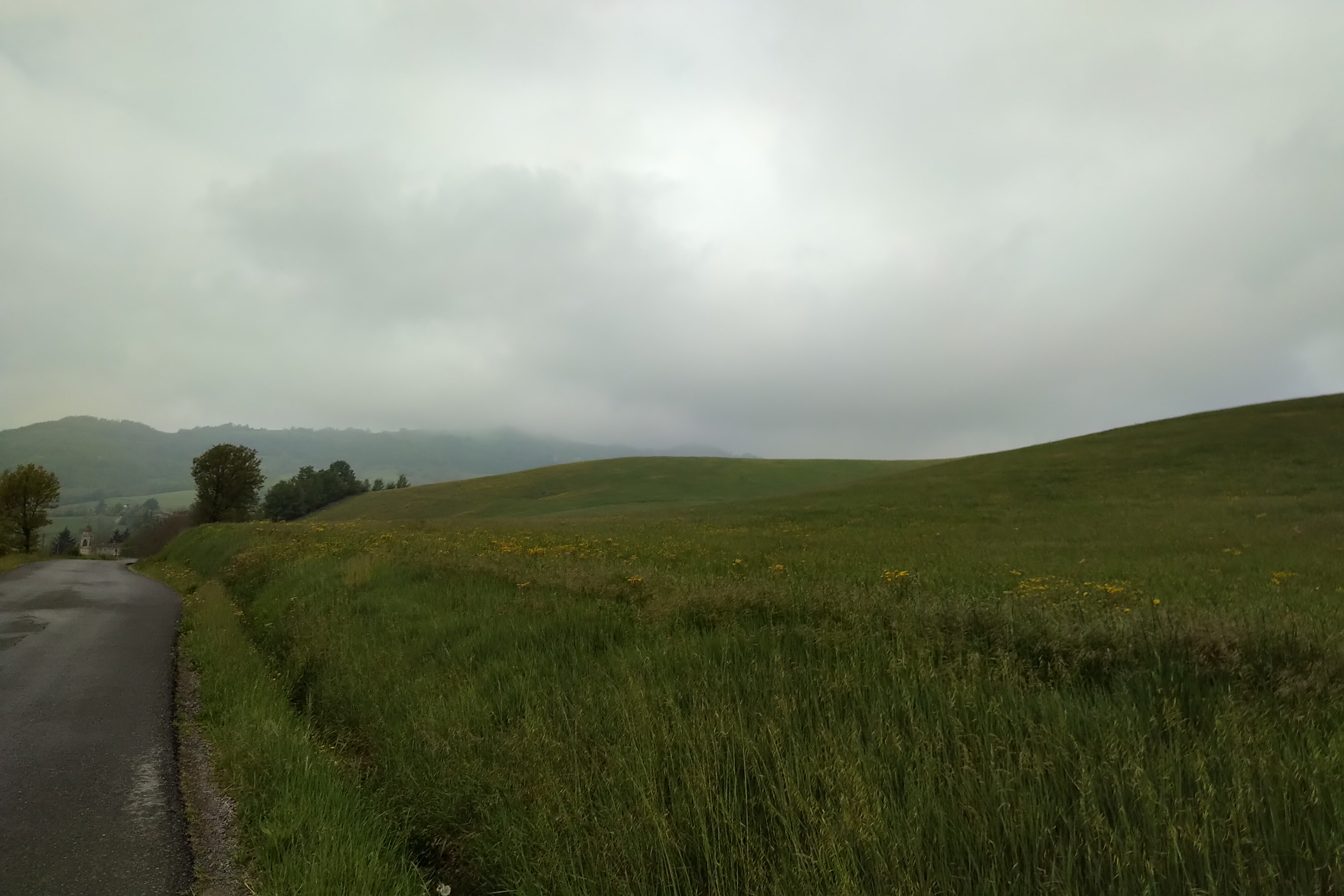
Panoramic view of the hills in springtime from the road leading from Piozzano to the Caldarola Pass.

In the late Middle Ages the area was affected by the struggles between the Guelphs and the Ghibellines, in particular between the troops of the Guelph Piacenza and those of the Ghibelline Pavia. In 1164, Frederick Barbarossa led an attack in the valley that resulted in the destruction of numerous fortresses, including Montecanino and Monteventano. The fighting between the two opposing factions continued until the thirteenth century: in 1212 a battle took place near the castle of Rezzanello between the Guelphs, who had taken refuge there, and the Ghibellines, who prevailed. In 1242 Obizzo Malaspina destroyed the castle of Pomaro, in 1255 Oberto Pallavicini destroyed the castle of Groppo Arcelli, and in 1268 Ghibelline troops again destroyed the fortress of Monteventano. In the same century, the Scotti family settled in Agazzano and made it the capital of their estates, as well as an important commercial center.

In 1372, part of the valley was occupied by troops in the service of the Pope, as part of the war between the latter and the Duke of Milan Galeazzo II Visconti.

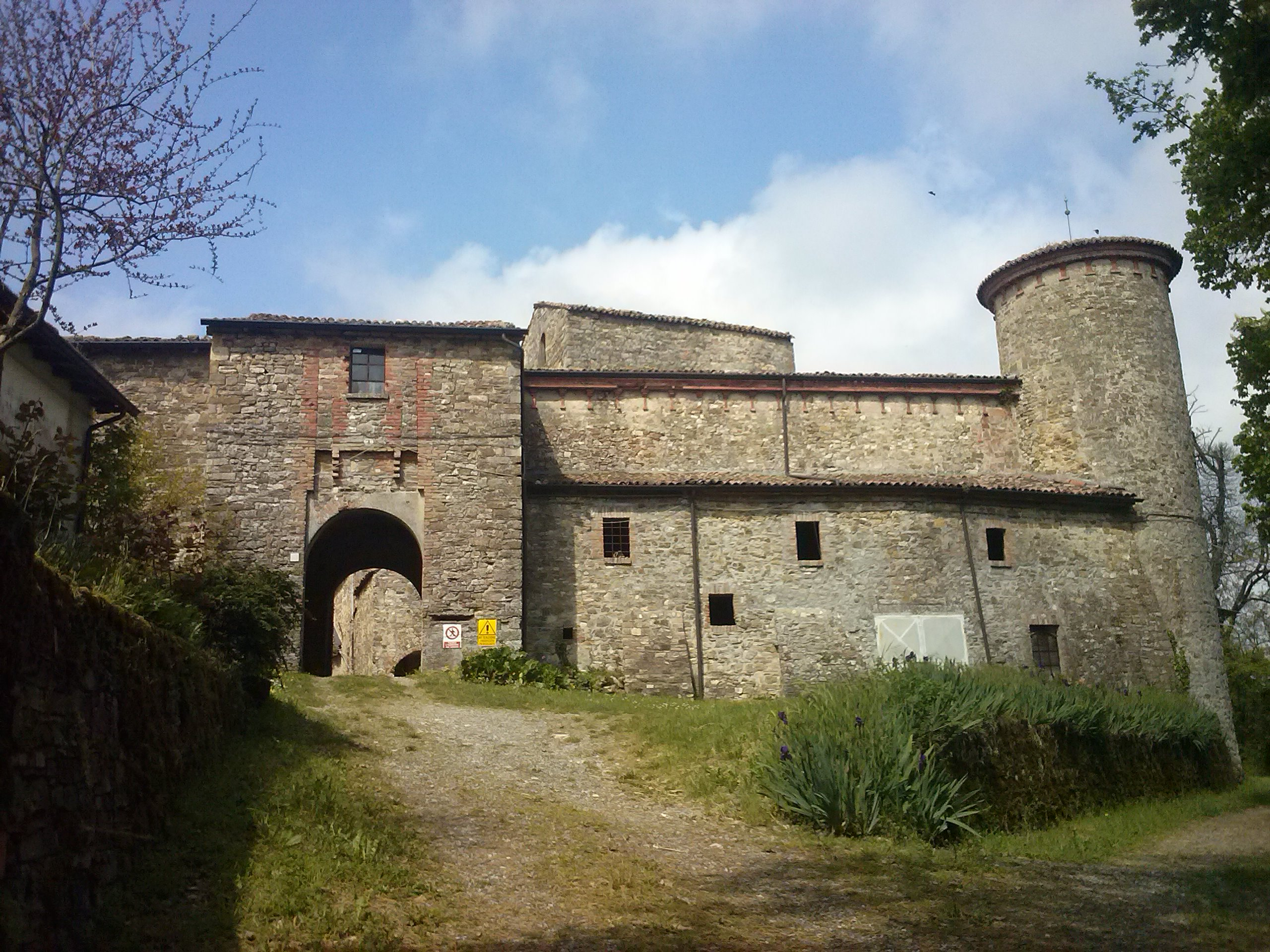
Monticello Castle, site of the battle in which Lino Vescovi died.

During the Second World War, in the context of the partisan war, the valley was home to a number of partisan brigades and the scene of important clashes between them and German and republican troops. Between the end of 1943 and the beginning of 1944, several bands were formed in the area, among which, in Sanese di Piozzano, stands out the Fausto band, commanded by the Carabinieri officer Fausto Cossu, which, after merging with other bands, formed the Giustizia e Libertà brigade, which then reached the rank of division with a total of about 4,000 men.

In April 1945, a bloody battle took place near Monticello Castle between a group of partisans barricaded inside the castle and 2 companies of the Black Brigades, the Leonessa and the Mantova. In the battle, the partisan commander Lino Vescovi, known as the Valiant, who led a handful of men in support of his comrades, was killed. Despite Vescovi's death, the partisans managed to defend their position, forcing the attacking troops to retreat.

== Landmarks and places of interest ==
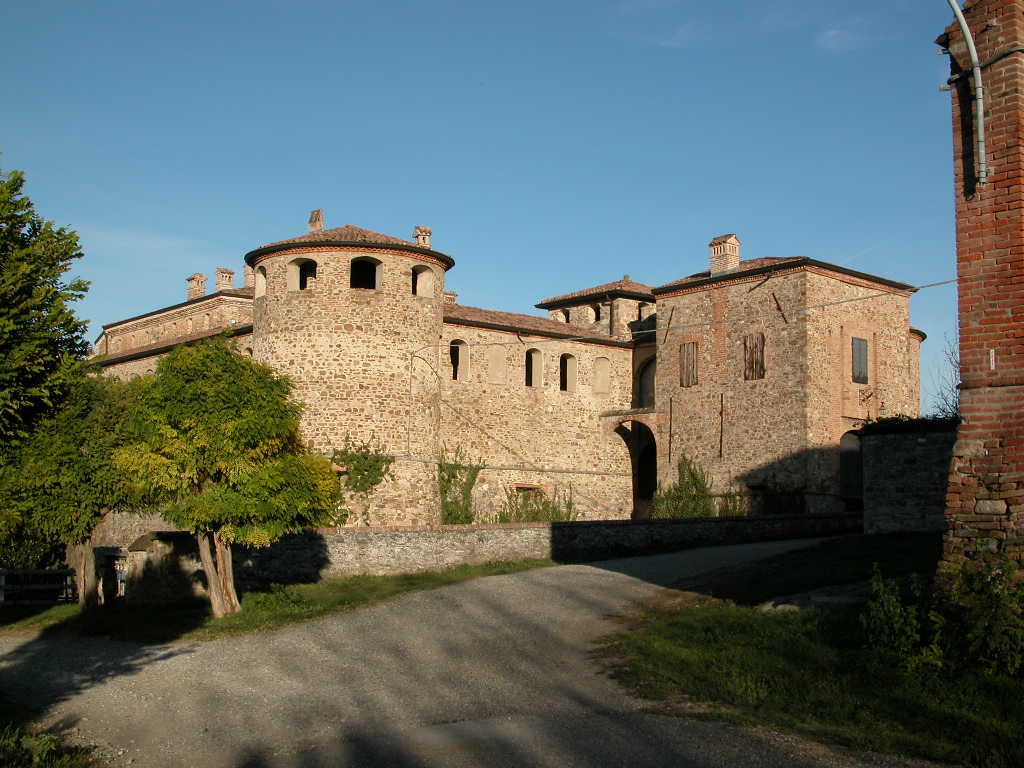
The castle of Agazzano

Castle of Agazzano
Built in 1224 by Alberto Scoto and modified in the 16th century, the fortress has a rectangular plan. The entrance consists of two bridges connected by a ravelin, which give access to the keep through an inner courtyard surrounded by an elegant loggia supported by columns whose capitals are coats of arms. The main façade is framed by two cylindrical towers, with the entrance tower in the middle (the carvings of the chains that raised the drawbridge are still visible), and has not been significantly altered over the years, preserving its original grandeur. Flanked by an 18th-century residential palace, it is privately owned and can be visited by appointment.
Bosonasco Castle
The medieval castle was later heavily altered from its original appearance and converted into a farmhouse. It is never mentioned in medieval records.
Castelbosco
Located near the village of Campremoldo Sopra, a hamlet of Gragnano Trebbiense, it is first mentioned in a document dated 1314; it was rebuilt in 1482 by Antonio Maria Scotti. According to some versions, the painter Giovanni Battista Tagliasacchi died inside in 1737. The building, which has a rectangular plan with two towers, a central one that has been greatly modified and one that has been lowered to the level of the walls, is used as a farm and houses the Shit Museum.
Castelvecchio
The oldest building in the Campremoldo area, of uncertain origin, was first mentioned at the end of the 12th century as belonging to the Pecorara family. In 1372 it was conquered by the papal troops who had invaded the Piacenza area, while in the 17th century it was destroyed during the war between Odoardo I Farnese and Spain. What remains of the original building is a structure with traces of a drawbridge and a courtyard made up of dilapidated buildings, some of which have been converted into dwellings: most, however, are reconstructions built on the basis of the original structures. According to a legend, a treasure is buried inside, which has never been found despite several excavations.
Gazzola Castle
Located in the center of the municipality of the same name, it has been used as the town hall, accessed from what was originally a courtyard. Heavily modified, the part of the building that retains its original medieval appearance is the one that overlooks the fields behind it.
Castle of L'Ardara
The complex, located on a promontory and surrounded by steep walls on three quarters of its sides, is in good condition thanks to a restoration, although its appearance has been greatly modified compared to the original. The original keep, partially incorporated into more recent constructions, has a Gothic arch in sandstone. On the outer walls there are the remains of two towers on the side facing the plain and two towers of lesser height on the upstream side; on the same side was the entrance with a partially preserved stone portal.
Lisignano Castle
Located on the banks of the river Luretta. A castle in this area was first mentioned in a document dated 1244, which mentions that the Marquis of Hohenburg, vicar of Emperor Frederick II, was accommodated there. The castle was commissioned by the Arcelli family and changed hands several times. It has a rectangular plan with cylindrical towers at the corners and is surrounded by a moat fed by the waters of the river. In the 18th century it underwent major works with the construction of a Baroque portico and a grand staircase.
Montecanino Castle
Built in the 11th century, it was destroyed by Barbarossa in the 1260s. It was later rebuilt and changed hands several times until it became the property of the Scotti family in 1528. In the following centuries it fell into ruins, and when it was bought by the Casati family in the 19th century, only a few ruins remained. Of the original imposing complex, with 6 towers, some structures and parts of the surrounding walls remain. The keep was demolished in 1963 because of the risk of collapse due to its state of neglect.

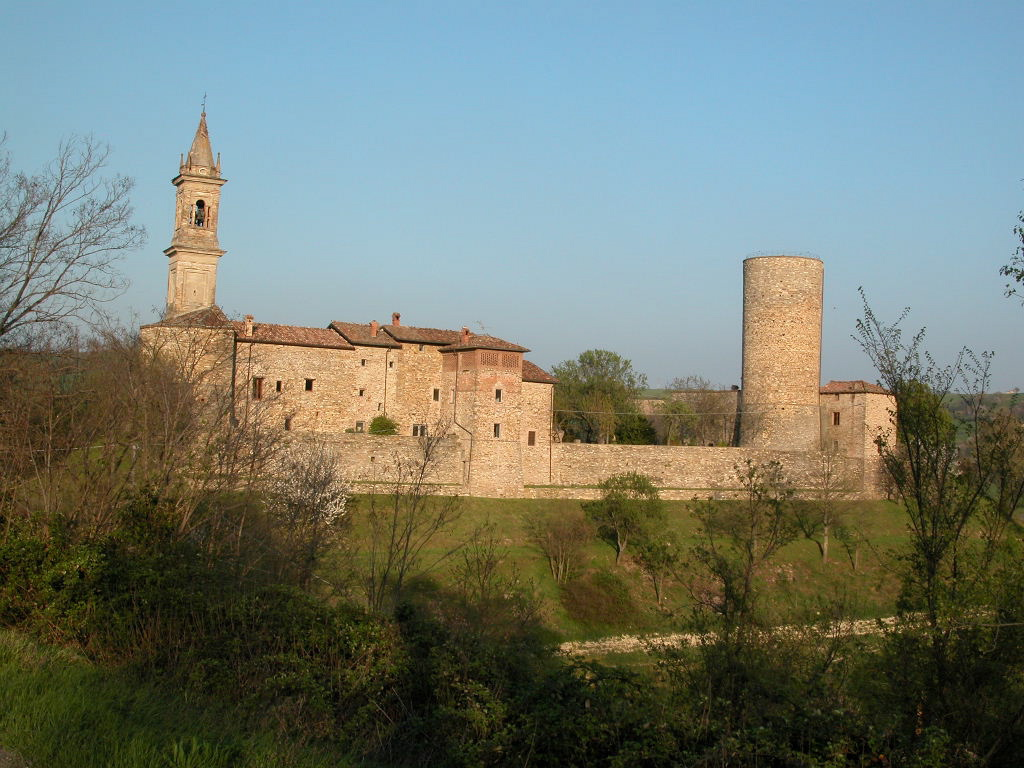
The castle of Monteventano

Monteventano Castle
It is located on the peak from which it takes its name, 420 meters above sea level and characterized by steep slopes on all sides. It was besieged and conquered by Frederick Barbarossa and later by the Ghibellines led by Ubertino Landi, who burnt it down. Later it was under the control of the Arcelli family from the 14th to the 17th century. During the Resistance, it housed the partisan brigades of Giustizia e Libertà. The whole complex is dominated by the keep, 30 meters high, placed along one of the sides. Near the bell tower of the Church of the Nativity of the Blessed Virgin Mary are the remains of a second tower, semicircular in shape.
Monticello Castle
Situated at 549 meters above sea level on the ridge between the Luretta and Trebbia valleys, it was first mentioned in 1372 when it was occupied by troops in the service of the Pope. In 1945 it was the scene of a battle between partisans and Germans, in which the partisan Lino Vescovi, known as the Valiant, was killed. The building has a square plan with round corner towers, except for one that has a square plan. The entrance, consisting of a low turret, bears signs of the original presence of a drawbridge.

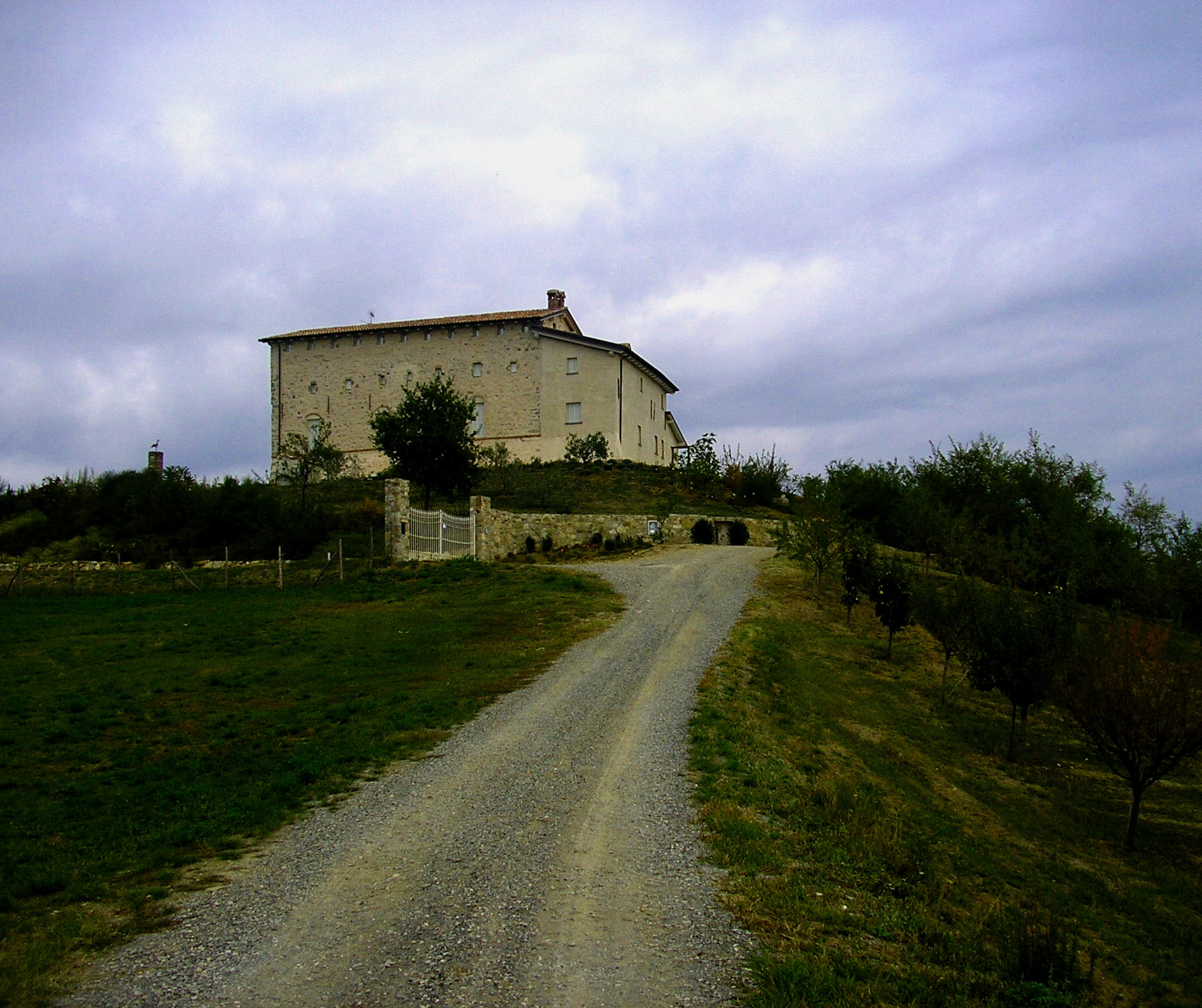
Pavarano Castle

Pavarano Castle
Located on the top of the homonymous mountain, it belonged to the Arcelli family in the 14th century and then to the Sforza family until the end of the 17th century. Initially surrounded by two orders of walls, it was completely abandoned between the end of the 19th and the beginning of the 20th century, also undergoing, over time, profound changes from the original structure. Of the original building, the perimeter walls are preserved; on the side facing upstream, there is a series of small trilithic windows.
Rezzanello Castle
Already in the 11th century it belonged to the Benedictine monks of San Savino, and in 1212 it was a refuge for the Guelph troops fleeing from the city during the battle with the Visconti, who besieged the castle and forced it to surrender at the end of the battle. In 1454 the monks gave the control of the castle to Dr. Bartolomeo Chiapponi. Afterwards, the ownership of the castle passed to the Hieronymite monks and from them to the English College in Rome, while the rights of the Chiapponi family passed to the Scotti family, who, in exchange for a large sum of money, settled the disputes that had arisen between the Roman College over the ownership of the building. In the twentieth century it was restored by the architect Guidotti in neo-Romanesque style. It has a trapezoidal plan with round towers at the corners.
Vei Castle
A castle with a rectangular plan, it was converted to rural use a few years after its construction and suffered a gradual decline. What remains of the complex is a taller structure in the center, the only remains of the tower, and the oldest part still standing. Completely abandoned, it is in a very poor state of preservation.
Tower of Montebolzone
Built at an unknown time, it was destroyed in 1243 by Pavese and Germans in the service of Emperor Frederick II. The tower has a square base and is built in stone in the lower part, about two thirds of the height, and in brick in the upper part, with traces of merlons and a decorative sawtooth motif. The keep of the old castle is about twenty meters high, which was later destroyed.
Rizzi Tower
The complex is characterized by a tower built between 1430 and 1440 on the initiative of the Da Veggiola family, to which a fortified building was later added. The tower is separate from the rest of the building. Inside there is a courtyard characterized by the presence of arcades decorated with terracotta tiles.

== Culture ==
The valley is part of the culturally homogeneous territory of the four provinces, characterized by common customs and traditions and a repertoire of very ancient music and dances. The main instrument of this area is the Apennine piffero.

== Economy ==
The economy of the valley is essentially agricultural, with cattle and horse breeding, riding stables, wine and cheese production. There are many trattorias and restaurants, even in the smallest hamlets, offering typical Piacenza cuisine and local wines.

== Infrastructure and transportation ==
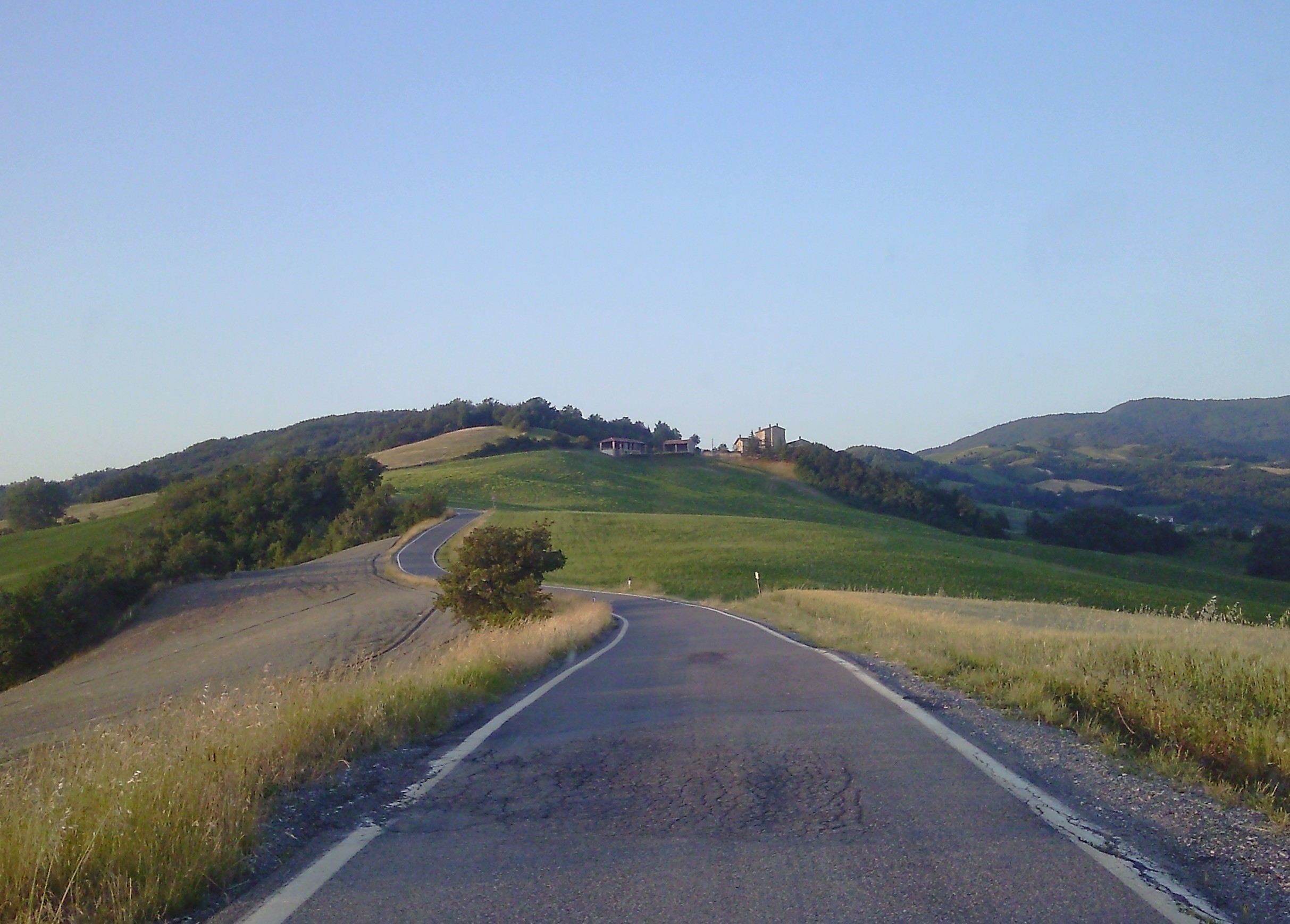
The provincial road 65 near Lardara

The valley can be reached from the Agazzano provincial road 7, which starts from the former state road 10 Padana Inferiore at San Nicolò a Trebbia, a hamlet of Rottofreno, and reaches Agazzano after passing through Gragnano Trebbiense and Gazzola. From Agazzano, the provincial road 33 of Cantone starts, which allows the connection with the Val Tidone, and the provincial road 7 bis of Piozzano, which, having reached the municipality of the same name, takes the name of the provincial road 65 of Caldarola, which reaches the pass of the same name, allowing the connection with the Val Trebbia. From the road to Caldarola, just above Vidiano, the provincial road 60 of Croce branches off to Pianello Val Tidone, in the valley of the same name.

Between 1907 and 1933, the central part of the valley up to Agazzano was served by the Piacenza-Agazzano tramway, which connected the provincial capital to Agazzano after passing through the municipalities of Gragnano Trebbiense and Gazzola.

== Administration ==
The Luretta Valley belongs administratively to the municipalities of Agazzano, Gazzola, Gragnano Trebbiense, Piozzano and Travo; Gragnano and Piozzano include territorial parts on both banks of the river, Agazzano on the orographic left and Gazzola and Travo on the opposite bank. Among the municipal capitals, Agazzano, Gazzola and Piozzano are located in the valley, Gragnano in the plain between the Luretta and the Trebbia, and Travo in the Trebbia valley.

The upper valley, belonging to the municipalities of Piozzano and Travo, was part of the Appennino Piacentino Mountain Community, later abolished and replaced by the Trebbia and Luretta Valleys Mountain Community.

== See also ==
- Piozzano

== Bibliography ==
- Albasi, Tiziana (2015). Tracce di romanizzazione nella val Tidone, Appennino Piacentino [Traces of Romanization in the Tidone valley, Piacenza Apennines] (PDF) (in Italian).
- Artocchini, Carmen (1967). Castelli Piacentini [Piacentine Castles] (in Italian). Piacenza: Edizioni TEP.
- Curtoni, Emilio (2002). Val Luretta [Luretta Valley] (in Italian). Edizioni Pontegobbo.
- Girovagando...Piacenza e le sue valli [Wandering... Piacenza and its valleys] (in Italian). Vol. I. Percorsi&Itinerari. 2005.
- "Il ducato di Parma, Piacenza e Guastalla" [The Duchy of Parma, Piacenza and Guastalla]. Itinerari (in Italian). 2000.
- Molossi, Lorenzo (1832). Vocabolario topografico dei ducati di Parma, Piacenza e Guastalla [Topographical Dictionary of the Duchies of Parma, Piacenza and Guastalla] (in Italian). Parma: Tipografia Ducale.
- Piano Strutturale Comunale - Relazione illustrativa del quadro conoscitivo - Sistema naturale e ambientale [Municipal Structural Plan - Illustrative report of the framework - Natural and environmental system] (PDF) (in Italian), Comune di Agazzano
- Relazione 12666 Piozzano Luretta [Report 12666 Piozzano Luretta] (PDF) (in Italian), Protezione Civile Regione Emilia-Romagna
