= Luretta =

Torrent in the Province of Piacenza, Italy

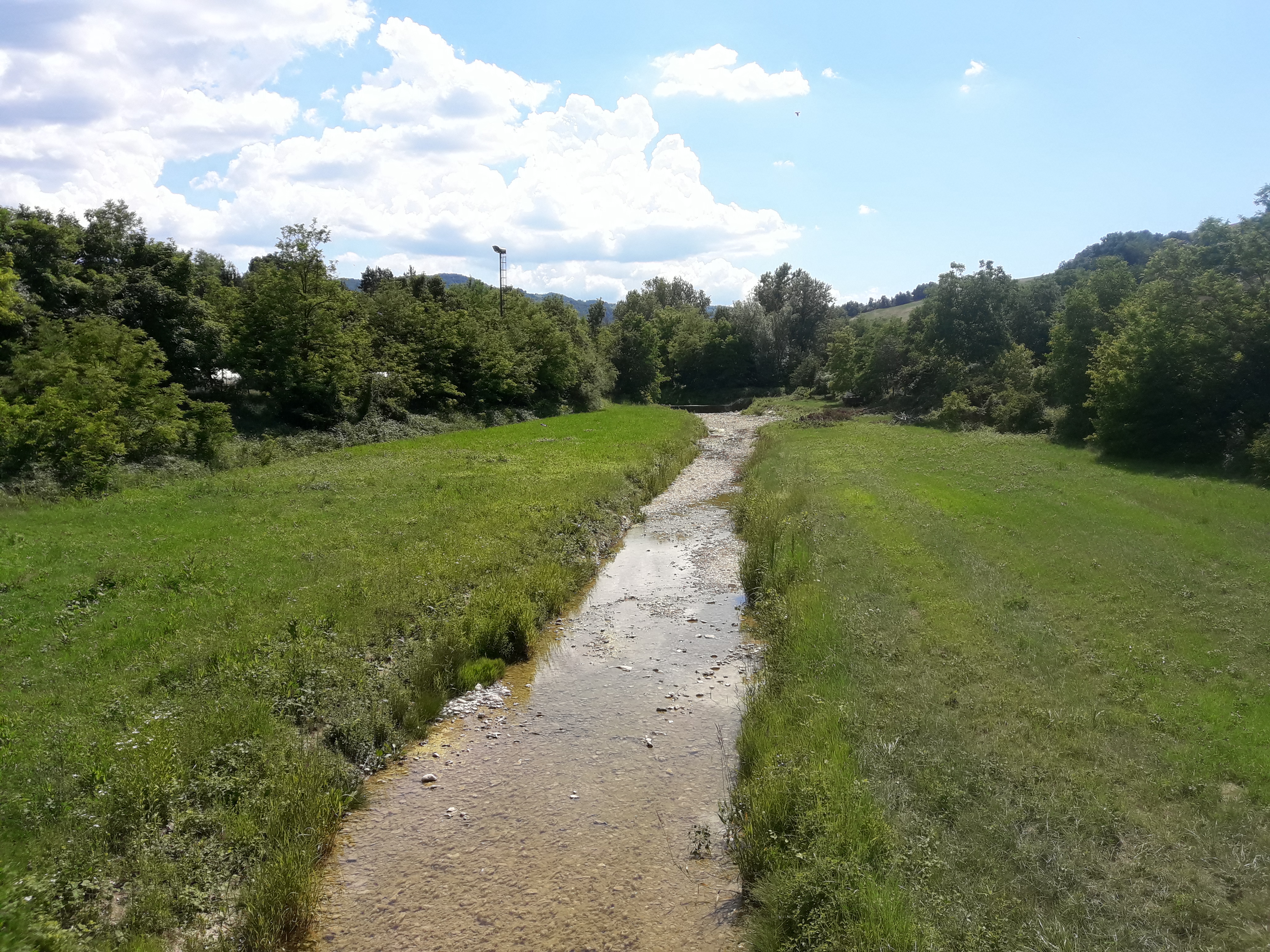
- The Luretta at Piozzano

Location
- Country: Italy
- Region: Emilia-Romagna

Physical characteristics
- Source: Luretta di Monteventano – Luretta Superiore
  - location: Le Mogliazze
  - elevation: 730
- 2nd source: Luretta di San Gabriele – Luretta Inferiore
  - location: Groppo Arcelli
- Mouth: Tidone
  - coordinates: 45.03986°N 9.53606°E
- Length: 28 km (17 mi)

The Luretta (la Nürëta [lɐˌnyˈrətɐ] or the Nür in Piacentino dialect) is a torrent approximately 28 kilometres (17 mi) long that flows entirely within the Province of Piacenza, a right-bank tributary of the Tidone.

== Course ==
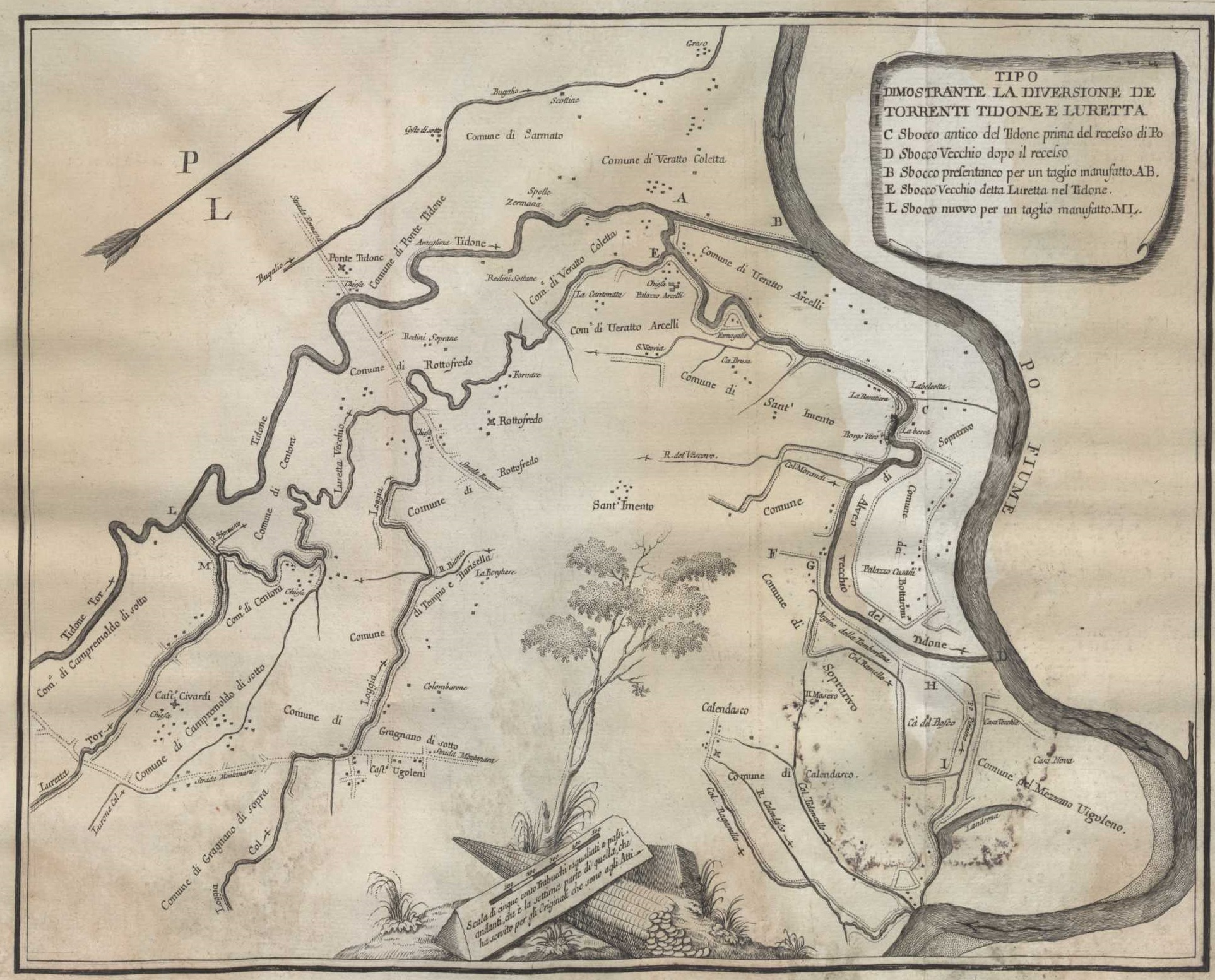
Map of the Tidone and Luretta torrents from the mid-18th century. From Intorno al nuovo taglio del Tidone e della Luretta by Giovanni Antonio Lecchi, 1750.

The Luretta originates in the municipal territory of Piozzano from the confluence of two branches: the Luretta di Monteventano, also known as Luretta Superiore, approximately 8 kilometres (5.0 mi) long, with its source in the locality of Le Mogliazze (or Il Moiaccio) on the slopes of Monte Lazzaro, near the border with the municipalities of Travo and Alta Val Tidone, and briefly marking the boundary between the municipalities of Piozzano and Travo, and the Luretta di San Gabriele, also known as Luretta Inferiore, approximately 4 kilometres (2.5 mi) long, with its source near the hamlet of Groppo Arcelli, on the slopes of Monte Serenda.

The two branches join near the locality of Guadà, forming the Luretta proper, also known as Luretta Grande. In the initial stretch of its course, the torrent has an average slope of 76 per mille, which then decreases to 31 per mille.

It then passes through the town center of Piozzano, skirts the towns of Agazzano and Gazzola, and enters the municipality of Gragnano Trebbiense in the Po Valley, where the average slope stabilizes at 8 per mille.

Entering the municipal territory of Rottofreno, it flows into the Tidone torrent between Centora, a hamlet of Rottofreno, and Agazzino, a hamlet of Sarmato.

== Tributaries ==
The Luretta has no particularly significant tributaries, receiving contributions from short torrents:

- Torrents on the left bank: Rio Tarone; Rio Magnana
- Torrents on the right bank: Rio Canto; Rio Sarturano; Rio Frate

== Hydrological regime ==
The torrent has a drainage basin of 101.6 square kilometres (39.2 sq mi).

The Luretta exhibits a distinctly torrential river regime, with low water levels in summer and regular floods in spring and autumn. The average flow rate near Agazzano, calculated over the period 1991-2001, is 0.35 m³/s, increasing to 0.44 m³/s at Campremoldo Sopra in Gragnano and to 0.64 m³/s at the mouth in the Tidone.

== History ==
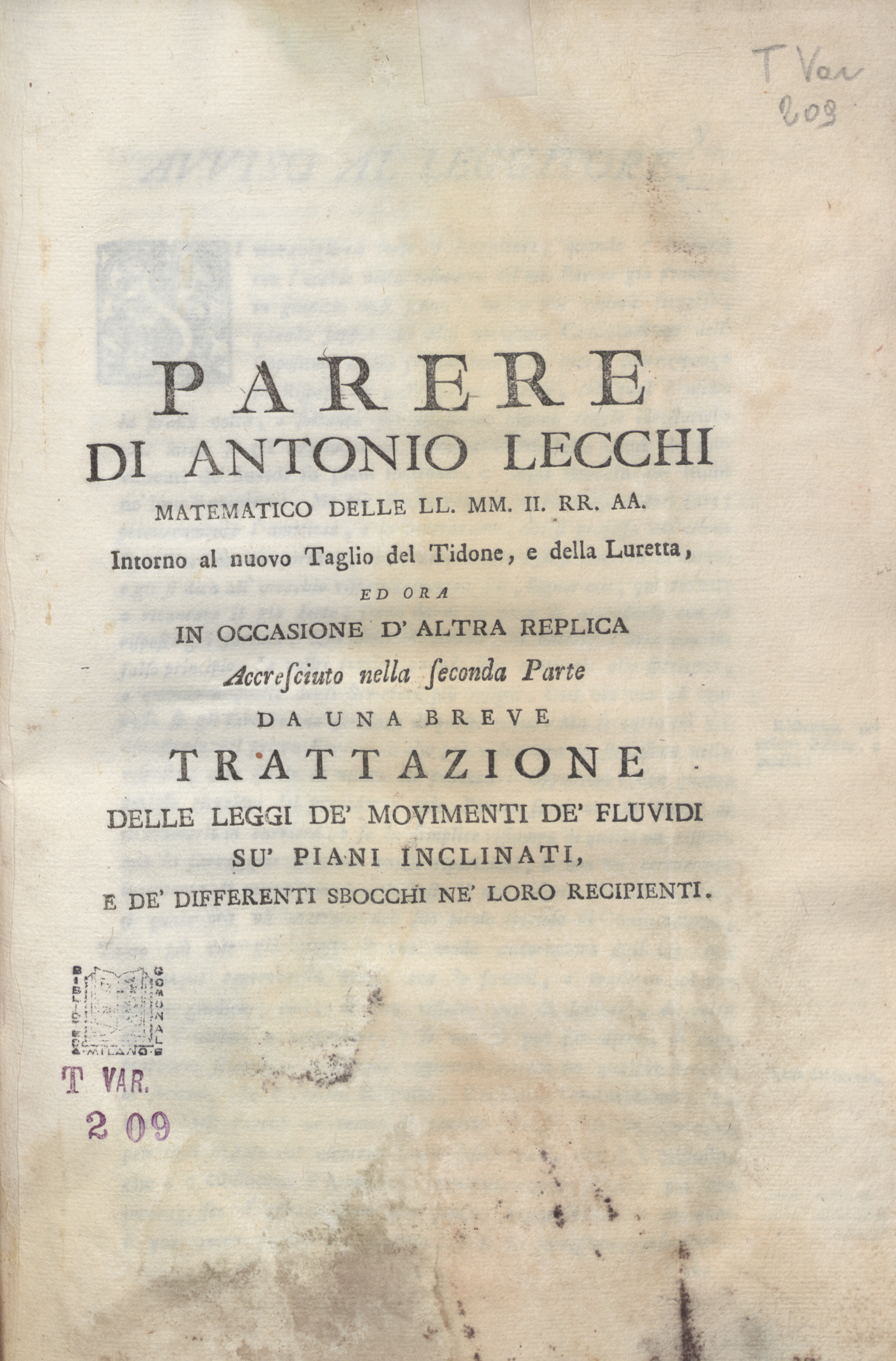
Giovanni Antonio Lecchi, Parere intorno al nuovo taglio del Tidone e della Luretta ed ora in occasione d'altra replica accresciuto, 1774

The lower part of its course was involved in the Battle of the Trebbia, where, according to the account of the Roman historian Polybius, in December 218 BC, Hannibal inflicted a heavy defeat on the Roman consul Tiberius Sempronius Longus. The Carthaginian army, encamped near Tavernago, managed to trap the Roman infantry in the marshy bed of the torrent; the Numidian cavalry, supported by archers, decimated the Roman soldiers, only a third of whom managed to escape to the opposite bank of the nearby Trebbia river.

In 1750, the mouth of the Luretta into the Tidone was subject to reorganization and reclamation works that diverted the course of the Rio Lurone and Rio Roggia, then tributaries of the Luretta, connecting them to each other and then directing them to flow into the Tidone.

== See also ==
- Luretta Valley
- Tidone

== Bibliography ==
- Daniele Cristofori; Gianpaolo Salmoiraghi (eds.). Individuazione del deflusso minimo vitale di riferimento [Identification of the Reference Minimum Vital Flow] (PDF) (in Italian).
- Curtoni, Emilio (2002). Val Luretta [Luretta Valley] (in Italian). Edizioni Pontegobbo.
- Girovagando...Piacenza e le sue valli [Wandering...Piacenza and its valleys] (in Italian). Vol. I. Percorsi&Itinerari. 2005.
- Il ducato di Parma, Piacenza e Guastalla [The Duchy of Parma, Piacenza, and Guastalla] (in Italian). Itinerari. 2000.
- Molossi, Lorenzo (1834). Vocabolario topografico dei ducati di Parma, Piacenza e Guastalla [Topographic Vocabulary of the Duchies of Parma, Piacenza, and Guastalla] (in Italian). Parma: Tipografia Ducale.
- Piano Strutturale Comunale - Quadro conoscitivo Sistema naturale e ambientale [Municipal Structural Plan - Knowledge Framework Natural and Environmental System] (PDF) (in Italian). Comune di Travo. 2011. Archived (PDF) from the original on 8 November 2020.
- Piano Strutturale Comunale - Quadro normativo [Municipal Structural Plan - Regulatory Framework] (PDF) (in Italian). Comune di Rottofreno. 2017. Archived from the original (PDF) on 27 December 2021.
- Piano Strutturale Comunale - Relazione illustrativa del quadro conoscitivo - Sistema naturale e ambientale [Municipal Structural Plan - Illustrative Report of the Knowledge Framework - Natural and Environmental System] (PDF) (in Italian). Comune di Agazzano.
- Relazione 12666 Piozzano Luretta [Report 12666 Piozzano Luretta] (PDF) (in Italian). Protezione Civile Regione Emilia-Romagna. Archived from the original (PDF) on 2024-07-03.
- Giovanni Antonio Lecchi (1750). Parere di Gianantonio Lecchi ... intorno al Taglio del Tidone e della Luretta [Opinion of Gianantonio Lecchi ... regarding the Cutting of the Tidone and the Luretta] (in Italian).
