= Agazzano Castle =

Castle and fortress in Emilia-Romagna, Italy

- Castello di Agazzano
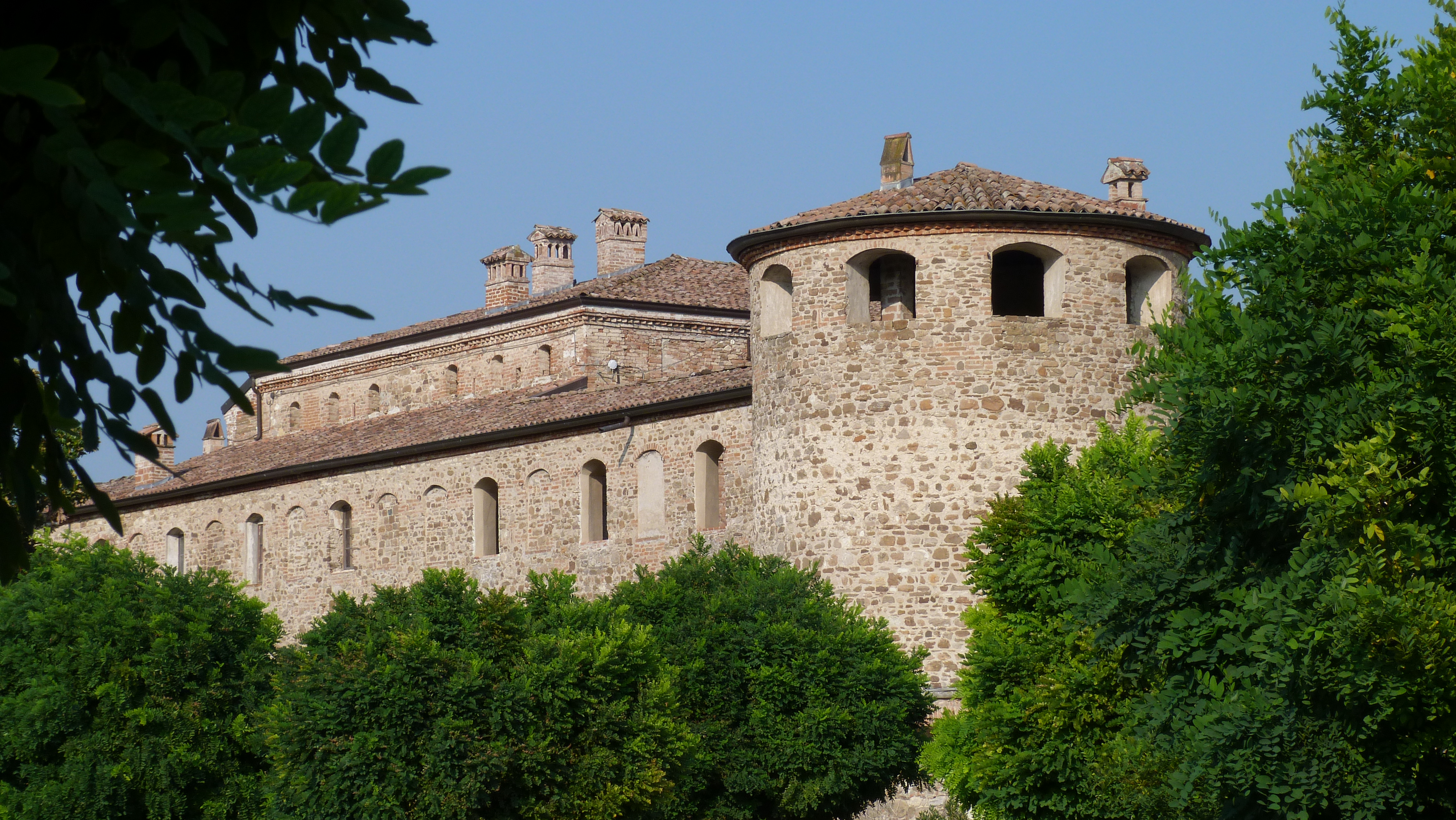

General information
- Type: Castle
- Location: Piacenza, Emilia-Romagna, Via del Castello, 3, Agazzano, Italy
- Coordinates: 44.946197°N 9.522211°E
- Construction started: 18th century
- Owner: Gonzaga di Vescovato family

Website
- www.castellodiagazzano.com

The Agazzano Castle (in Italian Castello di Agazzano) is a fortification located in Agazzano, in the province of Piacenza. The castle is located on the edge of Agazzano town, not far from the main square, which was intended to be defended by the castle, and it is located in the heart of the Luretta Valley, a short distance from the course of the Luretta creek, at a point of slight elevation difference, where the last hill extensions of the Ligurian Apennines give way to the Po Valley.

The complex, which is part of the Castles of the Duchy of Parma, Piacenza and Pontremoli Association, is composed of two buildings with completely different history, use and appearance: the Renaissance fortress and the 18th century palace.

== History ==
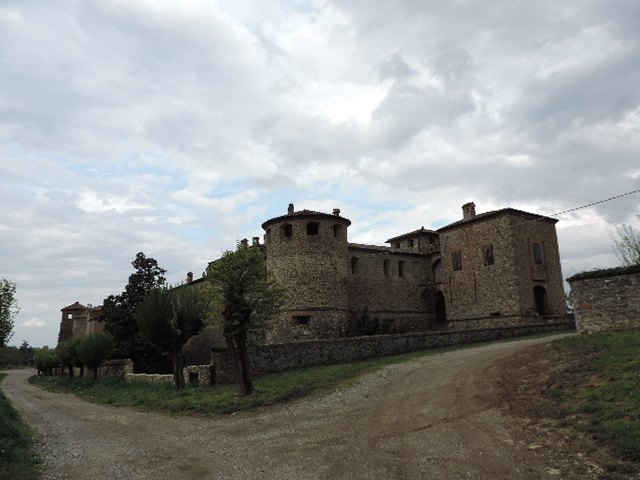
Agazzano Castle

The origins of the fortified complex date back to the 13th century at the behest of Giovanni Scotti, who made Agazzano the center of his family's holdings.

In the 14th century there was an increase in the power of the Scotti family, which had built its fortune on mercantile trades, through a company, the Societas Scotorum that reached the main marketplaces of Europe and the Near and Middle East from Genoa. The increase in family power allowed the parallel increase in the importance of the center of Agazzano, the small capital of the fiefdom, which never became an important center politically due to its decentralized location. At the beginning of the century Giovanni's son, Alberto Scotti, who was also able to become lord of Piacenza and, for a short time, Milan, had the construction work completed.

In September 1412, the castle, along with several other properties owned by the Scotti family including the castle of Sarmato and the fiefdom of Castel San Giovanni, was confiscated from brothers Alberto Pietro and Giovanni Scotti by the Duke of Milan Filippo Maria Visconti and assigned to Bartolomeo and Filippo Arcelli, who had accused the Scotti family of being part of an anti-Visconti rebellion, strongly opposed by the Arcelli family, who held several properties in the nearby val Tidone.

Three years later, the Scotti brothers succeeded in proving their innocence of the charges brought by the Arcelli family by regaining their fiefs. However, these did not include the castle of Agazzano, which had become part of the Figliagaddi family's property. It was repurchased by Count Alberto Scotti in July 1431.

The actual reconstruction of the complex dates back to 1475, when the Scotti family, after a fire had severely damaged the medieval castle, initiated the construction of a complex for defensive purposes consisting of two adjoining buildings: the castle and the fortress. The works brought the appearance of the complex towards a purely Renaissance style, attentive to the dictates of aesthetics, softening the typically military characters. In this period, the Scotti family joined the Gonzaga family through the marriage of the Count of Vigoleno Giovanni Maria Scotti with Luigia Gonzaga of Novellara, as evidenced by the presence within the complex of the symbols of both houses.

In 1529, the castle was conquered by Pier Maria Scotti, known as the Buso, who had to resort to the use of several pieces of artillery to conquer the fort, owned by Count Giuseppe Scotti. Following the conquest Pier Maria plundered the area, looting various materials. However, Scotti was killed shortly afterwards by Astorre Visconti, a Milanese outsider who had formed an alliance with him. He felt betrayed by Pier Maria during the division of what he looted. After the killing, the corpse was thrown by Visconti into the moat of the castle, but it was never found again.

The castle changed owner several times between the Scotti and Anguissola families until the Scotti family, which had been banished from the Duchy of Parma and Piacenza in 1606 managed to obtain a pardon regaining possession of the castle as a result of the mediation activities carried out by Queen Anne of France,. In 1652 Gaspare Scotti also managed to obtain the title of count of Agazzano.

During the 18th century, a villa was built on the ruins of the castle that flanked the fortress designed with exclusively residential functions. The complex remained among the Scotti's family possessions until 1741, after the death of the last heir Ranuccio. It passed to his eldest daughter Margherita, who brought it as a dowry to her husband, Count Girolamo Anguissola di Podenzano, who, as a result, decided to add the surname Scotti to his own surname.

The complex remained in the Anguissola-Scotti family until the 20th century when, after the marriage of the last heir Luisa Anguissola-Scotti to the general Ferrante Vincenzo Gonzaga, a member of the ramo di Vescovato of the Gonzaga family. The Scotti di Agazzano had been related to him since the 15th century, and the complex passed to their son Corrado.

== Structure ==
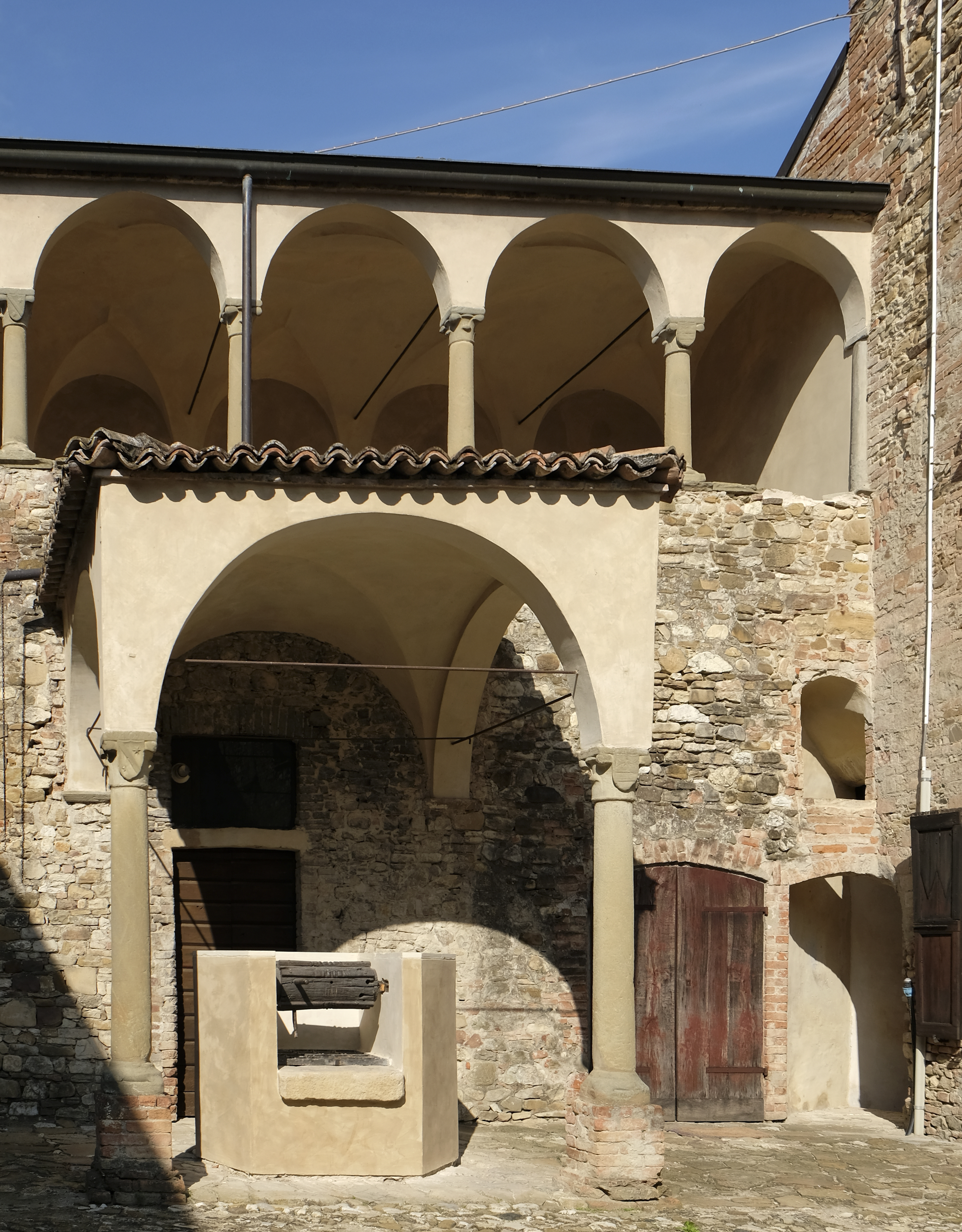
The well and loggia placed in the inner courtyard of the fortress

=== The fortress ===
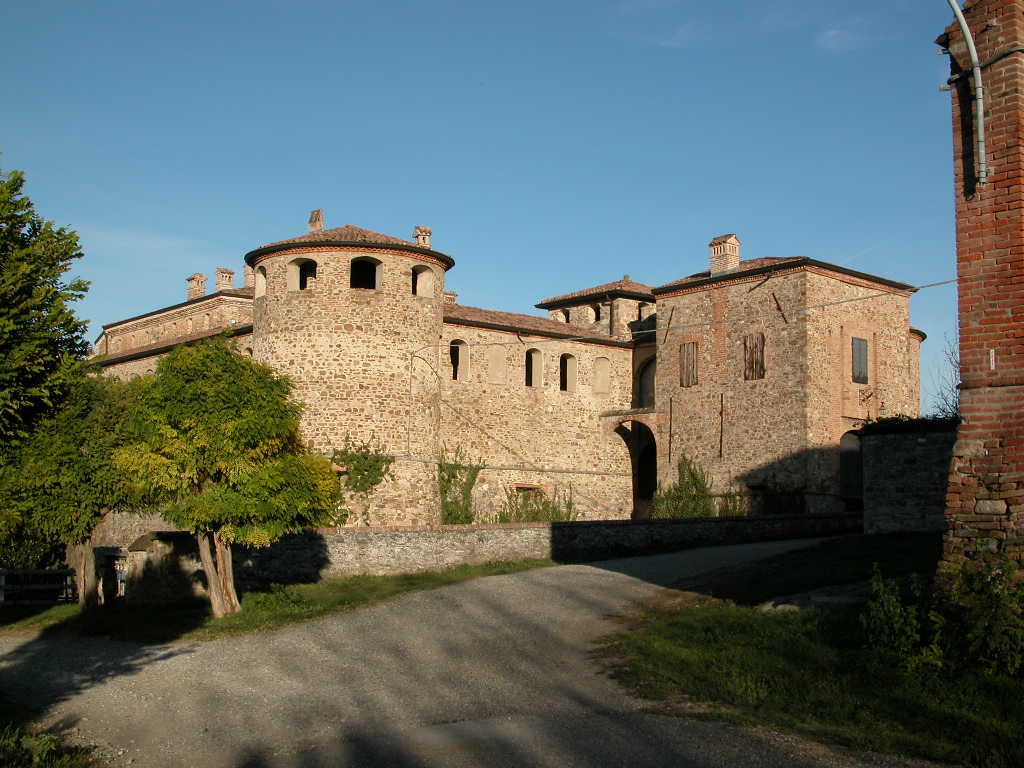
One of the towers and the entrance ravelin of the fortress

The appearance of the fortress dates back to 1475, when it was rebuilt after a fire had heavily damaged it. It presents a combination of elements belonging to a typically medieval defensive military architecture with elements with distinct Renaissance residential characteristics. Originally surrounded by a moat following eighteenth-century modifications, the fortress is surrounded by a garden. It has a rectangular structure bordered by scarped walls decorated with a transverse marcapiano. Of the four round corner towers originally present, only the two overlooking the entrance facade remain.

Access to the fortress is allowed through a ravelin that was equipped with a drawbridge (its stonework remains visible), which was later replaced by a masonry entrance. A second ravelin was placed on the opposite facade in the direction of the body called the castle, later replaced during the 18th century by the villa. The inner courtyard, equipped with a well of hexagonal shape placed in a edicola, has on three sides out of four a loggia with a cross vault accessed from the entrance via two flights of stairs. The fourth side, built towards the end of the Renaissance, housed the living quarters of the castle's military garrison and has lounges with fireplaces and kitchens in excellent condition. A staircase located in the courtyard leads to a passageway that, legend has it, would allow one to reach the castle of Lisignano, located on the other bank of the Luretta River in the territory of the municipality of Gazzola.

=== The-eighteenth-century villa ===
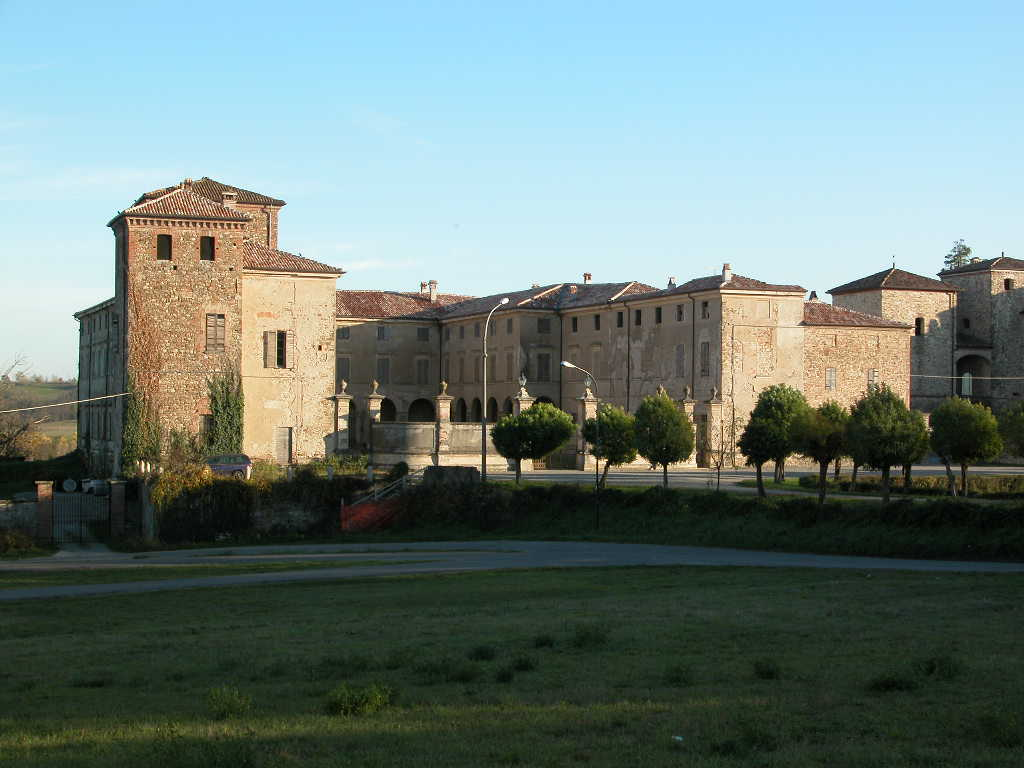
The villa

Access to the villa is made through a French style gate, typical of the 18th century, which allows access to a U-shaped courtyard equipped with porch on three out of four sides, while the facade has a neoclassical architecture style. The interior features a series of landscape-decorated halls on the ground floor equipped with furniture dating back to the 18th and 19th centuries.

Inside the dining room is a collection of ceramics of different production, including antique Savona, Vecchia Lodi and Japanese, as well as some Maissen and Sèvres porcelain. In the same room, there is also a billiard table equipped with a scoreboard dating back to the seventeenth century.

=== The garden ===
The two parts of the complex are surrounded by a garden designed by the botanist Luigi Villoresi in the 18th century, like the villa. It stands where there was originally a vineyard and moat surrounding the outside of the fortress. In the garden there is a park-like part formed by various ancient tree species, and another garden part, equipped with statues and a fountain in which the influence of French architecture of the time is clear. Of the vineyard initially present, a portion remains about 3 hectares wide, which is used for the production of wines that are later on aged inside the cellars of the old castle located below the villa.

== Current use ==
The structures and gardens are available for cultural and private events.

== See also ==
- House of Gonzaga
- Province of Piacenza

== Bibliography ==
- Carmen Artochini, Castelli Piacentini, Piacenza, Edizioni TEP, 1958 [1967]
- Pier Andrea Corna, Castelli e rocche del Piacentino, Piacenza, Unione Tipografica Piacentina, 1993.
- Daniella Guerrieri, Castelli del Ducato di Parma e Piacenza, Piacenza, NFL, 2006.

== Other Projects ==
- Wikimedia Commons contains images or other files on Agazzano Castle
