= Castello di Lisignano =

Medieval-Renaissance castle in Gazzola, Emilia-Romagna, Italy

- Gazzola, Emilia-Romagna in Italy
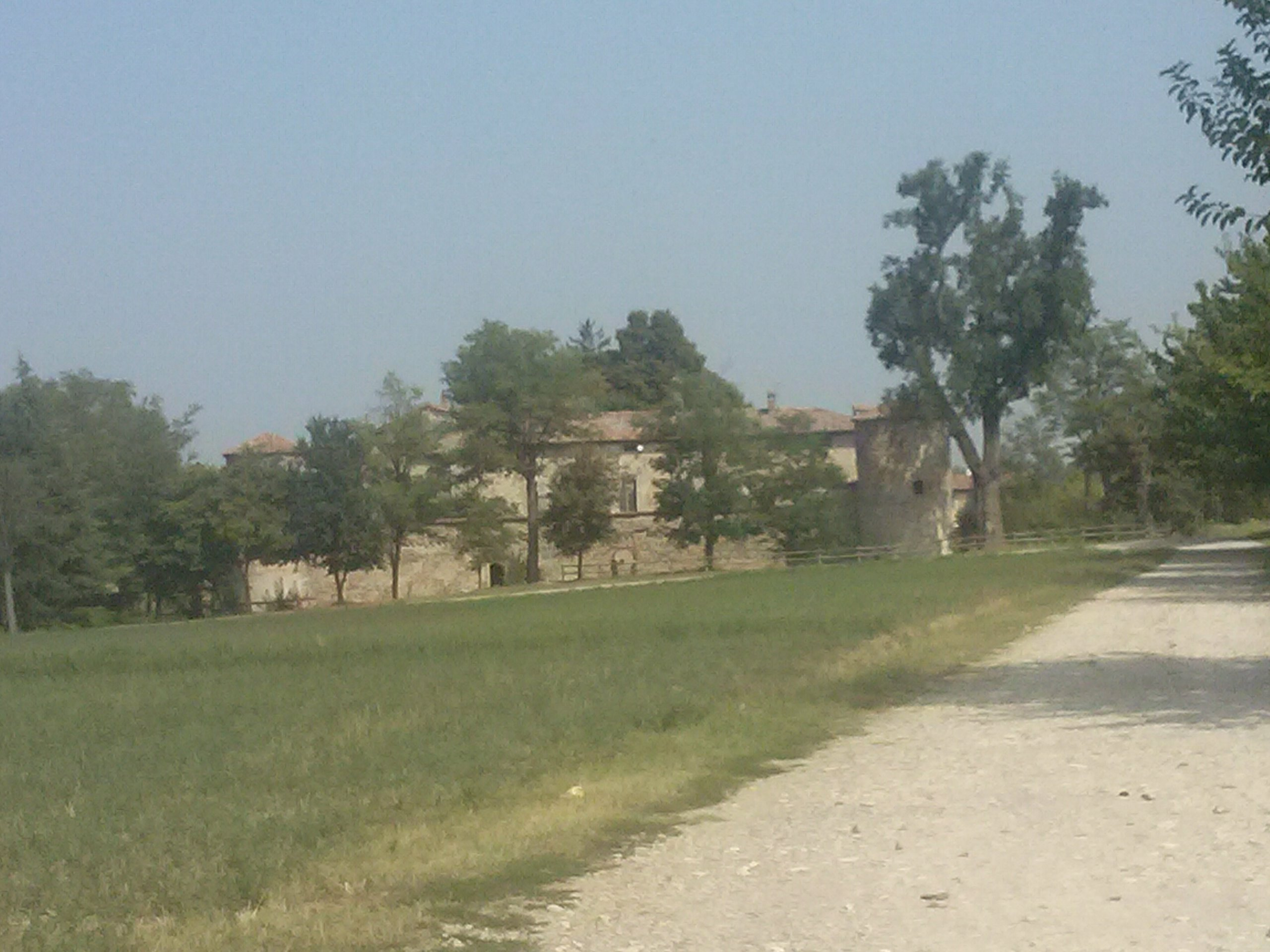

Site information
- Type: Castle
- Owner: Del Boca family
- Open to the public: no
- Condition: Good
- Website: "Poderi Lisignano". Archived from the original on 26 July 2020.

Location
- Coordinates: 44.9496°N 9.5355°E

Site history
- Built: 12th century
- Materials: Stone
- Artocchini. Castelli piacentini. pp. 148–152.

The Castello di Lisignano is a fortress located in Lisignano, a hamlet of the Italian comune of Gazzola, in the Province of Piacenza.

The castle is situated on the initial slopes of the Ligurian Apennines, on the right bank of the Luretta stream, near the point where the Luretta Valley opens into the plain, a short distance from Agazzano, the main town of the neighboring commune, where another castle is located on the opposite bank of the Luretta.

== History ==
Lisignano is likely the Licinianus mentioned in the Tabula Alimentaria Traiana, which was a plot dedicated to agricultural activities. Later, Lisignano is mentioned in a deed of transfer from 800, in which the judge Albizzone donated 800 pertica to the monastery of San Savino in Piacenza, including some buildings and fields suitable for vine cultivation.

The first mention of a castle in Lisignano, though likely built earlier in the 12th century, dates to 1203, while in 1244, the stay of the Marquess of Hohenburg is documented. As a vicar in the service of Emperor Frederick II, he conducted several raids in the area between the Luretta Valley and the Tidone Valley for intimidation purposes.

Subsequently, a new castle was built in the area by the Arcelli family. In the mid-14th century, the building was owned by Giovanni Pagani, who, after his death, passed it to the children of his sister Pellegrina, who had married a member of the Anguissola family. Upon her death, the building, which was in poor condition due to a fire, was sold by her husband, who managed it as a guardian, to Giovanni, Giacomo, and Guglielmo Figliagaddi. In the 14th century, the building became part of the assets of the condottieri Nicolò Piccinino and Jacopo Piccinino, before returning to the Arcelli family.

After becoming the property of the Great Hospital of Piacenza in 1630 following the death of the last owner, Maurizio Baldini, the building was purchased in 1632 by Giuseppe Rizzalotti, succeeded first by his wife Ortensia Leoni, then by their nephews Melchiorre and Francesco Leoni, who were of Catalan origin and were invested as counts in 1680, after completing the purchase of the Lisignano territory from the Farnese Ducal Chamber.

In the late 17th century, the castle's interiors underwent several modifications to adapt it as a noble residence: the changes, designed by Ferdinando Galli da Bibbiena, included work on the exterior, with the eastern side decorated with various architectural elements and frescoes overlooking an arched courtyard, while to the south of the building, a small grove was created with a sculpture at its center depicting Hercules slaying the Nemean Lion.

The transformations continued in the 18th century when a double portico with four arches in the Baroque style was built, along with a grand staircase providing access to the noble floor of the building.

In the early 19th century, the building was transferred from the Leoni counts to the Mestri family.

During World War II, as part of the partisan resistance, the castle hosted the future historian and writer Angelo Del Boca, a member of a Brigata Giustizia e Libertà, who took refuge inside to escape Nazi-Fascist troops. Later, Del Boca, by marrying Maria Teresa Maestri, became the owner of the building.

== Structure ==
The castle is an isolated fortification surrounded by a moat fed by the waters of the Luretta stream and crossed by a drawbridge with wooden beams and chains, originally resting on a counterbridge. The fort's plan is rectangular with four round towers at the corners. On the northeastern side, there is a Baroque portico added during the 18th-century renovations, while the other three sides feature remnants of frescoes depicting a loggia. Although the four facades are of similar length, they have different elevations: the northwestern and northeastern facades match the height of the corner towers, the southeastern facade is lower, and the southwestern facade has two levels.

On the southern side, opposite the entrance, within a grove, there is a nymphaeum featuring the statue of Hercules defeating the Nemean Lion, added in the late 17th century. The interiors feature large rooms with extensive use of natural lighting, while the ceilings are vaulted with lunettes. Beneath the main tower is a cramped room, originally used as a prison, accessible only through a trapdoor in the ceiling, through which prisoners were lowered from above. According to tradition, a narrow tunnel starts from the prison, passing under the Luretta stream, connecting the castle to the Agazzano manor.

== Bibliography ==
- Artocchini, Carmen (1983) [1967]. Castelli piacentini [Piacenza Castles] (in Italian). Piacenza: Edizioni TEP.
- Cortesi, Paolo (2007). I castelli dell'Emilia Romagna [The Castles of Emilia-Romagna] (in Italian). Rome: Newton Compton Editori.
