= Giuseppe Beotti =

Martyred Italian priest

Blessed Giuseppe Beotti

Martyr
- Born: 26 August 1912; Gragnano Trebbiense, Province of Piacenza, Kingdom of Italy
- Died: 20 July 1944 (aged 31); Sidolo, Bardi, Province of Parma
- Venerated in: Roman Catholic Church
- Beatified: 30 September 2023, Cathedral of Santa Maria Assunta e Santa Giustina, Piacenza, Italy by Cardinal Marcello Semeraro
- Feast: July 20
- Attributes: Priestly vestments and martyr's palm

Giuseppe Beotti (26 August 1912 – 20 July 1944), was an Italian Catholic priest murdered by Nazi soldiers for his charitable works. Don Beotti, as he is known to Italian Catholics, was confirmed as a martyr by the Roman Catholic Church on May 20, 2023. He was beatified in Piacenza Cathedral on September 30, 2023.

== Early life ==
Born on August 26, 1912, in Campremoldo Sotto, a village close to the city of Gragnano Trebbiense, Kingdom of Italy. He was baptized on the day of his birth. He belonged to a simple farming family, the son of Emilio Beotti and his wife Ernesta Mori. His father was conscripted into the armed forces in World War I, while his mother, Ernesta Mori, was in charge of caring for and educating the family in the Catholic faith. Between 1916 and 1919, Beotti lost three brothers, leaving only his two sisters.

== Religious life ==
Between the war, work and studies, he gradually discovered his religious vocation. In 1925, Beotti entered the seminary of the diocese of Piacenza, and was ordained a priest on April 2, 1938. He began his ministry as parish priest in Borgonovo Val Tidone. He was known for his special sensitivity towards the needy families. He also gave his help to young people, fighting for the right to receive a quality education.

In 1940, he was sent to the city of Bardi, serving as parish priest in the village of Sidolo. In the year 1944, the city was invaded by military troops Germans Nazis serving in World War II. However, he did not hesitate to lend his assistance without making any exceptions: about a hundred Jews were welcomed. Resistors, guerrillas, fugitive soldiers, and prisoners who had escaped from war, the persecuted and wounded were also helped by him. During this troubled period, he did not hesitate to defend the rights of his parishioners and, for this reason, he was subjected to a criminal process that, luckily for him, was unsuccessful.

== Martyrdom ==
Faced with the various dangers that surrounded him, such as threats of arrest and Nazi reprisals, Beotti did not flee. He remained in his parish in constant prayer. On July 16, 1944, a Sunday, at mass he said: "If there is still a sacrifice left to stop this war, Lord, take me!" He was arrested and shot on the night of 20 July in Sidolo, together with the parish priest of Porcigatone, Francesco Delnevo, and the seminarian Italo Subacchi, who had taken refuge in the church with him. He was then 31 years old. Before being killed, he made the sign of the cross for the last time, holding firmly in his left hand the breviary with which he said the prayers. His murder was motivated by hatred of the Nazis for violating their Anti-Semitic policy.

== Beatification ==
The cause of the beatification of Beotti was opened on November 21, 2010. The conclusion of the process at the diocesan level took place on November 7, 2014, when the delivery of the testimonies to the Dicastery for the Causes of Saints. On May 20, 2023, the Pope Francis made official the decree recognizing his martyrdom. His beatification ceremony occurred on September 30, 2023, in the Piacenza Cathedral.
