= Palazzo Anguissola =

Palazzo Anguissola may refer to the following palaces in northern Italy:

- Palazzo Anguissola Antona Traversi, Milan
- Palazzo Anguissola di Cimafava Rocca, Piacenza
- Palazzo Anguissola di Grazzano, Piacenza

== See also ==
- Anguissola
