= Luisa Anguissola-Scotti =

Italian noblewoman and princess (1903–2008)

- Princess of the Holy Roman Empire Marchioness consort of Vescovato
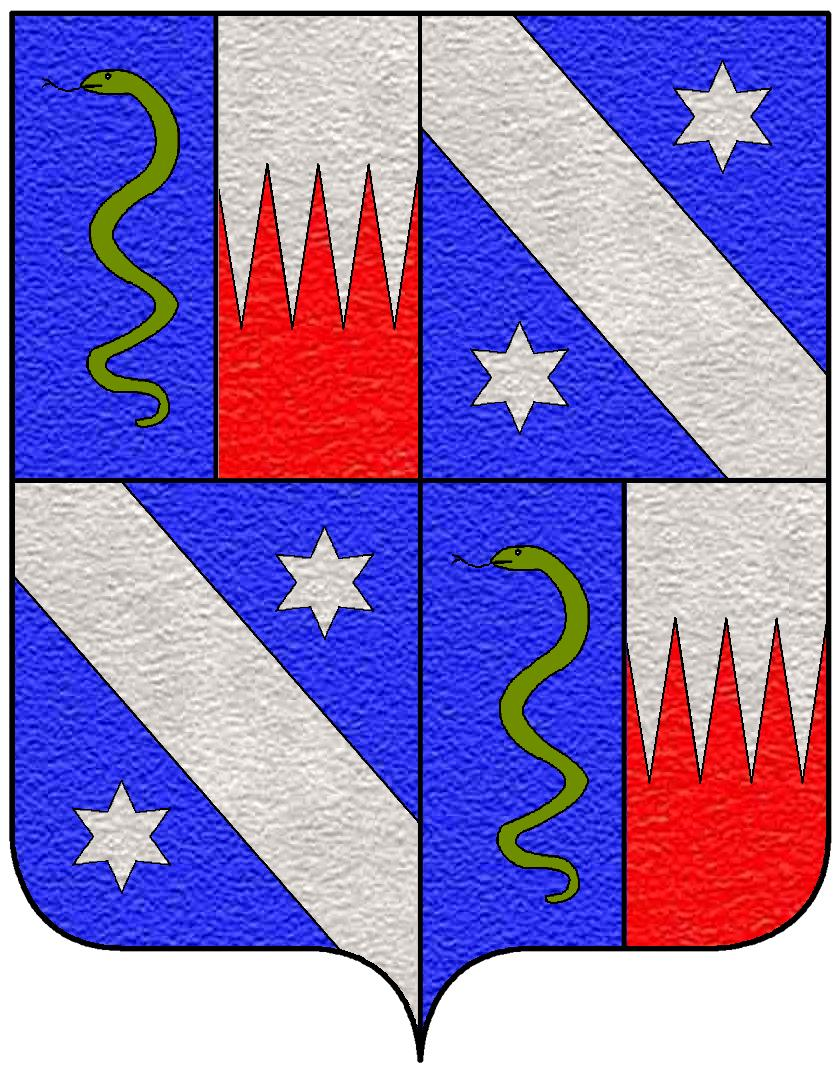
- Coat of arms: Coa fam ITA anguissola scotti2.jpg
- Tenure: 1937 – 1943
- Predecessor: Angiolina Aliana
- Successor: -
- Born: 29 March 1903
- Died: 26 June 2008 (aged 105); Rome
- Noble family: Anguissola-Scotti
- Spouse: Ferrante Vincenzo Gonzaga
- Issue: Maurizio Ferrante, Corrado Alessandro, Isabella
- Father: Ranuzio Anguissola-Scotti

Luisa Anguissola-Scotti (29 March 1903 – 26 June 2008) was an Italian noblewoman.

== Biography ==
She was the daughter of Ranuzio Anguissola-Scotti, Count of Podenzano and Ville, from the noble Anguissola-Scotti family, which originated in the mid-1700s from the marriage of Margherita Scotti to Girolamo Anguissola.

She inherited from her family the ownership of the castle in Agazzano, which passed into the possession of the Gonzaga di Vescovato, who had been related to the Scotti family since the 1400s.

She died in Rome in 2008.

== Descendants ==
On 20 October 1937 she married in Piacenza General Ferrante Vincenzo Gonzaga, Prince of the Holy Roman Empire, Head of the Gonzaga House, Marquess of Vescovato, and Marquess of Vodice, and they had three children:

- Maurizio Ferrante (born 1938), Prince, current Head of the Gonzaga family, 15th Marquess of Vescovato, 3rd Marquess of Vodice, Count of Villanova, Count of Cassolnovo, and Venetian patrician (born in Rome on 4 September 1938)
- Corrado Alessandro (Rome, 10 July 1941 - Piacenza, 23 January 2021), Prince, Lord of Vescovato, and Venetian patrician

== Bibliography ==
- Malacarne, Giancarlo (2010). Gonzaga, Genealogie di una dinastia [Gonzaga, Genealogies of a Dynasty] (in Italian). Modena: Il Bulino.
- Gonzaga, Maurizio Ferrante (2013). Assalto al castello [Assault on the Castle] (in Italian). Asola.
