= Gragnano (disambiguation) =

Gragnano is a municipality in the Metropolitan City of Naples, Campania, Italy.

Gragnano may also refer to:

- Gragnano, a frazione (borough) of Capannori, municipality in the Province of Lucca, Tuscany, Italy
- Gragnano, a frazione of Sansepolcro, municipality in the Province of Arezzo, Tuscany, Italy
- Gragnano Trebbiense, a municipality in the Province of Piacenza, Emilia-Romagna, Italy
- Gragnano Products, Inc., an American food company
- Società Sportiva Calcio Gragnano, an Italian association football club based in Gragnano, Campania
