= Luigi Villoresi (botanist) =

Italian agronomist, botanist, and landscape architect

- Born: 16 November 1779; Desio
- Died: 1823 (aged 43–44); Monza
- Occupations: Agronomist; Botanist; Landscape architect
- Era: 1700

Luigi Villoresi (Desio, November 16, 1779 - Monza, 1823) was an Italian agronomist, botanist and landscape architect, garden designer and rose hybridizer.

== Biography ==
The Villoresi family originates from the Kingdom of Valencia. The surname ("de Villores" in Spanish) derives from the namesake village where the family’s former residence, now the town hall, is still located. Engaged in the production and trade of wool, knowledgeable in the arts, botany, and pharmacy (learned during the Moors' occupation of Spain), in the 15th century, they moved to the Mugello region in Tuscany. From there, they established initial contacts with the Medici family and practiced as botanists, gardeners, and pharmacists in Prato, Florence, and Livorno. The first known name is Giandomenico, a gardener for the grand ducal household during the time of Leopold I around the mid-18th century.

His son Antonio moved, on the grand duke’s commission, to Lombardy to work as a gardener for the Austrian Viceroy Ferdinand of Austria-Este. In this role, he created several parks and villas in the Milan area (Villa Tittoni Traversi), gaining experience that was passed on to his son Luigi.

Luigi Villoresi graduated as a surveyor from the University of Pavia and was responsible, from 1802 to 1823, for the gardens and park of the Villa Reale in Monza. He planted the long row of plane trees that adorn the avenue leading to the villa, and during these works, he met Luigi Canonica.

Villoresi was also tasked with managing all the festivities held in the villa’s gardens. In 1805, during the coronation of Napoleon as King of Italy on May 26, he was responsible for organizing the scenery. He sent one hundred carts of flowers to Milan and transported, under his responsibility, the famous Iron Crown, always kept in the Monza Cathedral.

Canonica and Villoresi collaborated not only on the Monza Palace but also on the creation of the gardens of Villa Melzi d'Eril in Bellagio, commissioned by Duke Francesco Melzi d'Eril. Villoresi also worked on other significant gardens, such as those of the Villa Belgiojoso Bonaparte in Milan, already designed by Leopold Pollack, and took on less prestigious commissions, such as the Agazzano Castle, the gardens of Villa Alari in Cernusco sul Naviglio (MI), and the gardens of the former Perego Palace in Cremnago, as well as Villa Rescalli in Busto Garolfo.

Luigi Villoresi is also remembered for founding the first botanical school in Lombardy, located within the Monza Park, and for being the first rose hybridizer in Italy. The rose named after him, "Bella di Monza" (Modoetiensis Villoresi), is famous, but he created more than twenty new rose varieties of the Bengal and China types.

== Descendants ==
Luigi Villoresi married Teresa Baffa, who gave him one daughter and seven sons, two of whom became engineers and five priests. Eugenio Villoresi, the second-born, is the most well-known, having built the Canale Villoresi. The sixth-born, Andrea (a Barnabite who took the name Luigi in honor of his father), founded the Institute of Poor Clerics in Monza in 1862, where over 700 priests were trained according to the teachings of his mentor, Father Rosmini.

Four other sons became priests: Don Antonio in Desio, Don Federigo in Gallarate, Don Gaetano (Ranieri) in Socconago (Busto Arsizio), and Don Giosuè in Fabbrica Durini. The last son, Filippo, became an engineer and, like his father, dedicated himself to designing parks and gardens. The daughter, Amalia, was a lady-in-waiting to Vicereine Amalia of Bavaria and married Giuseppe Meraviglia of Vanzago. Their son, Luigi Meraviglia, collaborated with his uncle Eugenio in designing the Canale Villoresi.

There were many Luigis in the Villoresi family: besides the father and the Barnabite son, there was also a grandson. The grandson Luigi, son of Eugenio Villoresi, along with his brother Giuseppe, both engineers, worked as construction managers for the canal designed by their father. They also designed the Como–Brunate Funicular, the San Pellegrino Funicular, and the grand hydraulic work known as the "Botte Villoresi", beneath the Secchia River for the reclamation of the Mantuan countryside (over 30,000 hectares of land). On November 19, 1905, he was appointed Knight of Labor. Gigi Villoresi, great-grandson of the botanist, was one of Italy’s most famous race car drivers. He raced for the Maserati, Ferrari, and Lancia teams from 1935 to 1958, when he won first place in the prestigious Acropolis Rally in Greece. Among the descendants is also Renato Villoresi (1917–1944), Captain of the Royal Army Artillery, soldier, and partisan, martyr of the Fosse Ardeatine, awarded the Gold Medal of Military Valor.
