= Palazzo Anguissola di Grazzano =

1774 palace in Piacenza, Italy

Coordinates: 45.05082°N 9.69984°E

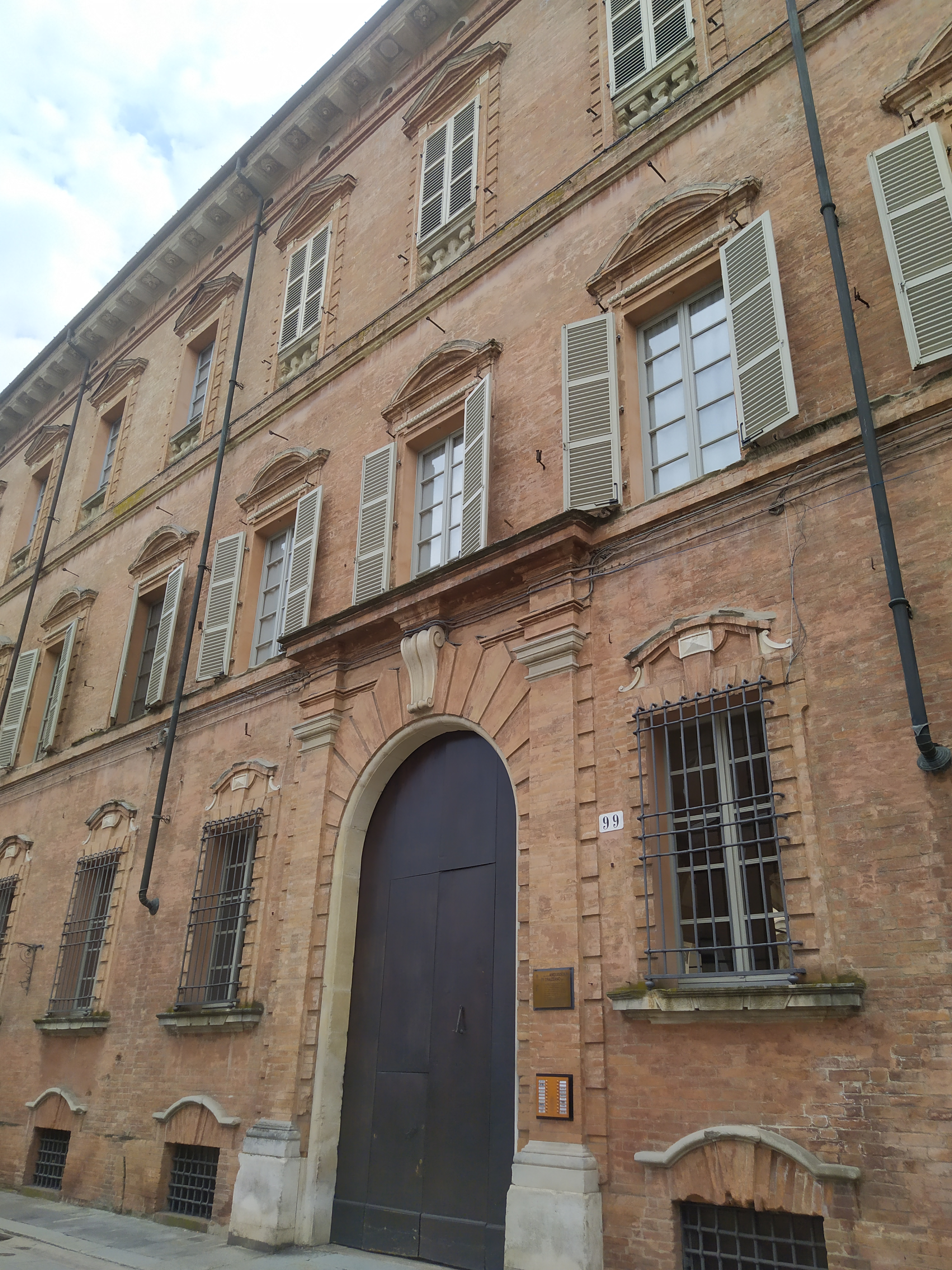

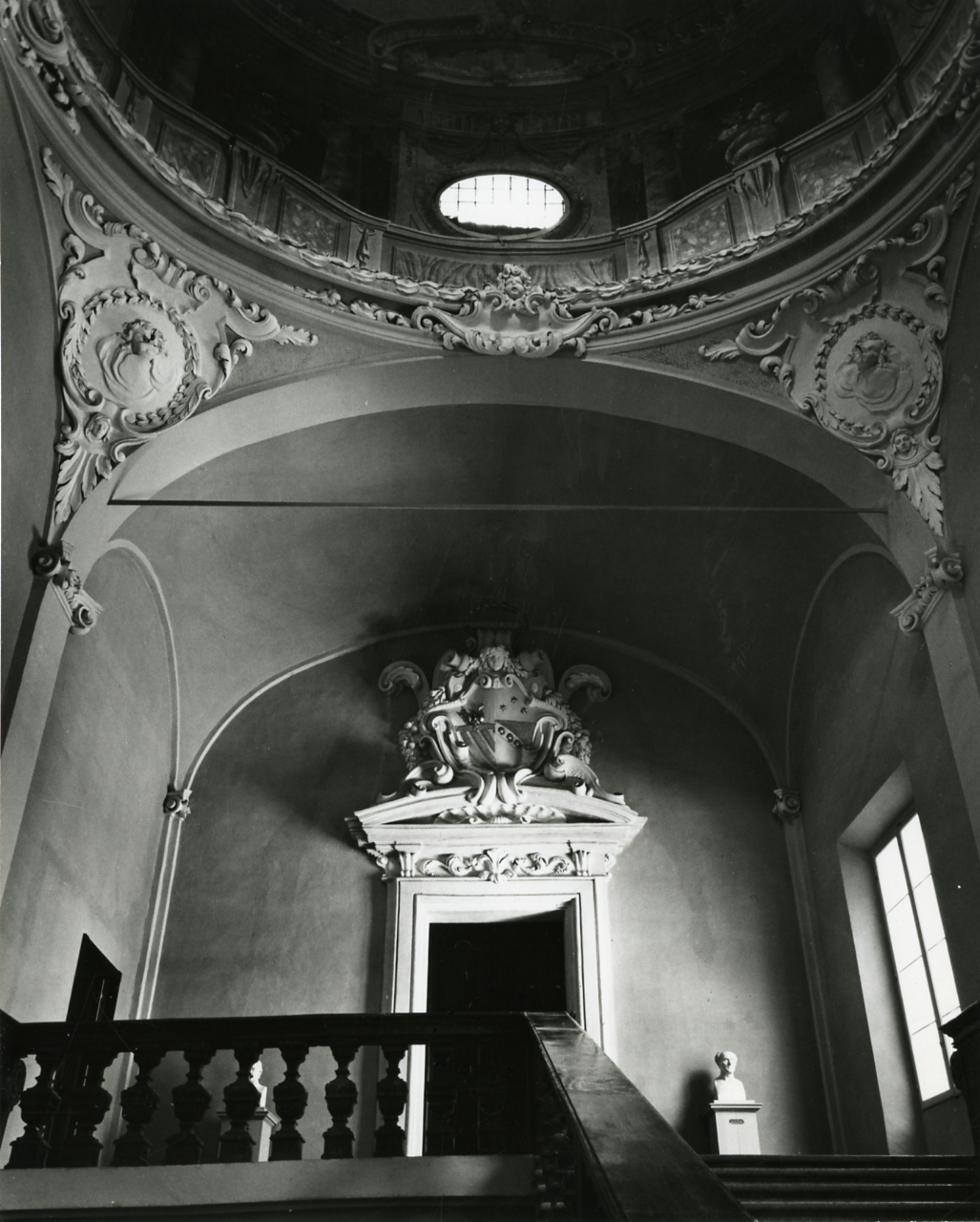

The Palazzo Anguissola di Grazzano is a late-Baroque and early Neoclassical architecture-style palace located at Via Roma #99 in central Piacenza, region of Emilia-Romagna in Italy.

== History ==
The palace was commissioned in 1774 by the Marquis Ranuccio Anguissola, who utilized Cosimo Morelli as the architect. The sober three story brick facade is notable for the asymmetric placement of the main entrance. The axis though leads to the center of the more symmetric courtyard. The courtyard details were decorated by Alessandro della Nave and Antonio Villa.
