= Borgonovo Val Tidone =

Borgonovo Val Tidone Burgnöv (Emilian)
- Comune
- Comune di Borgonovo Val Tidone
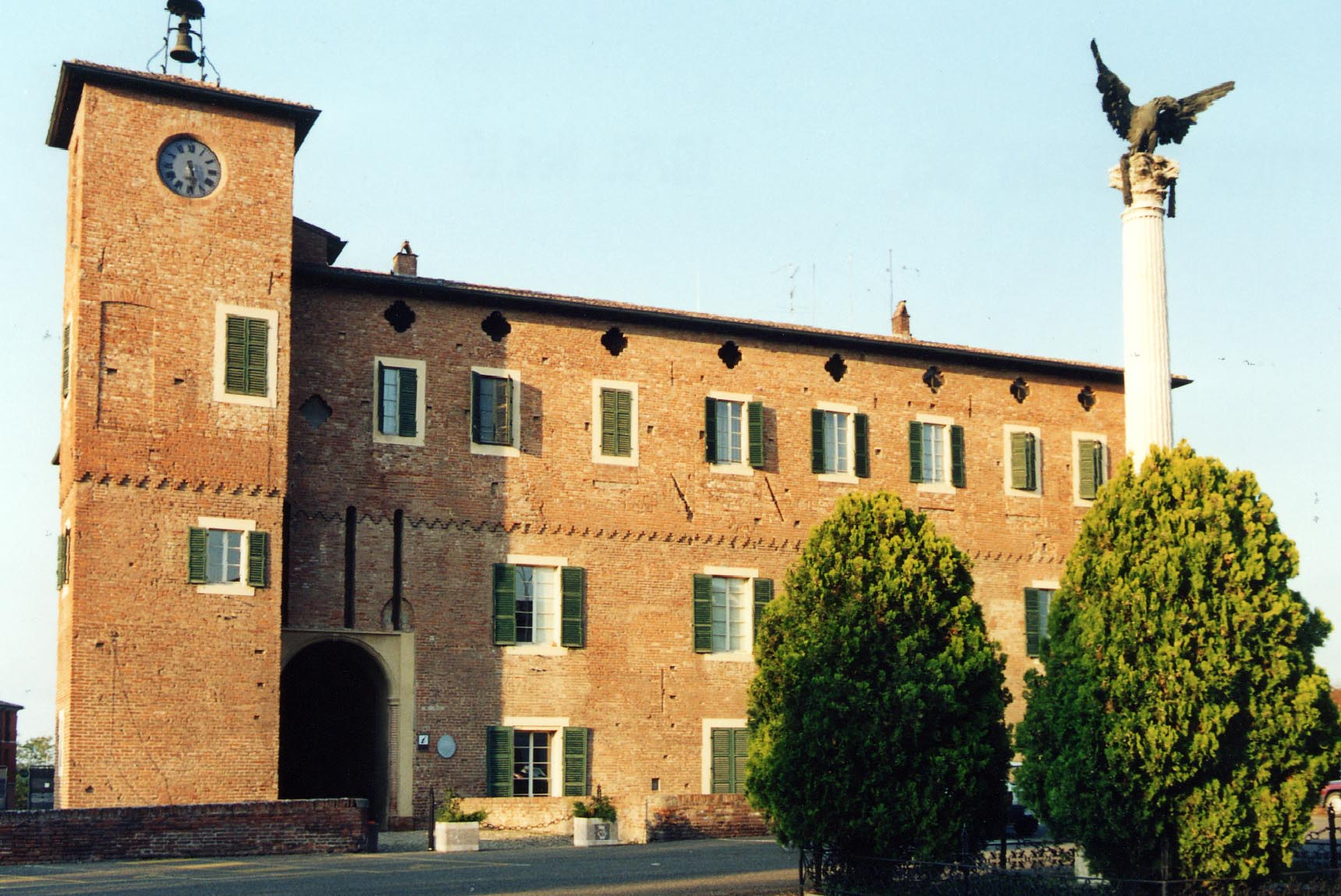
- The Rocca (castle), the current town hall

- Coat of arms

- Location within Italy Location within Emilia-Romagna
- Coordinates: 45°1′N 9°27′E
- Country: Italy
- Region: Emilia-Romagna
- Province: Piacenza (PC)
- Frazioni: Agazzino, Bilegno, Breno, Castelnovo Val Tidone, Corano, Fabbiano, Mottaziana

Government
  - Mayor: Monica Patelli

Area
  - Total: 51.22 km^{2} (19.78 sq mi)
- Elevation: 114 m (374 ft)

Population (30 April 2017)
  - Total: 7,904
  - Density: 154.3/km^{2} (399.7/sq mi)
- Demonym: Borgonovesi
- Time zone: UTC+1 (CET)
  - Summer (DST): UTC+2 (CEST)
- Postal code: 29011
- Dialing code: 0523
- Patron saint: Assumption of Mary
- Saint day: August 15
- Website: Official website

Borgonovo Val Tidone (Piacentino: Burgnöv, IPA: [burgˈnøːv] or [burgˈnoːv]) is a comune (municipality) in the province of Piacenza in the Italian region Emilia-Romagna, located about 160 kilometres (99 mi) northwest of Bologna and about 20 kilometres (12 mi) west of Piacenza.

Borgonovo Val Tidone borders the following municipalities: Agazzano, Alta Val Tidone, Castel San Giovanni, Gragnano Trebbiense, Pianello Val Tidone, Rottofreno, Sarmato, and Ziano Piacentino.

The frazione of Bilegno was the birthplace of the luthier Giovanni Battista Guadagnini. The town was founded in 1196 by the commune of Piacenza as a fortified outpost with a rectangular plan. This rocca is now the town hall.

== Notable people ==
- Francesco Alberoni (1929–2023), sociologist and journalist
- Ettore Boiardi (1897-1985), chef, creator of the Chef Boyardee brand
- Eliseu Maria Coroli (1900-1982), missionary bishop in Brazil
- Matteo Corradini (born 1975), writer
- Flaviano Labò (1927–1991), operatic tenor
- Fabio Paratici (born July 13, 1972), managing director of football, Tottenham Hotspur FC

== Twin towns ==
Borgonovo Val Tidone is twinned with:

- Dunellen, New Jersey, United States
- Fontenay Sous Bois, France
