= Palazzo Anguissola di Cimafava Rocca =

Building in Piacenza, Italy

Coordinates: 45.04918°N 9.69378°E

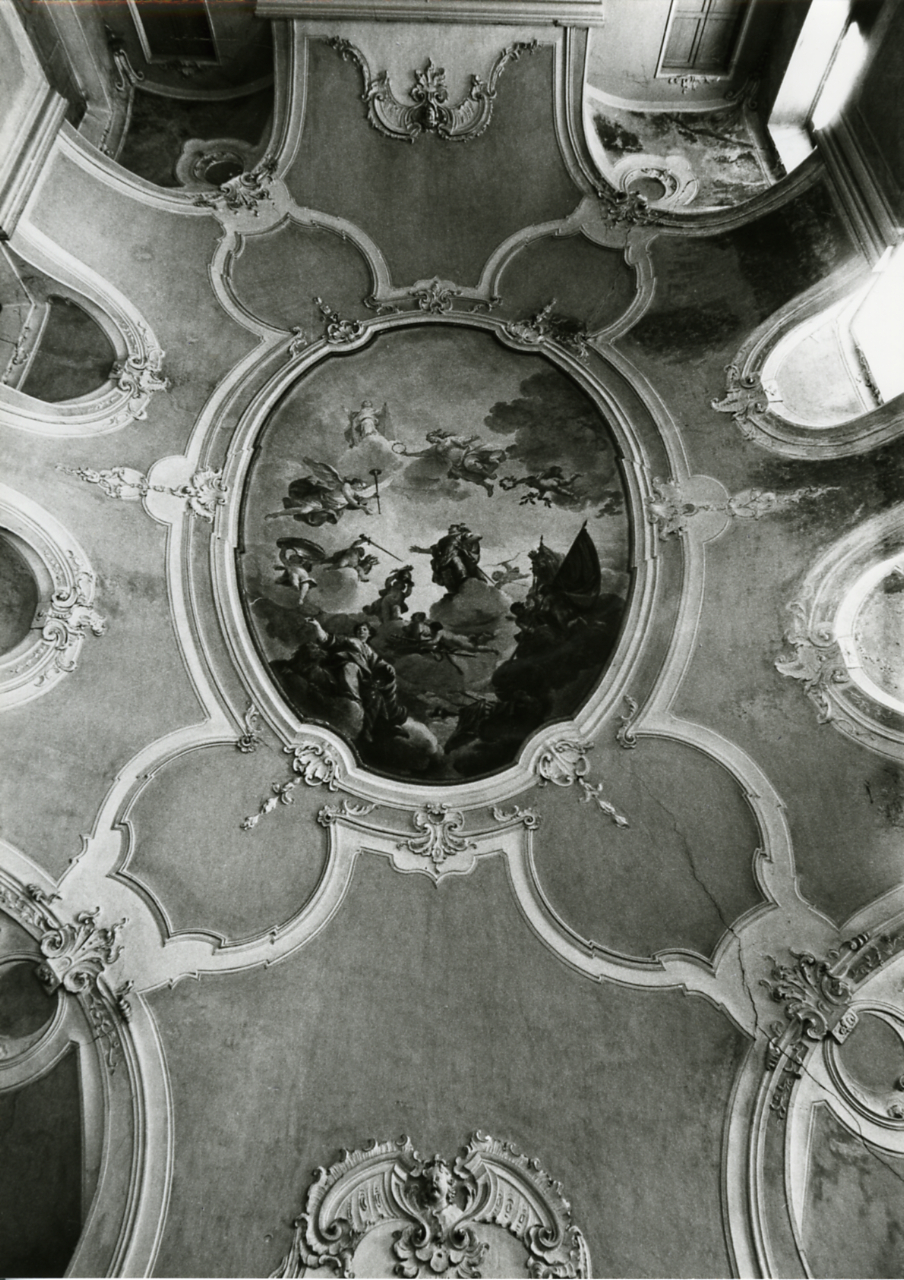

The Palazzo Anguissola di Cimafava Rocca, also called Palazzo Anguissola Rocca is an 18th-century aristocratic palace located on Via Pietro Giordano #2, west and across the street from the Teatro Municipale in Piacenza, Region of Emilia Romagna, Italy.

== History ==
The long three-story facade with 19 windows on Via Giordano shields three courtyards. The main portal surmounted with a balcony is gated with iron screen depicting a sun. The scenographic main staircase leads to a main floor with a large salon d'onore elegantly decorated with stuccoes and frescoes depicting the life of Alexander the Great. The decoration of the ball room has been attributed to Adalberto Della Nave, Antonio Villa, and Giovanni Battista Ercole.
