= Piozzano =

Comune in Emilia-Romagna

- Comune
- Comune di Piozzano
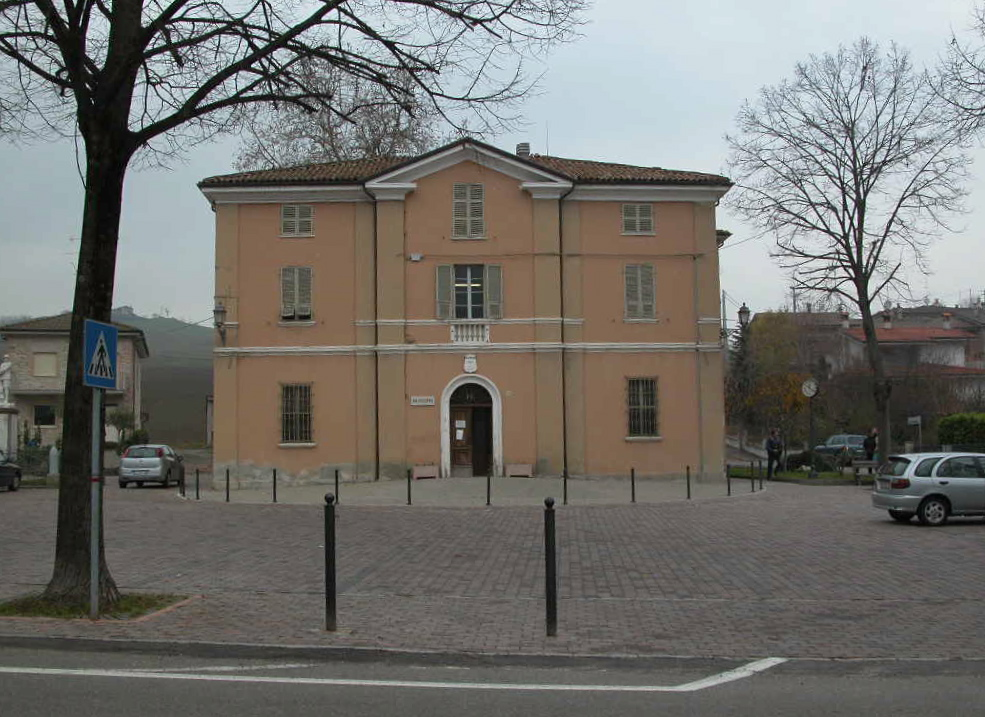

- Location within Italy Location within Emilia-Romagna
- Coordinates: 44°56′N 9°30′E
- Country: Italy
- Region: Emilia-Romagna
- Province: Piacenza (PC)
- Frazioni: Groppo Arcelli, Vidiano Soprano, Pomaro, San Gabriele, San Nazaro, Monteventano, Montecanino, Canova

Government
  - Mayor: Carlo Brigati

Area
  - Total: 43.5 km^{2} (16.8 sq mi)
- Elevation: 222 m (728 ft)

Population (31 December 2017)
  - Total: 624
  - Density: 14.3/km^{2} (37.2/sq mi)
- Demonym: Piozzanesi
- Time zone: UTC+1 (CET)
  - Summer (DST): UTC+2 (CEST)
- Postal code: 29010
- Dialing code: 0523
- Website: Official website

Piozzano (Piacentino: Piusàn) is a comune (municipality) in the Province of Piacenza in the Italian region Emilia-Romagna, located about 150 kilometres (93 mi) northwest of Bologna and about 20 kilometres (12 mi) southwest of Piacenza.

Piozzano borders the following municipalities: Agazzano, Alta Val Tidone, Bobbio, Gazzola, Pianello Val Tidone, Travo.
