= Anguissola =

Anguissola (pronounced [aŋɡwisˈsɔːla]) is an Italian surname from Piacenza, historically borne by a local noble family. Notable people with the surname include:

- Anna Maria Anguissola (c. 1555–c. 1611), Italian painter
- Caterina Anguissola (c. 1508–1550), Italian noblewoman
- Elena Anguissola (c. 1532–1584), Italian painter and nun
- Lucia Anguissola (c. 1537–c. 1567), Italian painter
- Luisa Anguissola-Scotti (1903–2008), Italian noblewoman
- Sofonisba Anguissola (c. 1532–1625), Italian painter

== See also ==
- Palazzo Anguissola (disambiguation)
- Anguissola (crater)
