= Pianello Val Tidone =

- Comune
- Comune di Pianello Val Tidone
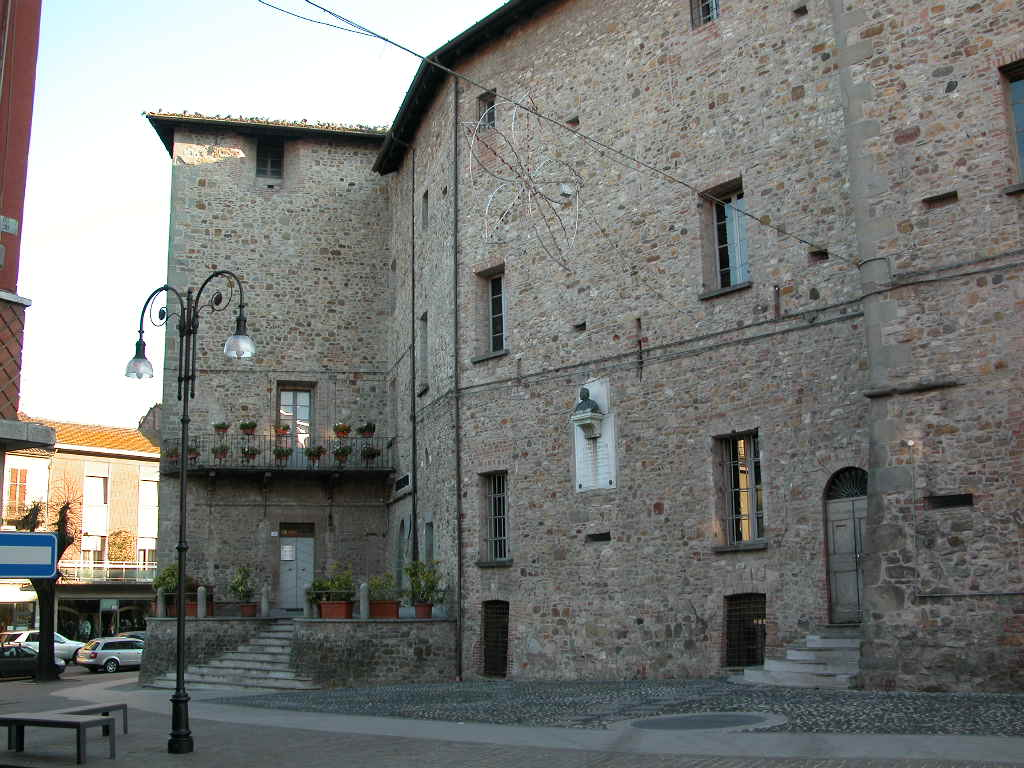
- Town hall.

- Location within Italy Location within Emilia-Romagna
- Coordinates: 44°57′N 9°24′E
- Country: Italy
- Region: Emilia-Romagna
- Province: Piacenza (PC)
- Frazioni: Arcello, Azzano, Cà del Diavolo, Casa Bruciata, Casanova, Case Comaschi, Case Gazzoli, Case Gramonti, Case Rebuffi, Chiarone, Fontanese, Fravica, Gabbiano, Gadignano, Morago, Pradaglia, Rocca d'Olgisio, Rocca Pulzana, Santa Giustina, Vaie, Valle

Government
  - Mayor: Mauro Lodigiani

Area
  - Total: 36.29 km^{2} (14.01 sq mi)
- Elevation: 192 m (630 ft)

Population (31 May 2022)
  - Total: 2,169
  - Density: 59.77/km^{2} (154.8/sq mi)
- Demonym: Pianellesi
- Time zone: UTC+1 (CET)
  - Summer (DST): UTC+2 (CEST)
- Postal code: 29010
- Dialing code: 0523
- Website: Official website

Pianello Val Tidone (Piacentino: Pianél) is a comune (municipality) in the Province of Piacenza in the Italian region Emilia-Romagna, located about 160 kilometres (99 mi) northwest of Bologna and about 25 kilometres (16 mi) southwest of Piacenza.

Pianello Val Tidone borders the following municipalities: Agazzano, Alta Val Tidone, Borgonovo Val Tidone, Piozzano.

== Main sights ==
Sights include:

- Municipal Castle (Rocca)
- Rocca d'Olgisio, a castle originally built on a spur outside the town in the 9th century and used by the Dal verme family of lords and condottieri.
- Church of San Maurizio and San Colombano (1250, enlarged in 1377)
- Archaeological Museum of Val Tidone

== Culture ==
Pianello Val Tidone yearly hosts the Val Tidone International Music Events, with international instrumental and composition competitions.
