= Scotti family =

Historical noble family from Piacenza

Scotti Douglas Scotti; Scotti Douglas
- Noble family
- Country: Italy
- Origin: Piacenza
- Founded: 12th century (documented)
- Estates: Vigoleno, Sarmato, Agazzano, Fombio and other estates in the Piacenza area
- Branches: Vigoleno, Sarmato, Fombio, Agazzano, Castelbosco and others

The Scotti are an Italian historical and noble family originating in Piacenza, in northern Italy. Several branches later became known as Douglas Scotti or Scotti Douglas. Documented from the Middle Ages, the family rose to prominence through mercantile and financial activities and played an important role in the political life of medieval Piacenza.

The family's political prominence reached its height under Alberto Scotti, who became lord of Piacenza in 1290 and emerged as a significant figure in the political conflicts of northern Italy involving the Guelphs and Ghibellines and the Visconti of Milan.

Over the following centuries, the family divided into several branches associated with estates and lordships including Vigoleno, Sarmato, Agazzano and Fombio. Some of these branches adopted the compound surname Douglas Scotti or Scotti Douglas. The name reflected a genealogical tradition connecting the family with the Scottish House of Douglas, although the claimed medieval Scottish descent is not established by contemporary documentary evidence.

== History ==
=== Origins ===
According to the Enciclopedia Italiana, the documented genealogy of the Scotti begins with Manfredo and Davide, who lived in the 12th century. Davide's descendant Lanfranco became the ancestor of several branches of the family.

Lanfranco's four sons were associated with different lines: Giovanni with branches later connected with Vigoleno, Sarmato and Fombio; Ruffino with Mamago and Castelbosco; Rolando with Passano; and Rinaldo with Gravago and Varsi. The latter lines subsequently became extinct.

The family is documented in the political and commercial institutions of Piacenza from the late 12th century. Rinaldo I Scotti served as consul of the merchants in 1184, while Lanfranco was a member of the societas populi in 1221.

=== Mercantile and financial activities ===
During the 13th century, the Scotti were among the wealthy merchant families of Piacenza. Their economic prominence was based on commerce and finance. The Enciclopedia Italiana describes members of the family as wealthy mercatores and records the activities of the societas Scotorum in Italy, France and the eastern Mediterranean.

Their commercial position was accompanied by an increasing role in communal politics. The family was associated with the popular political movement in Piacenza. It supported the pro-popular government of Antonio Saviagatta in 1250, while Rinaldo II Scotti became captain of the people in 1260.

In 1267, Rinaldo II was appointed podestà of Cremona. He subsequently participated in negotiations concerning the submission of Piacenza to Charles I of Anjou in 1271.

=== Alberto Scotti and the lordship of Piacenza ===
Alberto Scotti was the most prominent medieval member of the family. A son of Giovanni Scotti and Mabilia Fontana, he was politically active by the early 1270s.

In 1290, Alberto became captain of the people, defender and lord of Piacenza. Under his leadership, the family's economic influence developed into wider political and territorial power.

At the height of his power, his influence extended towards Bergamo and Tortona. In 1302, at the head of a Guelph coalition, he contributed to the defeat of Matteo I Visconti and became involved in the political affairs of Milan.

Alberto lost control of Piacenza in 1304, later regained power, and continued to struggle against local opponents and the Visconti. In 1317 he was defeated by Galeazzo I Visconti and confined at Crema, where he died in 1318.

His period of rule coincided with a broader transition in the family's history from mercantile and urban political activity towards increasing involvement with landed estates and territorial lordships.

=== Fourteenth and fifteenth centuries ===
In 1335 Francesco Scotti, known as il Milite, recovered control of Piacenza. Following conflict with Azzone Visconti, he obtained Fiorenzuola in 1336, which he relinquished two years later.

His descendants established later branches of the family. Giovanni became the progenitor of the Scotti counts of Agazzano, while Francesco II was created count of Vigoleno by Giovanni Maria Visconti in 1404.

=== The Douglas tradition ===
A longstanding genealogical tradition connected the Scotti of Piacenza with the Scottish House of Douglas.

According to the account recorded by the Enciclopedia Italiana, a figure identified as "Sholto du Glasse" was said to have been the father of a William who came to Italy with Charlemagne and settled in Piacenza. The encyclopedia describes this account as a late legend and distinguishes it from the documented medieval genealogy of the family.

The official guide to the Scotti Douglas archive at the State Archives of Piacenza likewise discusses the Scottish derivation as a later genealogical tradition rather than part of the family's securely documented medieval origins.

The tradition nevertheless became part of the family's later historical identity. Sources associate an imperial act of 12 February 1414 by Emperor Sigismund with territorial investitures granted to Alberto II Scotti and with the use of the Douglas designation in reference to the family's traditional Scottish ancestry.

Branches descending from Alberto II subsequently used the names Douglas Scotti or Scotti Douglas. The cited sources distinguish the documented historical use of the Douglas name from the later genealogical tradition claiming medieval descent from the Scottish House of Douglas.

== Branches ==
Over the centuries, the family divided into several branches, generally distinguished by their principal estates or territorial associations.

=== Vigoleno ===
The branch associated with Vigoleno became one of the family's principal lines. Francesco II Scotti was created count of Vigoleno in 1404 by Giovanni Maria Visconti.

=== Sarmato ===
A branch descending from Francesco, son of Alberto II Scotti, became associated with Sarmato and used the Douglas Scotti name.

Sarmato was among the territories associated with Alberto II Scotti, together with Carpaneto, Chero, Fontanafredda and Vicomarino.

=== Agazzano ===
The line associated with Agazzano descended from Giovanni, a descendant of Francesco il Milite, identified by the Enciclopedia Italiana as the ancestor of the Scotti counts of Agazzano.

=== Fombio ===
Another branch was associated with Fombio. During the 19th century, the archival holdings of the Sarmato and Fombio lines were brought together following the marriage of Countess Isabella Scotti Douglas of Sarmato and Count Guglielmo Scotti Douglas of Fombio.

== Residences and cultural heritage ==
Different branches of the family were historically associated with castles, palaces and estates in Piacenza and its surrounding territory. Places connected in historical sources with branches of the Scotti include Vigoleno, Sarmato, Agazzano, Fombio, Castell'Arquato, Fiorenzuola d'Arda and Carpaneto.

=== Palazzo Scotti di Sarmato ===
The Scotti of Sarmato were associated with a palace in Piacenza. According to the Italian Ministry of Culture's national cultural heritage catalogue, the family inherited a palace near Sant'Agostino in 1671 and subsequently incorporated adjacent buildings. In 1772, Count Domenico Maria Douglas Scotti began a major reconstruction campaign, completed in 1782.

The reconstruction has been associated on stylistic grounds with the architect Cosimo Morelli, and the building contained painted and fresco decoration.

== Archives ==
An extensive body of documentation relating to the family is preserved at the State Archives of Piacenza.

The Scotti Douglas of Fombio and Sarmato archive comprises 815 archival units, including 802 bundles containing documents and registers and 13 boxes containing 959 parchment units.

The collection resulted from the convergence of the archives of the Fombio and Sarmato branches during the second half of the 19th century. Its principal portion was deposited in 1969 by Laura and Giuseppe Feltrinelli, heirs of Countess Isabella Scotti Douglas of Fombio, with further material deposited in 1978.

A detailed guide to the collection was prepared by Elena Nironi and Valentina Inzani under the scientific direction of Anna Riva and published by the State Archives of Piacenza in 2011.

== Notable members ==
- Rinaldo I Scotti, consul of the merchants of Piacenza in 1184.
- Rinaldo II Scotti, captain of the people of Piacenza in 1260 and later podestà of Cremona.
- Alberto Scotti (died 1318), lord of Piacenza.
- Francesco Scotti, called il Milite, who recovered control of Piacenza in 1335.
- Francesco II Scotti, created count of Vigoleno in 1404.
- Alberto II Scotti, associated with territorial investitures and with the historical adoption of the Douglas designation by branches of the family.
- Domenico Maria Douglas Scotti, count of Sarmato, associated with the late-18th-century reconstruction of Palazzo Scotti di Sarmato.

== Historiography and genealogy ==
The historiography of the Scotti family combines medieval documentary evidence with later genealogical traditions.

Modern scholarship has reconstructed the family's medieval political history from chronicles, communal records and archival material. Riccardo Rao's biography of Alberto Scotti in the Dizionario Biografico degli Italiani, for example, draws on medieval narrative and documentary sources, including the Annales Placentini and the Registrum magnum of Piacenza.

The claimed Scottish origin belongs to a different evidentiary tradition. Both the Enciclopedia Italiana and the official guide to the Scotti Douglas archives distinguish the documented medieval history of the family from the later tradition connecting it with the House of Douglas.

== See also ==
- Piacenza
- Sarmato
- Agazzano
- Fombio
- Castell'Arquato
- Guelphs and Ghibellines
- House of Visconti
- House of Douglas
