= Gazzola =

- Comune
- Comune di Gazzola
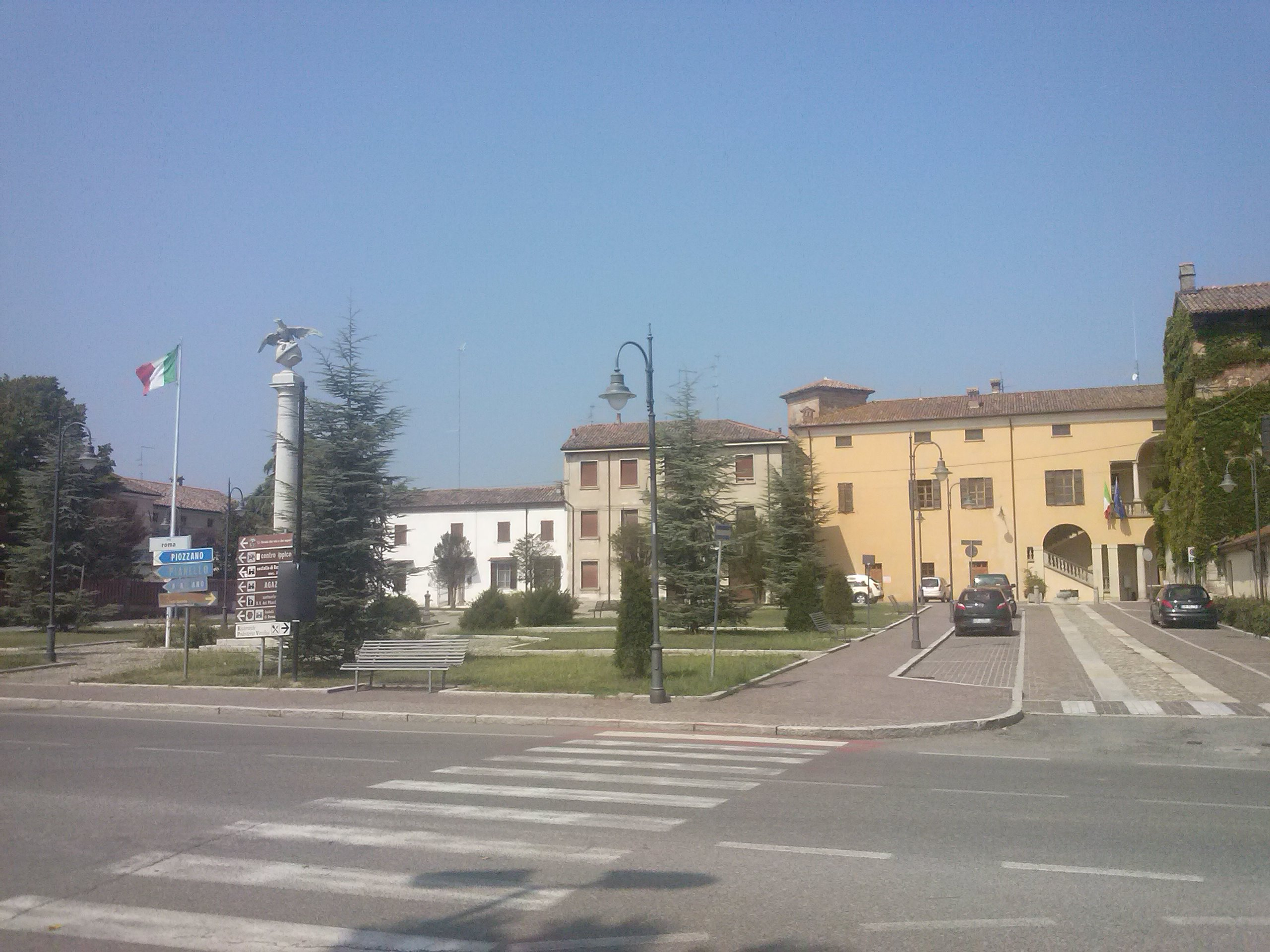

- Location within Italy Location within Emilia-Romagna
- Coordinates: 44°58′N 9°33′E
- Country: Italy
- Region: Emilia-Romagna
- Province: Province of Piacenza (PC)

Government
  - Mayor: Simone Maserati

Area
  - Total: 44.1 km^{2} (17.0 sq mi)

Population (Dec. 2004)
  - Total: 1,856
  - Density: 42.1/km^{2} (109/sq mi)
- Time zone: UTC+1 (CET)
  - Summer (DST): UTC+2 (CEST)
- Postal code: 29010
- Dialing code: 0523
- Website: Official website

Gazzola (Piacentino: Gaśöla, IPA: [gaˈzøːlɐ] or [gaˈzoːlɐ]) is a comune (municipality) in the Province of Piacenza in the Italian region Emilia-Romagna, located about 150 kilometres (93 mi) northwest of Bologna and about 15 kilometres (9 mi) southwest of Piacenza. As of 31 December 2004, it had a population of 1,856 and an area of 44.1 square kilometres (17.0 mi^{2}).

Gazzola borders the following municipalities: Agazzano, Gossolengo, Gragnano Trebbiense, Piozzano, Rivergaro, and Travo.

== Demographic evolution ==
Historical population

Year	Pop.	±%
1861	2,528	—
1871	2,600	+2.8%
1881	2,667	+2.6%
1901	3,026	+13.5%
1911	3,260	+7.7%

Year	Pop.	±%
1921	3,541	+8.6%
1931	3,294	−7.0%
1936	3,187	−3.2%
1951	2,913	−8.6%
1961	2,341	−19.6%

Year	Pop.	±%
1971	1,666	−28.8%
1981	1,421	−14.7%
1991	1,473	+3.7%
2001	1,676	+13.8%

Source: Data from ISTAT
