= Agazzano =

- Comune
- Comune di Agazzano
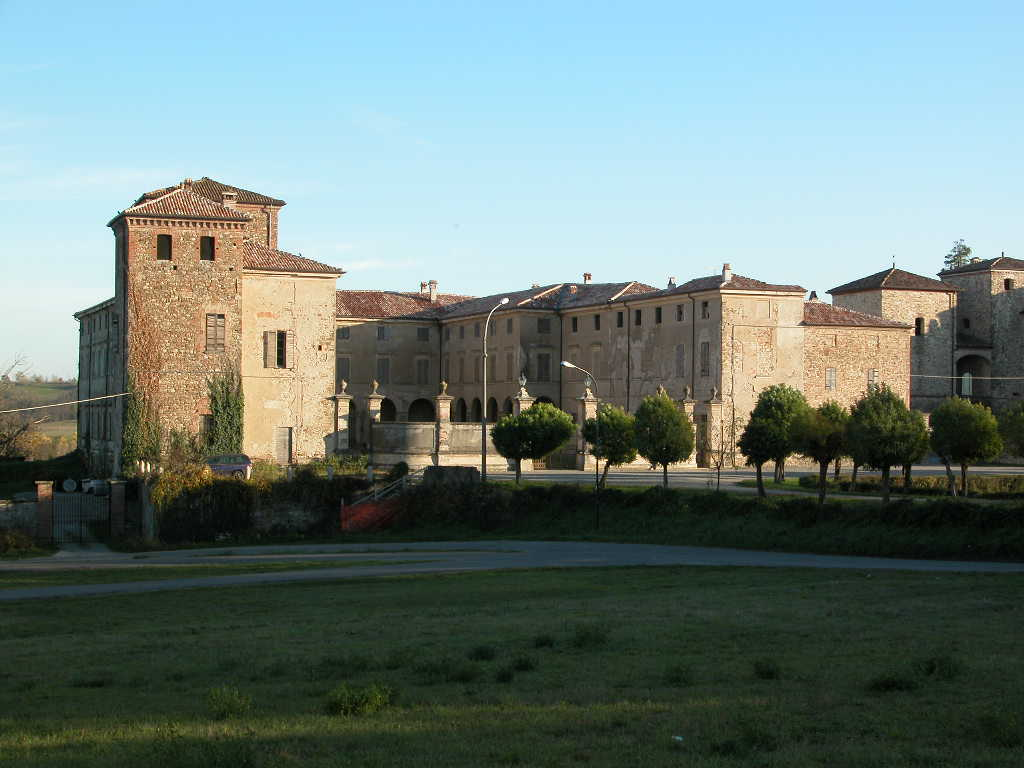
- Agazzano Castle

- Location of Agazzano in Italy Agazzano (Emilia-Romagna)
- Coordinates: 44°57′N 9°31′E
- Country: Italy
- Region: Emilia-Romagna
- Province: Piacenza (PC)
- Frazioni: Bastardina, Cantone, Montebolzone, Sarturano, Tavernago, Verdeto

Government
  - Mayor: Maurizio Cigalini

Area
  - Total: 36.15 km^{2} (13.96 sq mi)
- Elevation: 187 m (614 ft)

Population (31 May 2022)
  - Total: 1,981
  - Density: 54.80/km^{2} (141.9/sq mi)
- Demonym: Agazzanesi
- Time zone: UTC+1 (CET)
  - Summer (DST): UTC+2 (CEST)
- Postal code: 29010
- Dialing code: 0523
- Patron saint: Santa Maria Assunta
- Saint day: August 15
- Website: Official website

Agazzano (Piacentino: Gasàn) is a comune (municipality) in the Province of Piacenza in the Italian region Emilia-Romagna, located about 150 kilometres (93 mi) northwest of Bologna and about 20 kilometres (12 mi) southwest of Piacenza.

Among the main sites is the much refurbished and amplified Agazzano Castle, still a private residence of descendants of the original owners.

Agazzano borders the following municipalities: Borgonovo Val Tidone, Gazzola, Gragnano Trebbiense, Pianello Val Tidone, Piozzano.
