= Gragnano Trebbiense =

- Comune
- Comune di Gragnano Trebbiense
- Coat of arms

- Location within Italy Location within Emilia-Romagna
- Coordinates: 45°1′N 9°34′E
- Country: Italy
- Region: Emilia-Romagna
- Province: Piacenza (PC)
- Frazioni: Campremoldo Sopra, Campremoldo Sotto, Casaliggio, Gragnanino

Government
  - Mayor: Patrizia Calza

Area
  - Total: 34.6 km^{2} (13.4 sq mi)
- Elevation: 82 m (269 ft)

Population (31 May 2007)
  - Total: 4,147
  - Density: 120/km^{2} (310/sq mi)
- Demonym: Gragnanesi
- Time zone: UTC+1 (CET)
  - Summer (DST): UTC+2 (CEST)
- Postal code: 29010
- Dialing code: 0523
- Website: Official website

Gragnano Trebbiense (Piacentino: Gragnàn) is a comune (municipality) in the Province of Piacenza in the Italian region, Emilia-Romagna, located about 150 kilometres (93 mi) northwest of Bologna and about 11 kilometres (7 mi) southwest of Piacenza.

The battle of the Trebia was fought in Gragnano's territory in 218 BC.
