= Lago Nero =

Lago Nero, Italian for "Black Lake", may refer to:

Switzerland

- Lago Nero (Ticino)

Italy

- Lago Nero (Bergamo), a lake in the Province of Bergamo
- Lago Nero (Piacenza), a lake in the Province of Piacenza
- Lago Nero (Pistoia), a lake in the Province of Pistoia
- Lago Nero (Valsesia), a lake in the Province of Vercelli

== See also ==
- Lagonegro, a municipality of the Province of Potenza, Basilicata
- Black Lake (disambiguation)
