= Lake Bino =

Glacial lake in the province of Piacenza, Italy

- Lago Bino
- Interactive map of Lake Bino
- Location: Ferriere, Province of Piacenza, Emilia-Romagna, Italy
- Coordinates: 44°37′08″N 9°33′00″E
- Type: Glacial lake
- Basin countries: Italy

Lake Bino is a glacial lake located in the Ligurian Apennines in the Province of Piacenza, Emilia-Romagna, Italy. It is actually composed of two bodies of water at the same elevation, very close to each other: Lago Bino Maggiore and Lago Bino Minore.

The term "bino" is likely derived from the Latin "binus," meaning double, as this lake is divided into two bodies of water.

== Lake Bino Maggiore ==
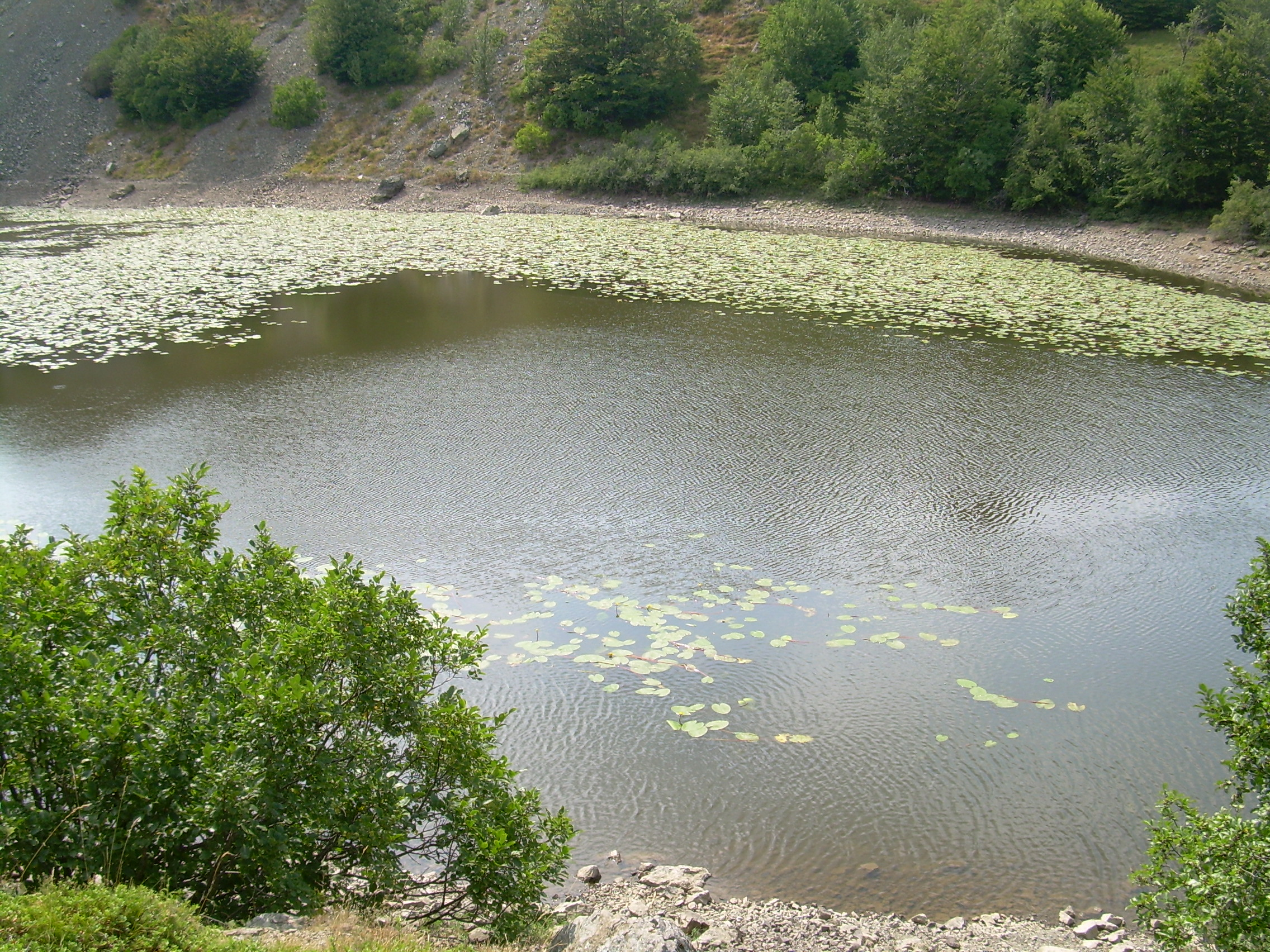
Lago Bino Maggiore

The Lake Bino Maggiore was formed due to a glacier descending from Monte Ragola. This glacier created an elongated basin that filled with water after its retreat, forming a lake. A more resistant rock ridge emerged in this lake, dividing the southern sector into two branches. The southwest branch was later separated from the lake by a landslide, forming a small separate body of water, Lago Bino Minore.

Currently, Lago Bino Maggiore covers an area of approximately 12,000 m^{2} (although its water level is highly variable) and has a maximum depth of about 3.5 m. The inflow comes from the overlying Pramollo peat bog and enters the lake at the end of the southeast branch. There is no true outflow: the water filters through the ground and collects lower down in the Rio del Lago Bino, a tributary of the stream Lardana, itself a tributary of the Nure.

Part of the lake's surface is covered with yellow water lilies (Nuphar lutea). The lake is home to trout and carp, and there are also specimens of grass snake. The shores are populated by frogs.

== Lake Bino Minore ==
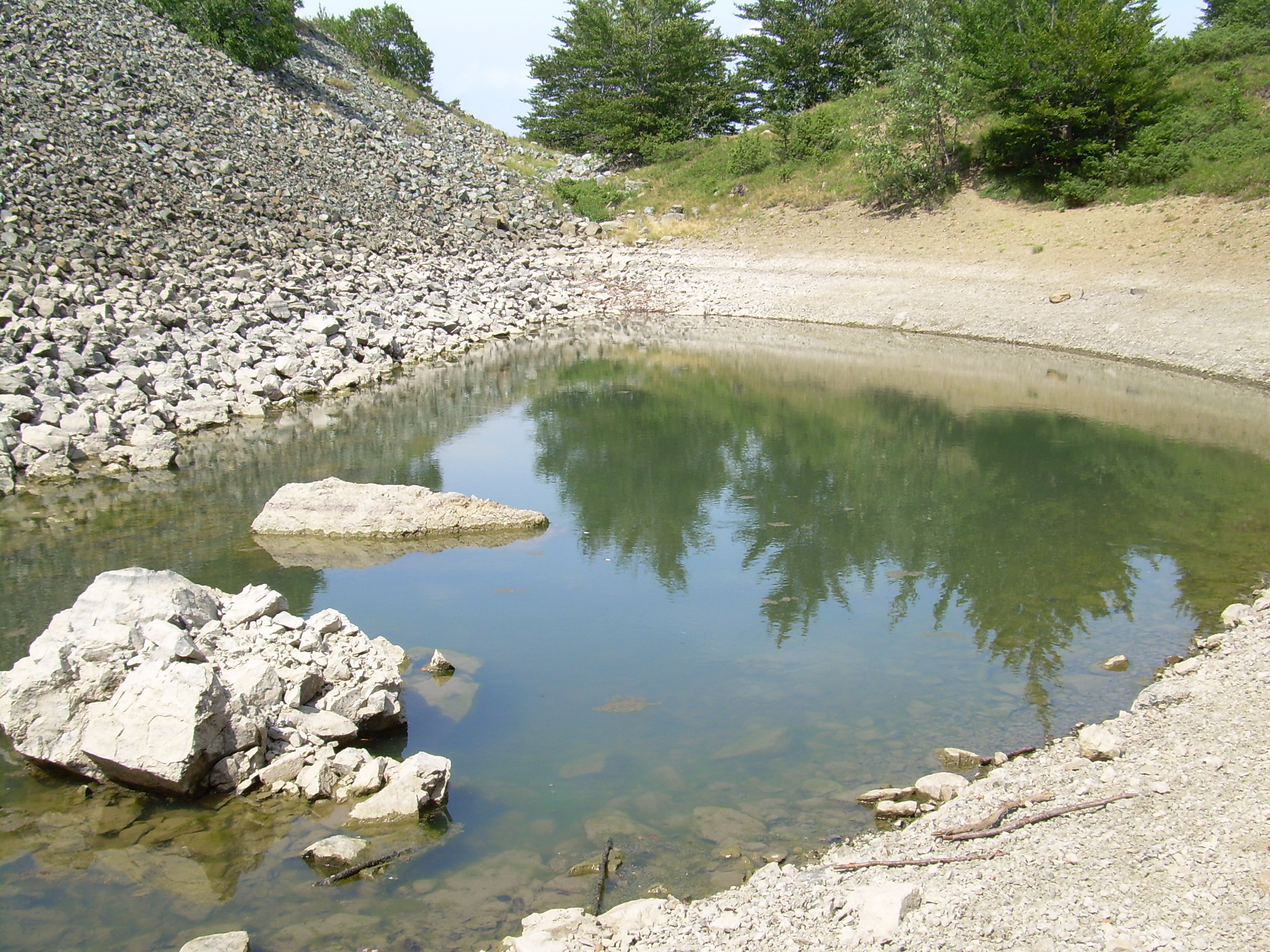
Lago Bino Minore

The Lake Bino Minore is the remnant of the southwest branch of the original Lago Bino, separated from it by a landslide. It covers about 400 m^{2} and reaches a maximum depth of 2.8 m. The small lake receives water from a tiny seasonal stream, and its surface varies depending on the seasons. The water then filters through the ground, feeding Lago Bino Maggiore.

The lakebed is stony, due to a large scree on one of the basin's slopes, which is slowly sliding into the water.

== Access trails ==
To reach Lago Bino, one can start from the nearby Lake Moo, following the numbered trail 021. Another trail, numbered 033, starts from the village of Cassimoreno, a hamlet of Ferriere, passing by the Cascata dell'Aquila, accessible by branching off from the provincial road 654R at Bosconure. Alternatively, one can take the road from the Ferriere hamlet of Pertuso, which ascends to the plateau of Prato Grande, and continue following the red trail marker (indicated as MP on maps).

== See also ==
- Val Nure
- Ferriere
- Ligurian Apennines

== Bibliography ==
- Bellavere, C.; Moroni, A. (2001). Laghi e pozze del Versante Nord dell'Appennino Settentrionale [Lakes and Ponds of the Northern Slope of the Northern Apennines] (in Italian). Parma.
- Brian, A. (1909). "Il Monte Ragola e i suoi laghi" [The Monte Ragola and its lakes]. Rivista del CAI (in Italian) (28).
- Ferrando, D. (2006). Laghi di Liguria e "dintorni" [Lakes of Liguria and "Surroundings"] (in Italian). Imperia: Grafiche Amadeo.
- Carlevero, G. Sentieri piacentini - vol. I [Piacenza Trails - vol. I] (in Italian). Piacenza: Editoriale Libertà.
- "Page on Lago Bino on the Val Lardana website". Archived from the original on October 19, 2009.
- "Route to Lago Bino via Cascata dell'Aquila". Archived from the original on December 17, 2014.

=== Cartography ===
- Hiking map Appennino Piacentino 2 - Val Trebbia e Val Nure, Infocartografica SCN and CAI Piacenza, scale 1:25,000, 2021 edition
