= Castell'Arquato =

- Comune
- Comune di Castell'Arquato
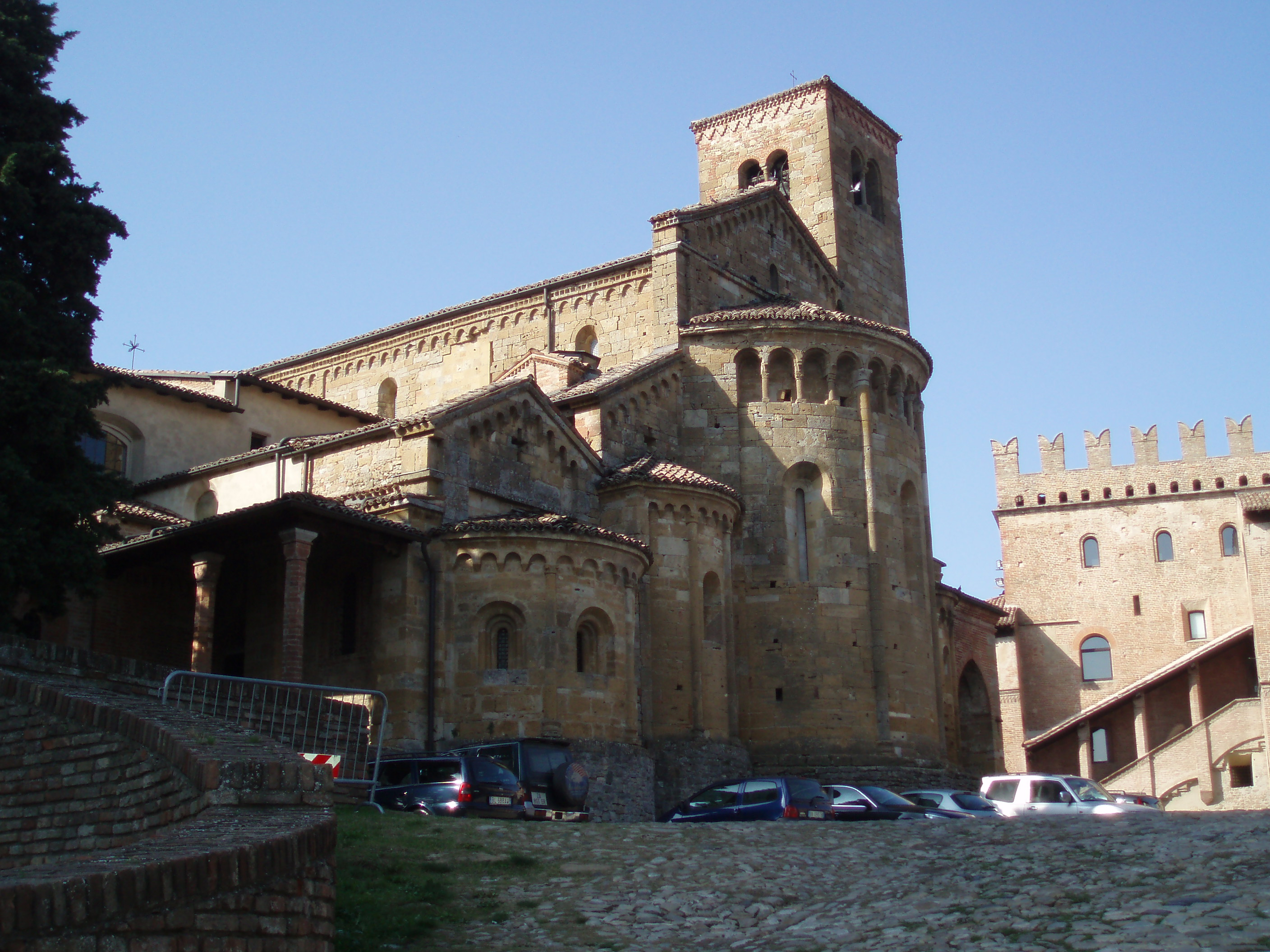
- Collegiata church.

- Coat of arms

- Location within Italy Location within Emilia-Romagna
- Coordinates: 44°51′N 9°52′E
- Country: Italy
- Region: Emilia-Romagna
- Province: Piacenza (PC)
- Frazioni: Bacedasco Alto, Doppi, Pallastrelli, Sant'Antonio, San Lorenzo, Vigolo Marchese

Government
  - Mayor: Ivano Rocchetta

Area
  - Total: 52 km^{2} (20 sq mi)
- Elevation: 224 m (735 ft)

Population (30 June 2017)
  - Total: 4,659
  - Density: 90/km^{2} (230/sq mi)
- Demonym: Arquatese
- Time zone: UTC+1 (CET)
  - Summer (DST): UTC+2 (CEST)
- Postal code: 29014
- Dialing code: 0523
- Website: Official website

Castell'Arquato (Italian pronunciation: [kaˌstɛllarˈkwaːto]; Piacentino: Castél Arquä or Castél Arcuà) is an Italian town located on the first hills of Val D’Arda in the province of Piacenza, in Emilia-Romagna, approximately 30 kilometres (19 mi) from Piacenza and 35 kilometres (22 mi) from Parma. Places nearby include Bacedasco, Vigolo Marchese, Fiorenzuola d'Arda, Lugagnano Val d'Arda, and Vernasca. It is one of I Borghi più belli d'Italia ("The most beautiful villages of Italy").

A medieval town of traditional structure which has maintained its appearance as it was in the early 10th century, the Old Town of Castell'Arquato is a high rock which in other times was strategically important for dominating the valley, now surrounded by the village. Its picturesque medieval features have led to the burg's appearances in movies such as Ladyhawke.

Opera librettist Luigi Illica, known for his long collaboration with composer Giacomo Puccini, but also with Alfredo Catalani and Umberto Giordano and author of the libretti of such operas as Tosca, La bohème, Madama Butterfly, La Wally and Andrea Chénier, was born in the borough in 1857 and is here buried.

Castell'Arquato is also in the area of the Colli Piacentini (Piacenza Hills), an important area for wine production. The most important wines produced in the Colli Piacentini are Gutturnio, Bonarda, Ortrugo, Malvasia, and Monterosso Val d'Arda.

The recent film Juliet and Romeo was filmed here. https://youtu.be/1SgikfMKAb8?si=wqJVa8HflGQEsCzH

== History ==
The origins of Castell'Arquato are uncertain. It is believed that it originated as a Roman military settlement (castrum). During the Roman Imperial Era it developed into a small rural town, thanks to its position commanding the routes from Piacenza and Parma toward the Ligurian Sea (Liguria is at the end of the Piacenza valley).

The first historical news concerning Castell’Arquato (known as la Pieve) appear in the 8th century. Castell'Arquato seems to have been constructed by a "noble and powerful lord named Magnus". Magnus built the squared based castle and a church "In honor Mater Dei" (756–758). At that time Castell’Arquato had a military (Castrum) and an agricultural organisation (Curtis), the Justice Administration (Curia) and the Religious Administration (Pieve).

Before dying in 789 Magnus gave the town, the church of Santa Maria and its goods to the bishop of Piacenza, and Castell’Arquato acquired an important freedom as a Pieve (pleban church).

The Bishop had the right of direct taxation (fodro) throughout the territory of Castell'Arquato on all the men, nobiles, burgenses, lords with houses and lands in the area and on the clerics of Santa Maria.

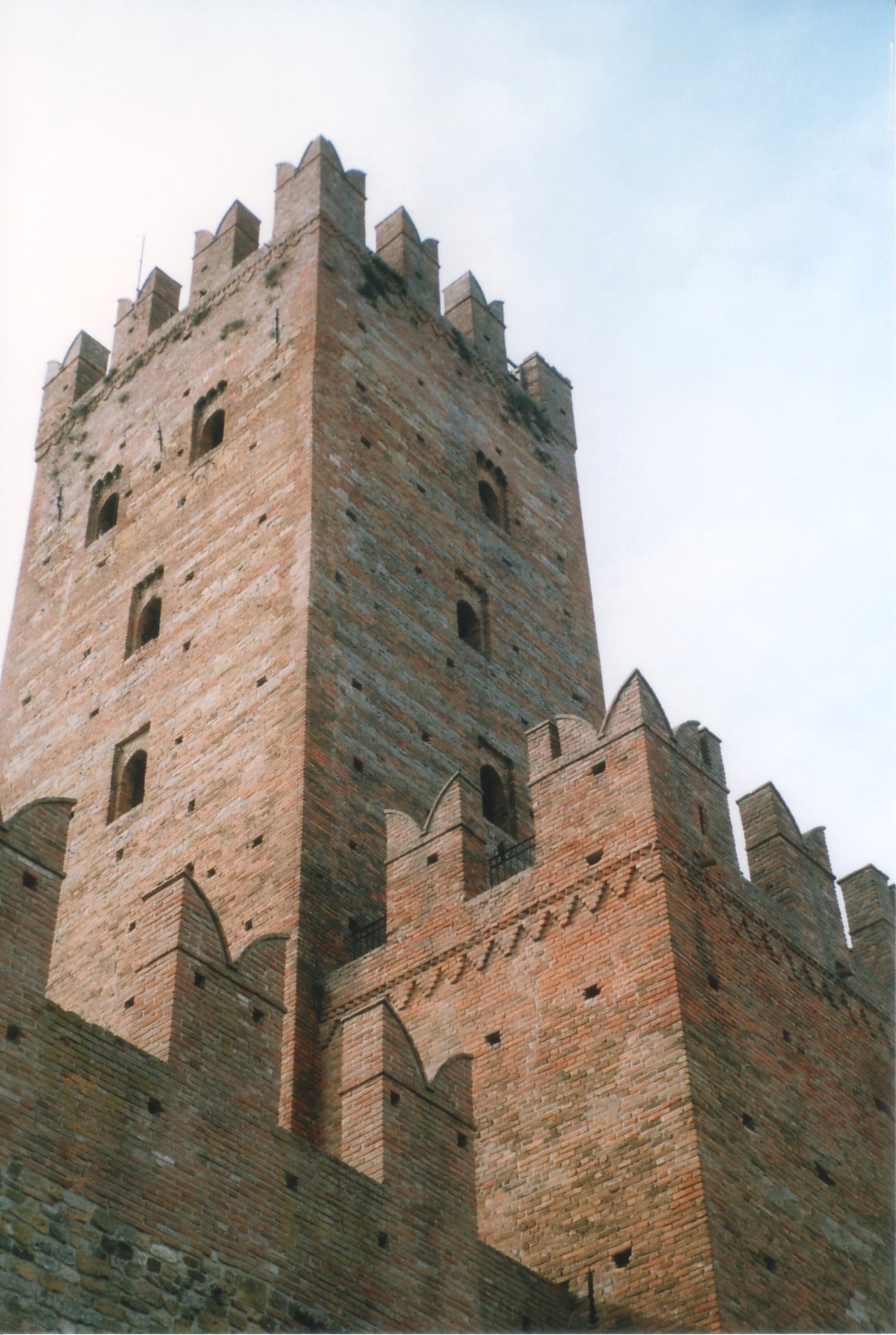
The tower of the Visconti Castle

From 1204 to 1207 the Bishop of Piacenza Grimerio chose Castell’Arquato as his home. The hamlet became even more independent from Piacenza. The grant of an autonomous government became official in the summer of 1220.

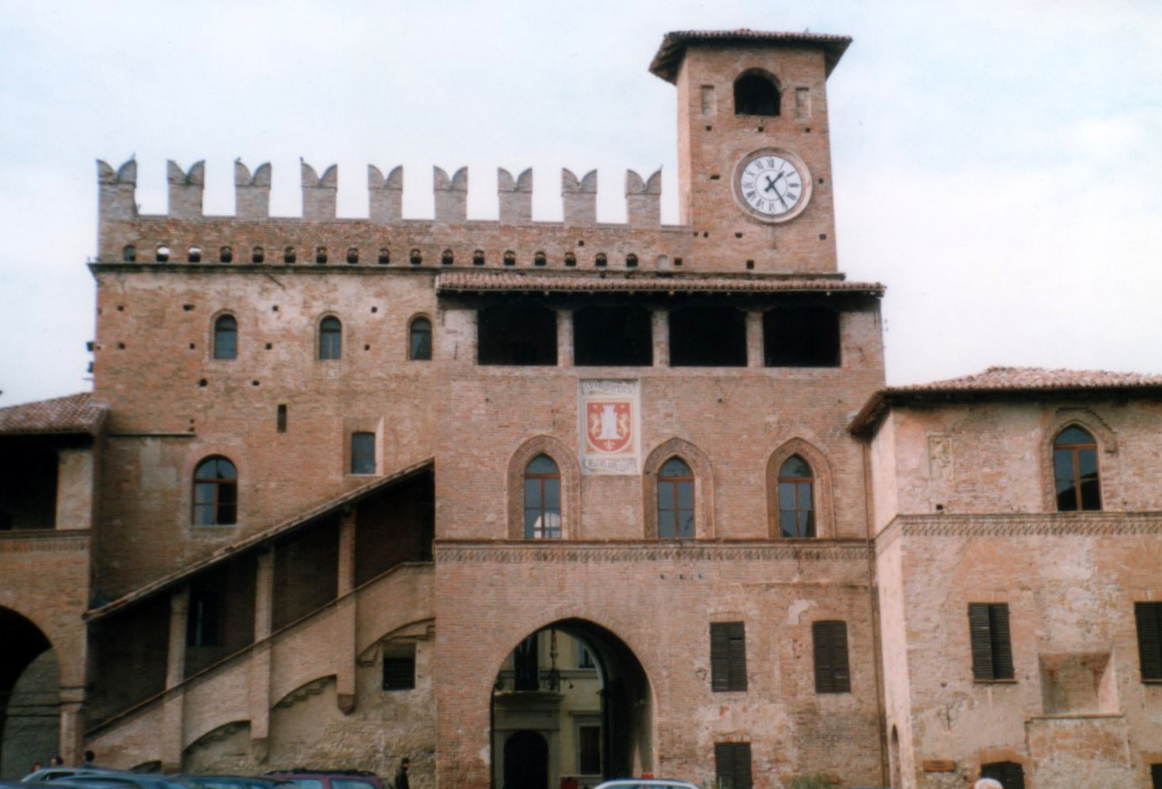
Podestà Palace.

The first document in the historical archive of Castell'Arquato is from 10 August 1220 when the Bishop Vicedomio gave his land in the burg and the territory in Emphyteusis (a form of fiefdom) to the "burg and to the homines" of Castell’Arquato for 700 piacentian lire. For 200 lire and a small annual fee he gives also "in perpetual investiture all jurisdictions, honors and tithes" of Castell’Arquato, Lusurasco, San Lorenzo and Vernasca.

Castell’Arquato was at the time ruled by a podestà chosen by the commune of Piacenza from among the most renowned members of the Piacenza's families, serving for a term of three years. The podestà had civil, political and judicial functions.

The podestà's rule ended in 1290 when Alberto Scotti, backed by the Guelph faction, the merchant class and the artisanal corporations, became lord of Piacenza. Castell’Arquato also became a seigniory on its own right. Alberto Scotti allied himself to the Visconti family and extended his dominion to the territory of Piacenza, while entrusting Castell’Arquato to the podestà Tedesio de' Spectinis. The alliance with the Visconti ended in 1302 when the son of Matteo Visconti, Galeazzo I Visconti, married Beatrice d'Este and shifted the weight of the alliances, starting a period of conflict that brought the Scotti to Milan.

Under the Scotti dominion, Castell’Arquato acquired political prestige and many of the buildings that can be still be seen today, like the Palazzo del Podestà (Podestà's Palace) and the Palazzo di Giustizia (Court of Justice), nucleus of what is today the Palazzo del Duca (Ducal Palace).

In 1304 Alberto Scotti was banished from Castell’Arquato by the city of Piacenza, but came back three years later. After the arrival of German emperor Henry VII in 1310, Alberto Scotti ruled the village until 1316 when Galeazzo I Visconti besieged Castell’Arquato, which yielded after one year. Galeazzo Visconti allowed the town "special rights": the ability to juridically emancipate itself from Piacenza and to write laws of its own, the basis of the 15th century statutes.

In 1324 Castell’Arquato was given to the municipality of Piacenza, itself under the dominion of the Church, which governed the burg for twelve years. Piacenza went back to the Visconti in 1336 with Azzone Visconti, who favored the burg's autonomy from Piacenza, appointing a trusted podestà, Galvagno de' Comini, and facilitating the fortification of this strategically and militarily important area. He died at the age of 37 years. His successor, Luchino Visconti was responsible for the construction of the Rocca (starting in 1342), promoted by the municipality of Piacenza.

In 1403 Gian Galeazzo Visconti gave Borromeo de' Borromei and his descendants feudal powers over Castell’Arquato, with the related fiscal revenues. Threatened by the powerful family of the Arcilli from Firenzuola, they gave back their rights to the people of Arquato, who gave them to Filippo Maria Visconti, Duke of Milan. From 1416 to 1470 the town was called Castel Visconti.

In 1438 Filippo Maria Visconti offered the fief to the condottiero Niccolò Piccinino, under whose government the Municipal Statutes were promulgated, the Statuta et Decreta Terrae Castri Arquati. After his death the village went to his sons Francesco and Jacopo. After Filippo Maria Visconti's death, his son-in-law Francesco I Sforza was in 1447 also declared lord of Piacenza and its area.

In 1541 Pope Paul III declared the independence of the village, having already initiated the process in 1538. He also visited the Castell'Arquato in the spring of 1543 when he was acclaimed by the population, grateful for the independence from Piacenza also meant economical relief.

The rule by the Sforzas went on until 1707, when the territory of Castell'Arquato became part of the Duchy of Parma and Piacenza under the Farnese and later the House of Bourbon, until its annexation to Italy in 1860.

The current coat of arms reflects these changes, featuring the castle alongside the symbols of Piacenza (red castra of Sant'Antonino), the Farnese (golden fleur de lis); the Scotti (6-pointed gold stars) and the Sforza (golden lions).

== Main sights ==
- Rocca Viscontea (Visconti castle). Founded over pre-existing edifice, it was the seat of the Visconti garrison and has a quadrangular plan with four square towers at the vertexes, a mastio (keep) and a ditch with two entrances. The Rocca is today home to the Medieval Museum
- Collegiata church of St Mary, dating to the late 8th century, when it was a baptismal pieve. It was however, completely rebuilt after an earthquake in 1117. Notable is the Romanesque "Paradise Portico" on the left side, dating to the late 14th century, the four apses and the late 13th century cloister. The interior has sculpted capitals and sculptures from the 12th century, and frescoes.
- Palazzo del Podestà
- Torrione Farnese (Farnese Tower)
- Porta di Sasso (Sasso Gate)
- Baptistery of San Giovanni, at Vigolo Marchese
- S. Spirito Hospital (now housing a museum)
- Palazzo del Duca (Ducal Palace), built in 1292 by Alberto Scoto. It is connected to the Torrione by a tunnel.
- Church of San Giacomo
- Vernasca Silver Flag (Annual vintage motorsport event). Scheduled for 16–18 June 2017 and organized by Club Piacentino Automotoveicoli d'Epoca.

== Culture ==
The castle's archive houses a collection of ancient music (from c. 16th century). It was partly published by the American Institute of Musicology. In those time it means for harpsichord or organ. The edition is called CEKM (Corpus of Early Keyboard music).

From this collection a keyboard dance of the renaissance called "Al Milanese" with regal sound:

"Al Milanese" 781 Kb

== Notable residents ==
- Isa Stoppi (1941–2020), Italian model
