= Val Nure =

Valley in Italy

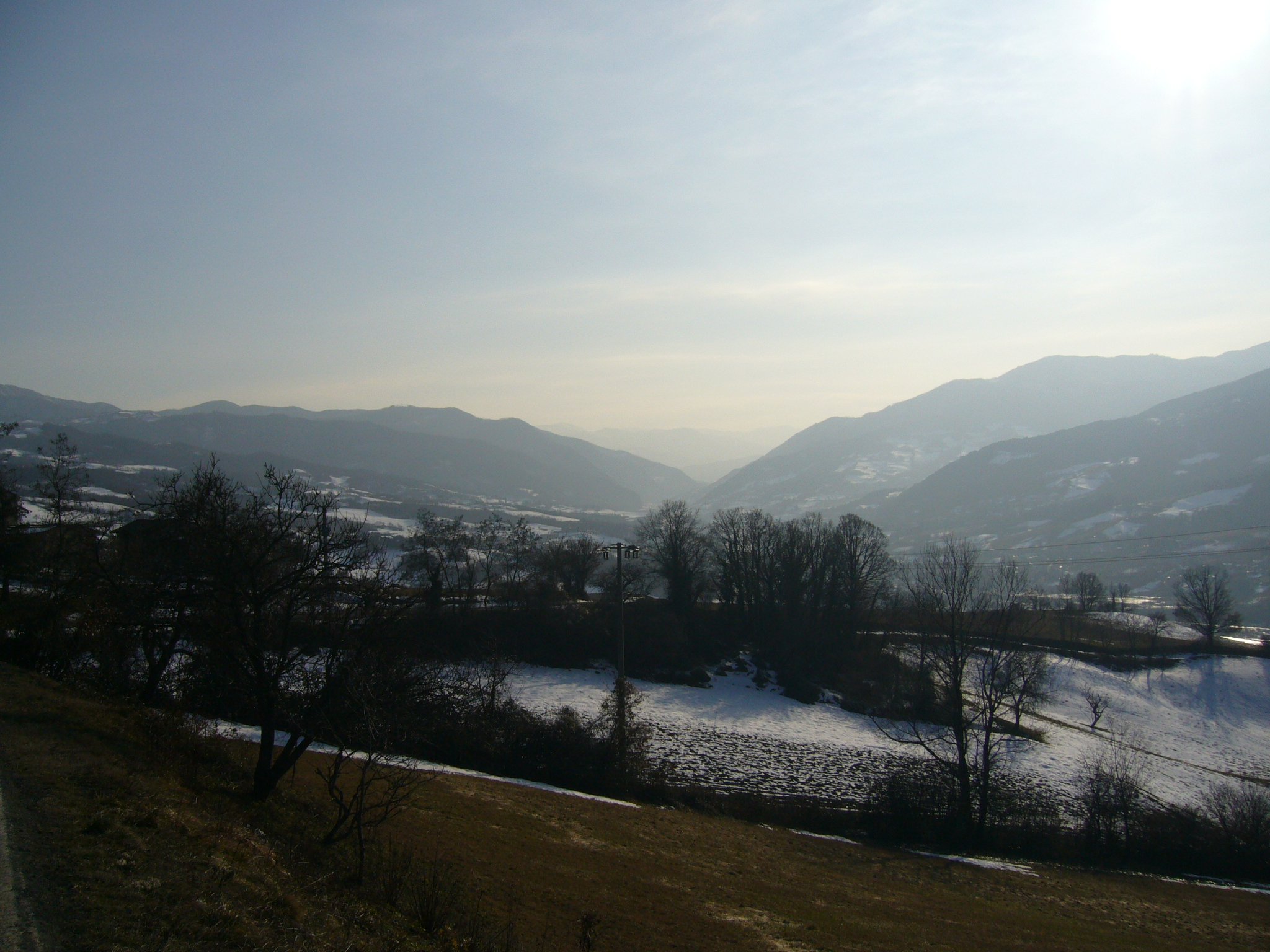
- View of the Val Nure from above Bettola

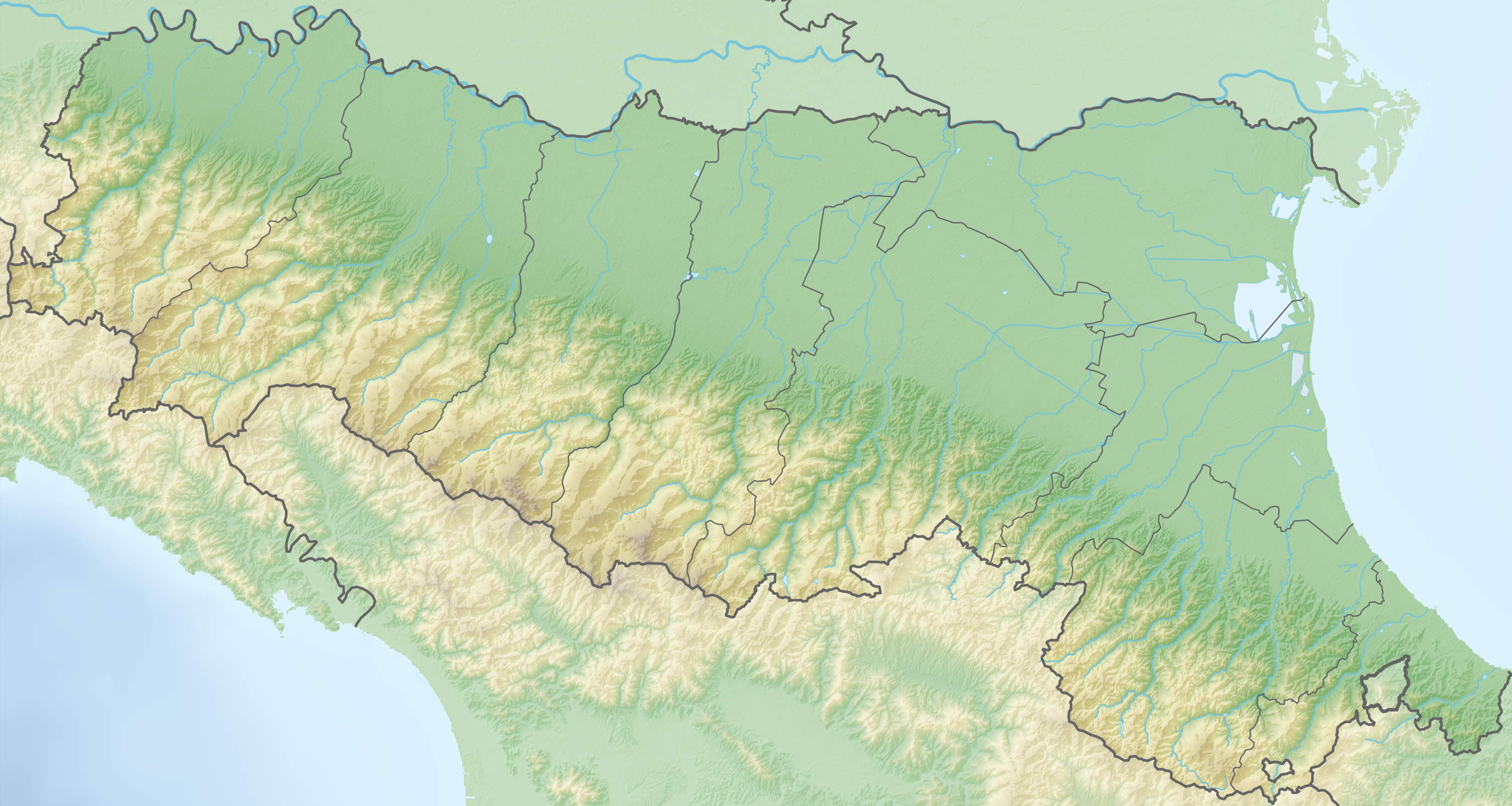
- Location within Emilia-Romagna
- Length: 75 km (47 mi)

Geography
- Location: Comuni of Ferriere, Farini, Bettola, Ponte dell'Olio, Vigolzone, San Giorgio Piacentino, Podenzano, Pontenure
- Coordinates: 44°42′N 9°34′E
- Rivers: Nure
- Interactive map of Val Nure

The Val Nure is the valley of the Nure river, a tributary of the Po. The valley lies almost entirely in the Province of Piacenza, in the Emilia-Romagna region of Italy. It forms part of the Comunità Montana Valli del Nure e dell'Arda.

== Geography ==
The Val Nure is approximately 75 kilometres (47 miles) long, and runs from south-west to north-east. The source of the Nure is at the Lago Nero. It runs into the Po about 10 km (6 mi) east of Piacenza, close to Roncarolo, a frazione of the comune of Caorso. The valley lies between the Val d'Arda to the east, the Valle del Ceno to the south-east, the Val d'Aveto to the south-west and the Val Trebbia to the west.

The Val Nure lies in the Colli Piacentini, or "hills of Piacenza", wine-growing region. Colli Piacentini Valnure is a Denominazione di Origine Controllata white wine made in the comuni of Ponte dell'Olio, San Giorgio Piacentino and Vigolzone from Malvasia di Candia aromatica, Ortrugo and Trebbiano Romagnolo grape varieties.

== History ==
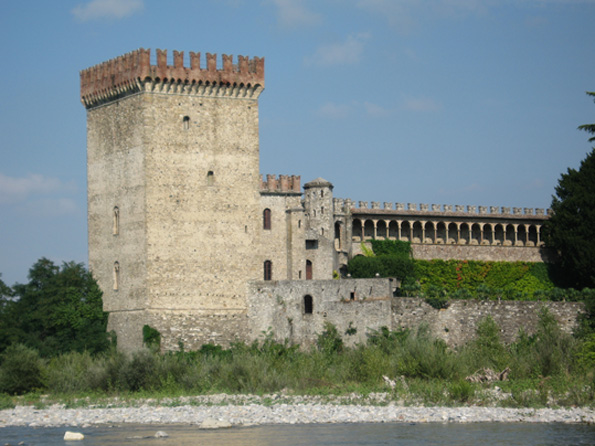
The Castello di Riva at Ponte dell'Olio, seen from the Nure river

In feudal times control of the valley was disputed between the Anguissola, Camia, Malaspina and Nicelli families. In the early 17th century it passed into the hands of Ottavio Farnese. There are some eighty castles and fortifications in the valley, among them the Castello di Riva at Ponte dell'Olio, and the castles of Altoè, of Grazzano Visconti, of Paderna, of Podenzano and of Vigolzone.

== International relations ==
=== Twin towns – Sister cities ===
Val Nure is twinned with:

- Nogent-sur-Marne, France
