= Collegiata of Castell'Arquata =

Roman Catholic church in Emilia-Romagna, Italy

Coordinates: 44.8509°N 9.8670°E

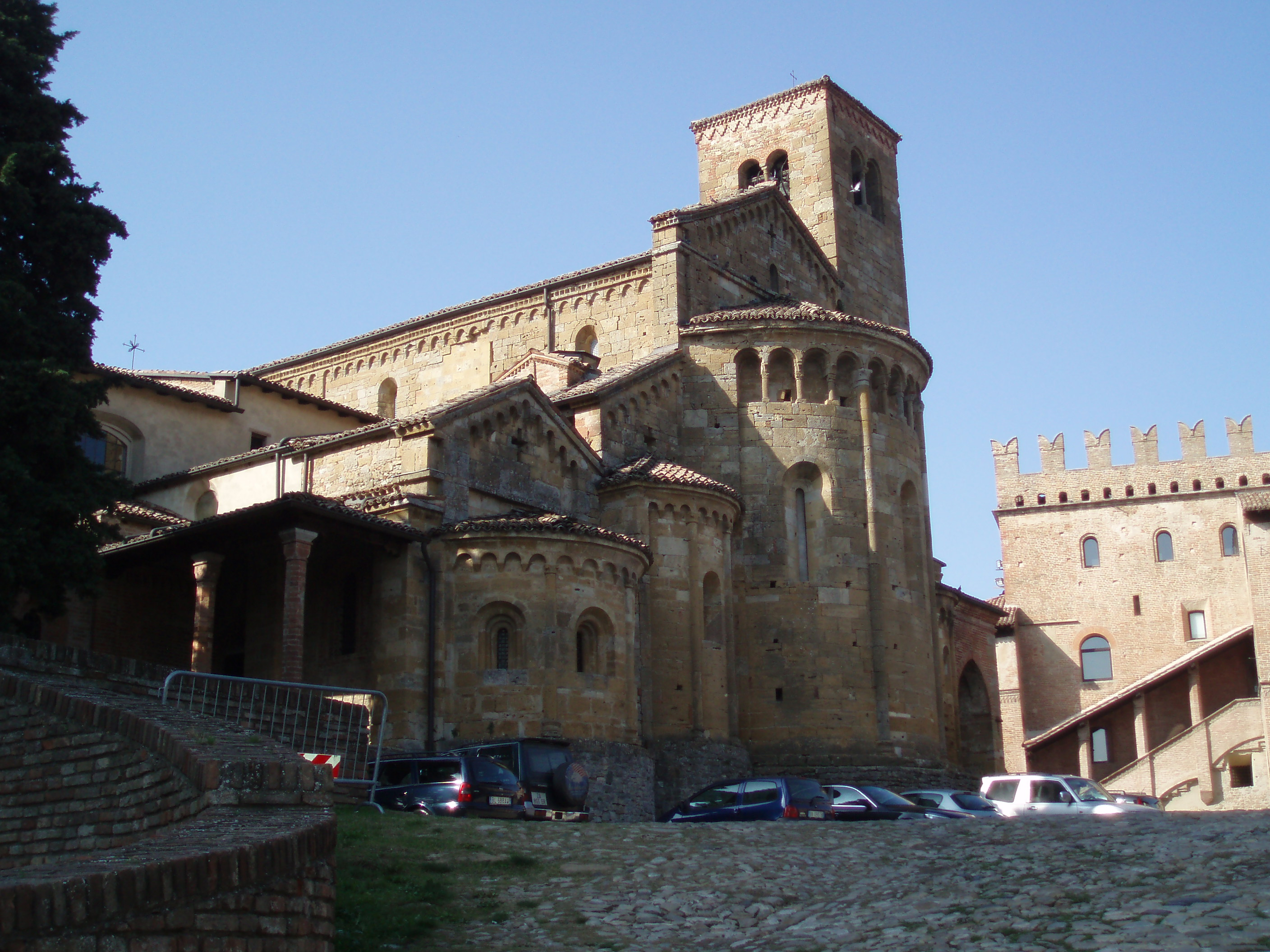
Collegiata church

The Collegiata di Castell'Arquato, also known as the Collegiata di Santa Maria, is a Romanesque-style, Roman Catholic church located in the Castell'Arquato, province of Piacenza, in Emilia-Romagna, Italy.

== History and description ==
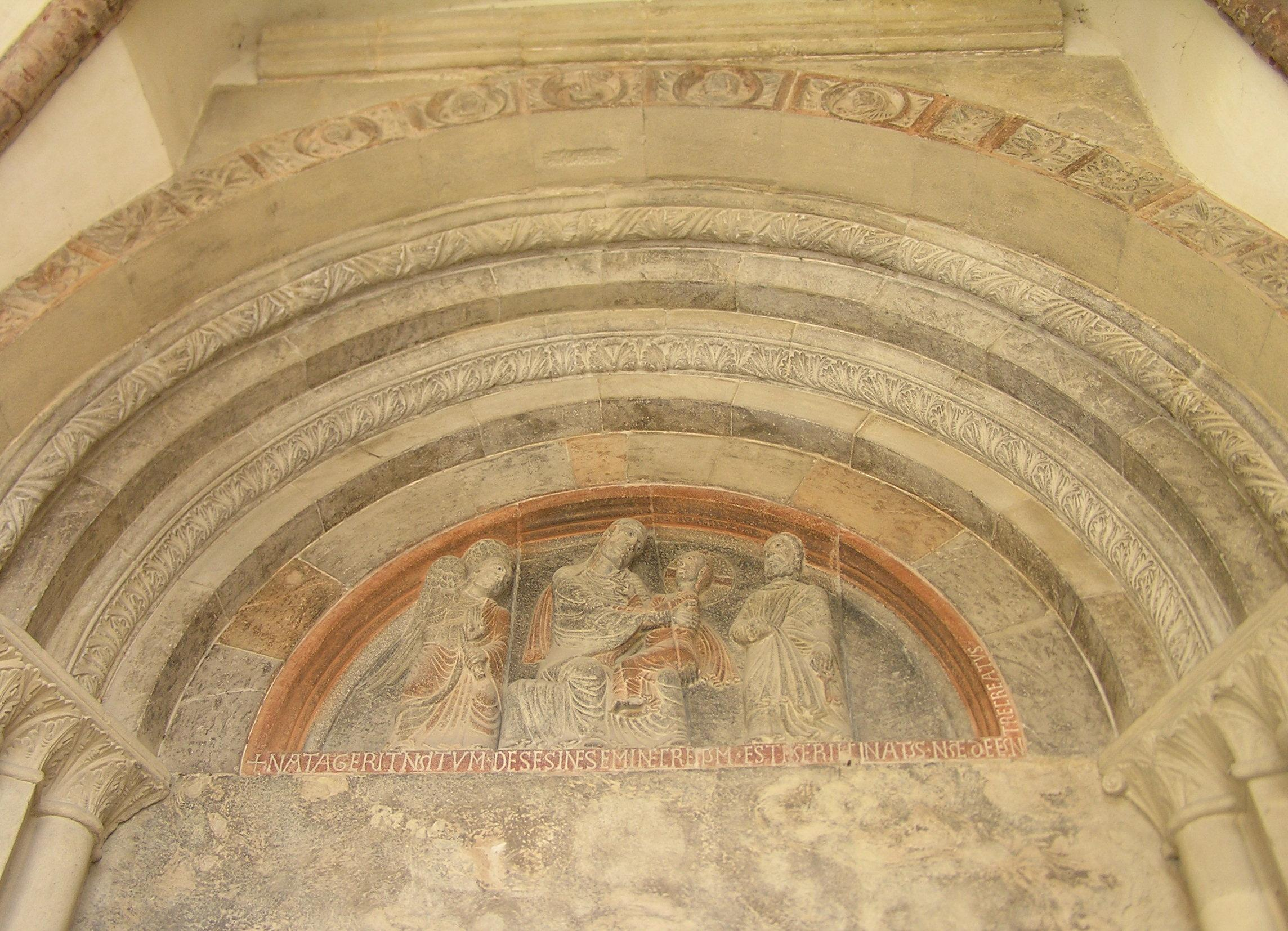
Portal of Paradise with Romanesque sculpture

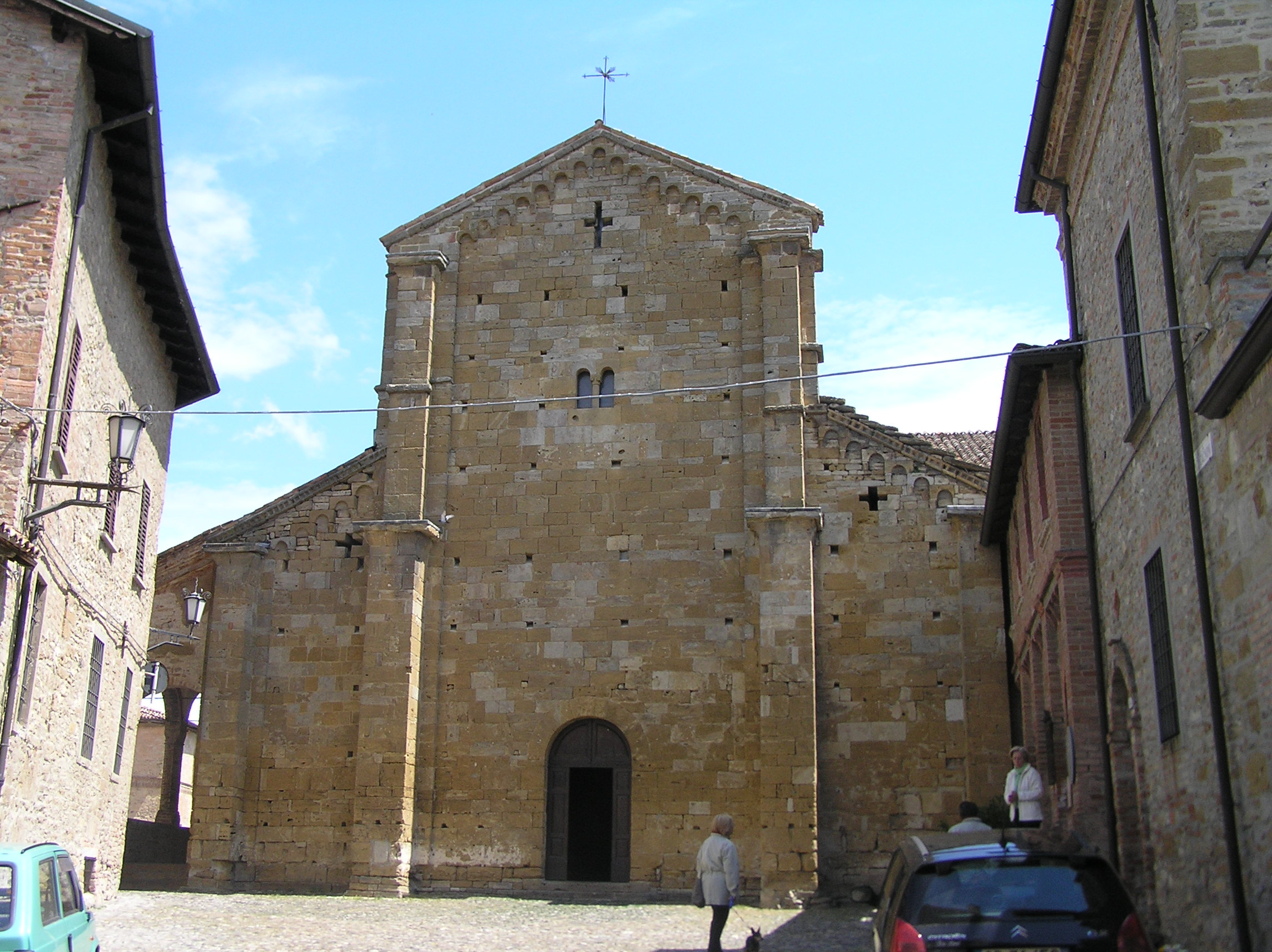
Facade of church

Documents allege a church existed at the site by 756. Of that building, only the baptismal font seems to have survived. The earthquake of 1117 prompted a major reconstruction, and a new building consecrated in 1122. The Portal of Paradise retains some of the Romanesque sculptural elements, with a relief depicting Madonna and Child with St Peter and Angels. The portico on the left of the church with octagonal columns, church cloister, and bell-tower, date to the 15th century. The church facade was also completed in the 15th century. The Palazzo Pretorio adjacent to the church was built in 1293. Further reconstructions and additions occurred in 18th and 19th centuries.

In 1899, the 15th-century frescoes were discovered in the Chapel of Santa Caterina. A few decades later, the 8th-century baptismal immersion font came to light. The interior walls of this chapel have frescoes by unknown Tuscan painters, depicting the Passion of Christ, and the Death and Glory of the Virgin.

The chapel of St Joseph, built in 1630 after the ebbing of the plague, was decorated by frescoes by Giacomo Guidotti.
