= Lago Nero (Piacenza) =

Lake in the Province of Piacenza, Emilia-Romagna, Italy

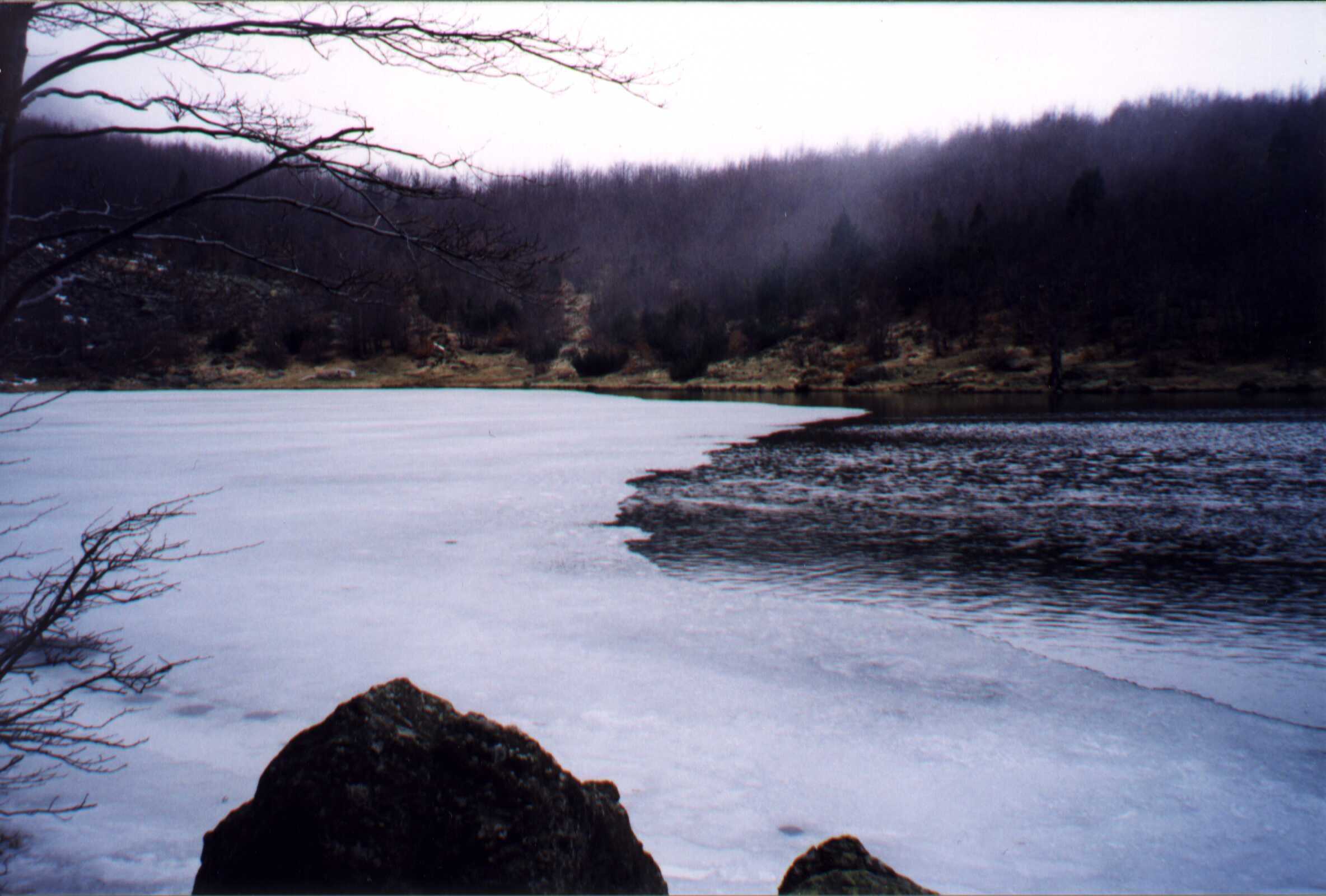

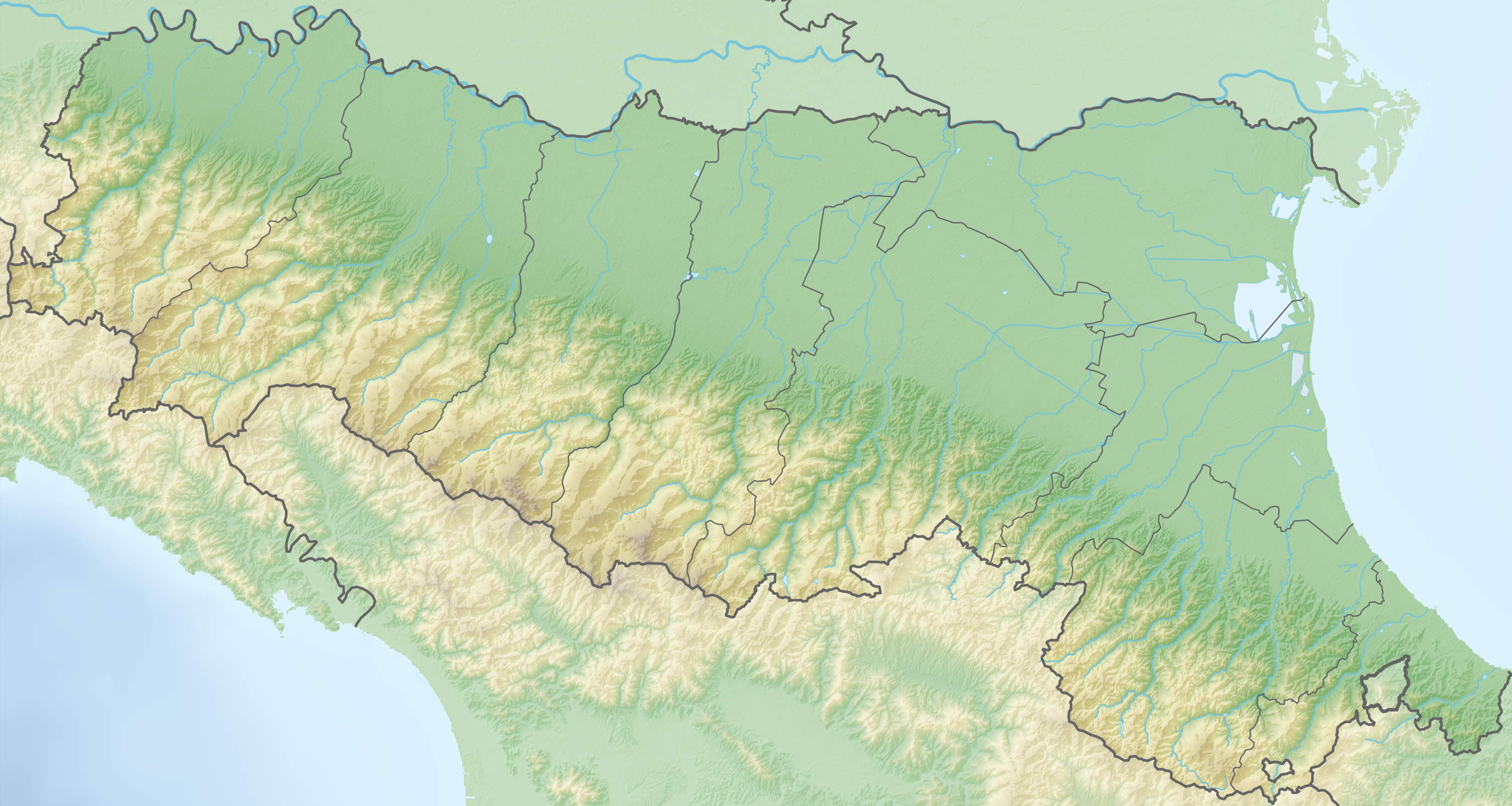
- Location within Emilia-Romagna
- Location: Province of Piacenza, Emilia-Romagna
- Coordinates: 44°33′43″N 9°30′07″E
- Primary outflows: Nure
- Basin countries: Italy
- Surface elevation: 1,540 m (5,050 ft)

Lago Nero (Italian for "black lake") is a lake in the Comune of Ferriere, in the Province of Piacenza, Emilia-Romagna, Italy. Its surface is 1,540 feet above mean sea level.
