= Visconti Rocca (Castell'Arquato) =

Castle in northern Italy

- Rocca Viscontea di Castell'Arquato
- Castell’Arquato, Emilia-Romagna, Northern Italy
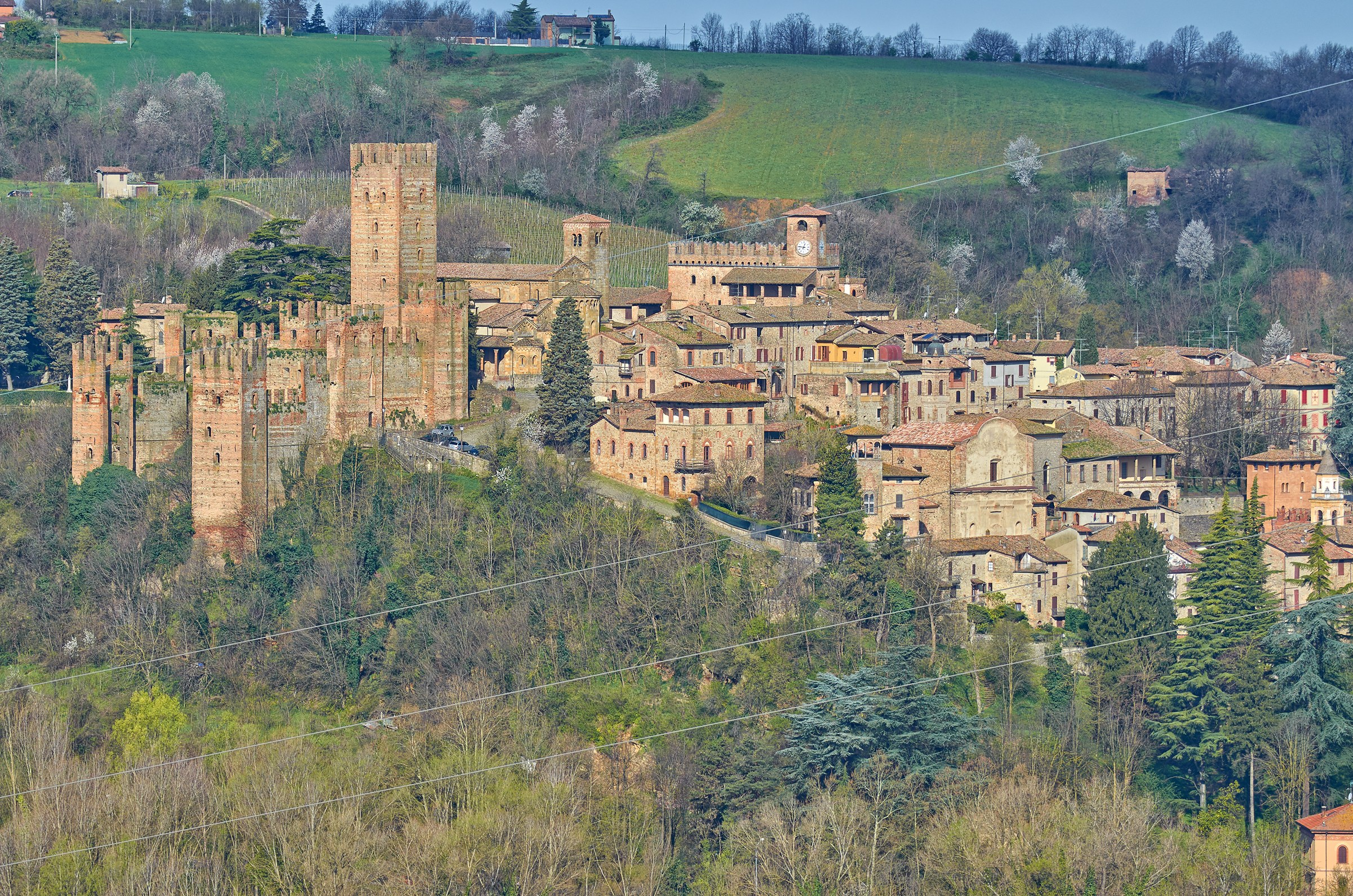
- View of Castell'Arquato with the Visconti Rocca on the left

Site information
- Type: Rocca
- Owner: Castell'Arquato municipality
- Open to the public: Yes
- Condition: Good

Location
- Coordinates: 44°51′01″N 9°52′03″E
- Height: 35 metres (115 ft) (main tower)

Site history
- Built: 14th century
- Built by: Luchino Visconti
- Materials: Bricks

The Visconti Rocca of Castell'Arquato is a Rocca in the medieval town of Castell'Arquato, Emilia Romagna, Northern Italy. It was erected on the site of a previous fortification by Luchino Visconti in the 14th century after his family acquired Castell'Arquato.

== History ==
A fortress probably existed in Castell'Arquato already in the 8th century as a belonging of the bishop of Piacenza. In the following centuries, its owner changed several times. It belonged to the imperial authority, the local Commune, and the Piacenza Commune. At the beginning of the 14th century, it was under the lordship of Alberto Scoto. In 1316, Galeazzo I Visconti took control of Piacenza's territory and, therefore, also of Castell'Arquato. He lost Piacenza in 1322, when, after the uprising promoted by Obizzo Landi and supported by the Church, Castell'Arquato was handed over again to the Piacenza Commune.

Later, the Visconti returned to Castell'Arquato with Azzone, who built the town walls. One of its doors towards the valley (the 'Porta di Sasso') still exists today. Luchino Visconti probably initiated the Rocca in 1342 and completed it in 1347.

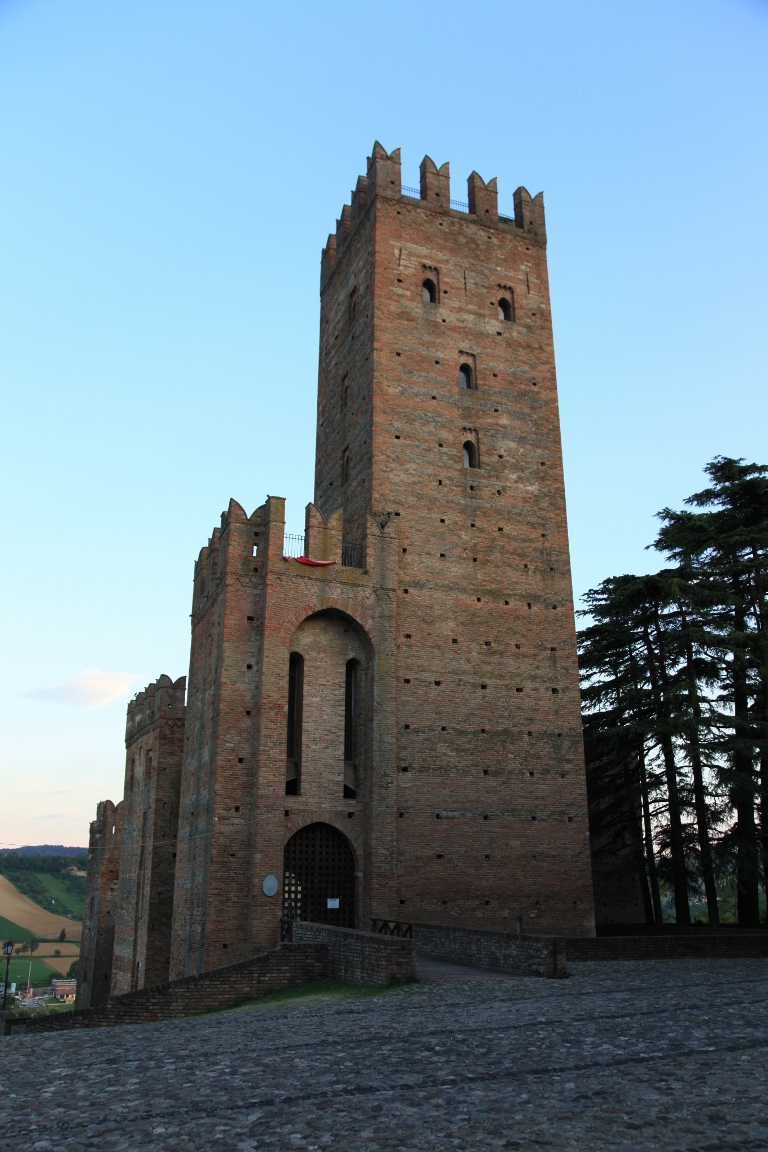
The main tower

== Description ==
The Rocca has an L-shape, a plan unique in the Piacenza area. It consists of two separate parts. A rectangular is on the lower level of the steeply sloping ground. A smaller and higher enclosure is placed perpendicular to the first.

The two enclosures have quadrangular towers at each corner, oriented along the four cardinal points. The keep, 35 metres (115 ft) tall, is the only tower completed with four walls and interior rooms on its floors, while the others lack a wall on the side internal to the Rocca. The keep faces the Castell'Arquato civic square, surrounded on two different sides by the apses of the romanesque collegiate and the Palazzo del Podestà.

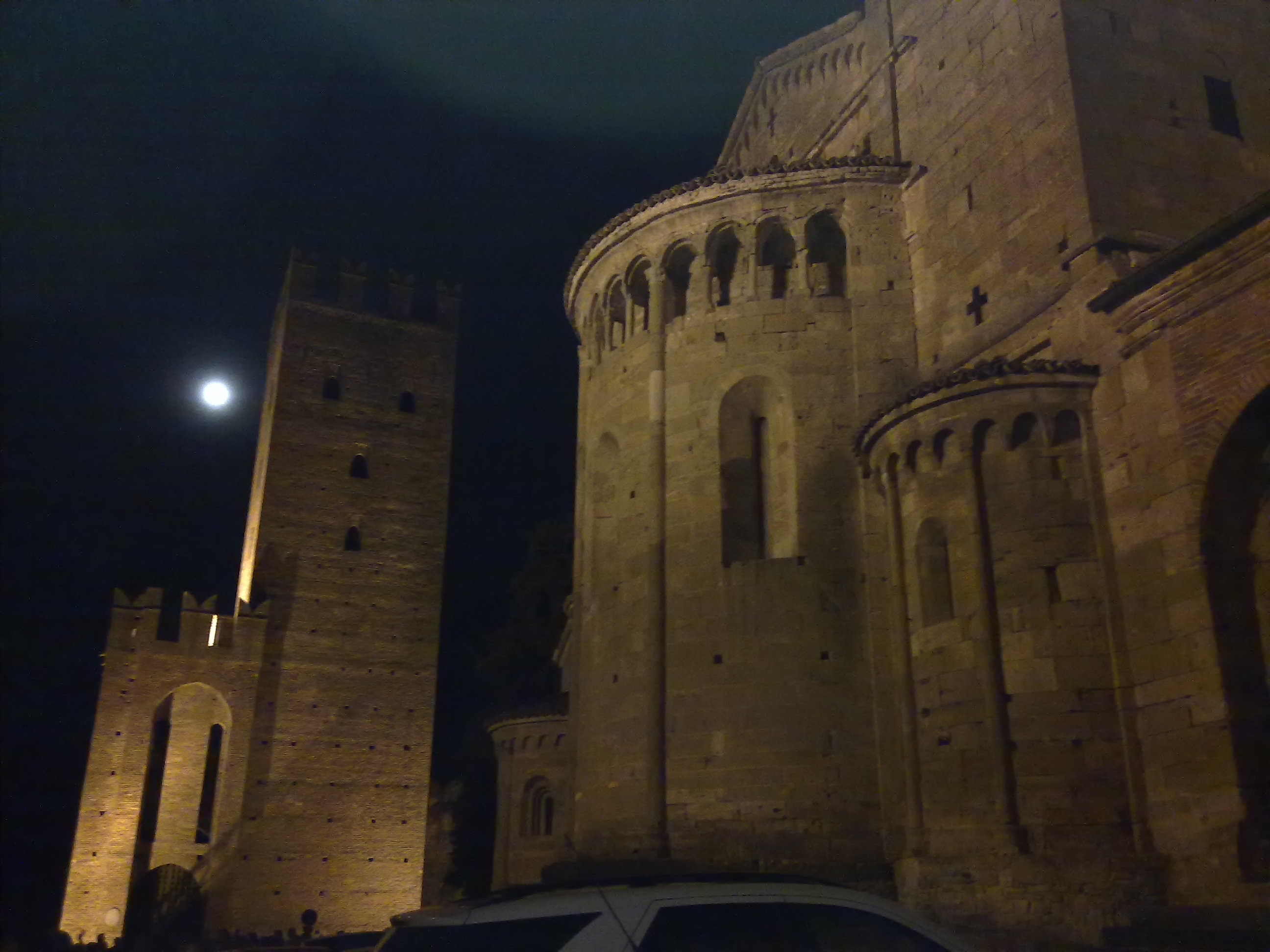
Night view of the main tower and the collegiate apses

== Sources ==
- IAT Ufficio Informazioni e Accoglienza Turistica (2017). Castell’Arquato. Guida alla visita (in Italian). Piacenza: Edizioni Tip. Le. Co. ISBN 9788886806817. OCLC 1046002180.
- Perogalli, Carlo (1972). Castelli e rocche di Emilia e Romagna (in Italian). Milan: Görlich Editore. ISBN 9788840256597. OCLC 964222739.
