= Ortrugo =

Variety of grape

Ortrugo is a white Italian wine grape variety that is grown in the Piacenza hills of the Emilia-Romagna region of north central Italy. Here the grape is often blended with Malvasia in the DOC white wines of the area. According to wine expert Oz Clarke, the grape has moderate acidity with high alcohol potential and often contributes a deep yellow color to the wine. In some regions the grape is used in slightly sparkling frizzante and fully sparkling spumante wines.

== DOC wines ==
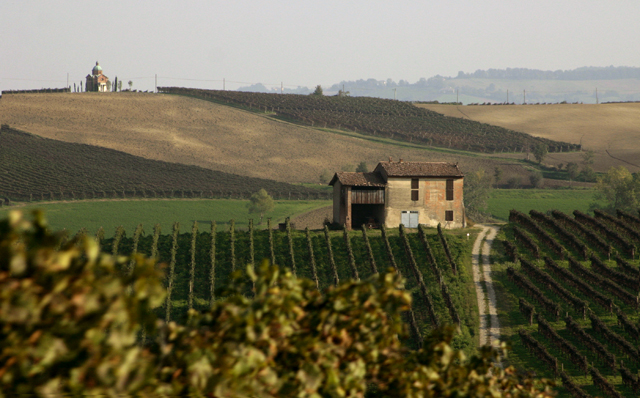
Ortrugo is widely grown throughout the Colli Piacentini region in Emilia-Romagna.

Ortrugo is a permitted variety in the Denominazione di origine controllata wines of the Colli Piacentini DOC covering more than 3,600 hectares (9,000 acres) in the hilly Piacenza region. Here the grape can be made a varietal wine providing it makes up at least 85% of the wine with other local white varieties permitted to fill in the remainder. Grapes destined for this DOC wine must be harvested to a yield no greater than 11 tonnes/hectare with the finished wine needing to attain a minimum alcohol level of at least 10.5% It can also account for 20-35% of the DOC white wine Monterosso Val d'Arda along with Trebbiano Romagnolo with Malvasia di Candia Aromatica accounting for 35-50% of the blend, Moscato Bianco filling in 10-30% and Bervedino and Sauvignon blanc permitted to be used up to a maximum of 20%. These grapes are limited to a harvest yield of 9 tonnes/ha with a minimum alcohol level of 11%.

Ortrugo is used in a similar way in the DOC Val Nure wine at 20-35% of the blend with Malvasia accounting for 30-50% of the blend, Trebbiano at 20-35% ad other local white grape varieties permitted up to a 15%. Like Monterosso Val d'Arda the grapes must be harvested to yields no greater than 9 tonnes/ha with the finished wine needing a minimum alcohol level of 11%. For Trebbiano Val Trebbia Ortrugo will represent 35-50% of the blend with Malvasia and Moscato accounting for 10-30%, Trebbiano and Sauvignon blanc filling in 15-30% and other local white grape varieties permitted up to a maximum of 15%. This wine can also be made in a sparkling Spumante style. Grapes are limited to yields of 10 tonnes/ha with a minimum alcohol level of 11%.

== Synonyms ==
Over the years Ortrugo has been known under a variety of synonyms including Altrughe, Altrugo, Altrugo de Rovescala, Altrugo de Rovalesca, Artrugo, Barbasina, Barbesina, Barbesino, Barbesino bianco, Barbsin agglomerato, Barbsin bianco, Ortrugo de Rovescala, Trebbiano di Tortona, Vernasino bianco and Vernesina.
