= Nero Lake (Valsesia) =

Lake in the Province of Vercelli, Piedmont, Italy

Lago Nero
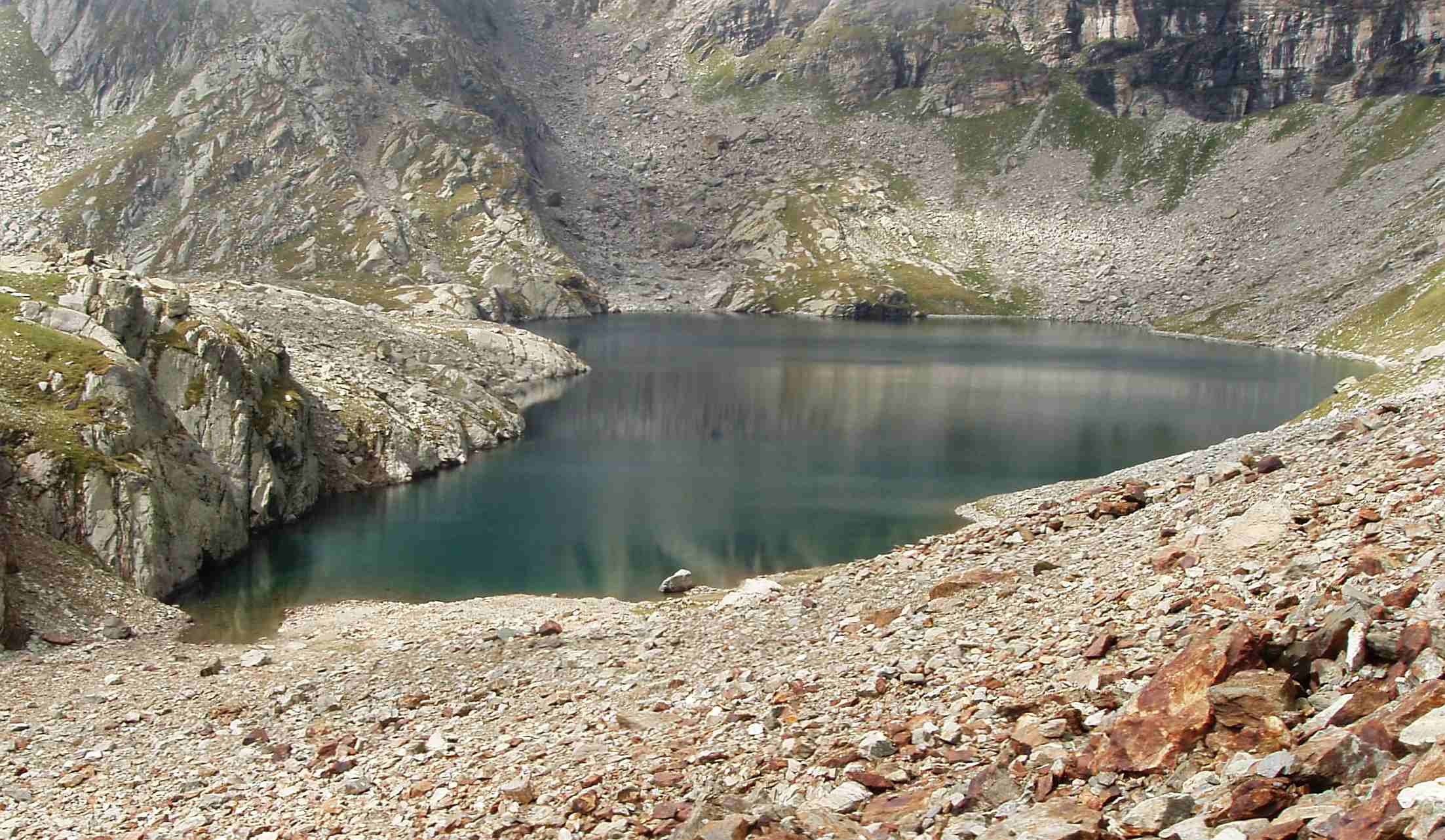

- Location within Piedmont
- Location: Province of Vercelli, Piedmont
- Coordinates: 45°48′59″N 7°52′25″E
- Primary outflows: torrente Rissuolo
- Basin countries: Italy
- Surface elevation: 2,667 m (8,750 ft)

Nero Lake is a lake in the Province of Vercelli, Piedmont, Italy. The lake has an elevation of 2,667 metres (8,750 ft).
