= Lago Nero (Bergamo) =

Lake in the Province of Bergamo, Lombardy, Italy

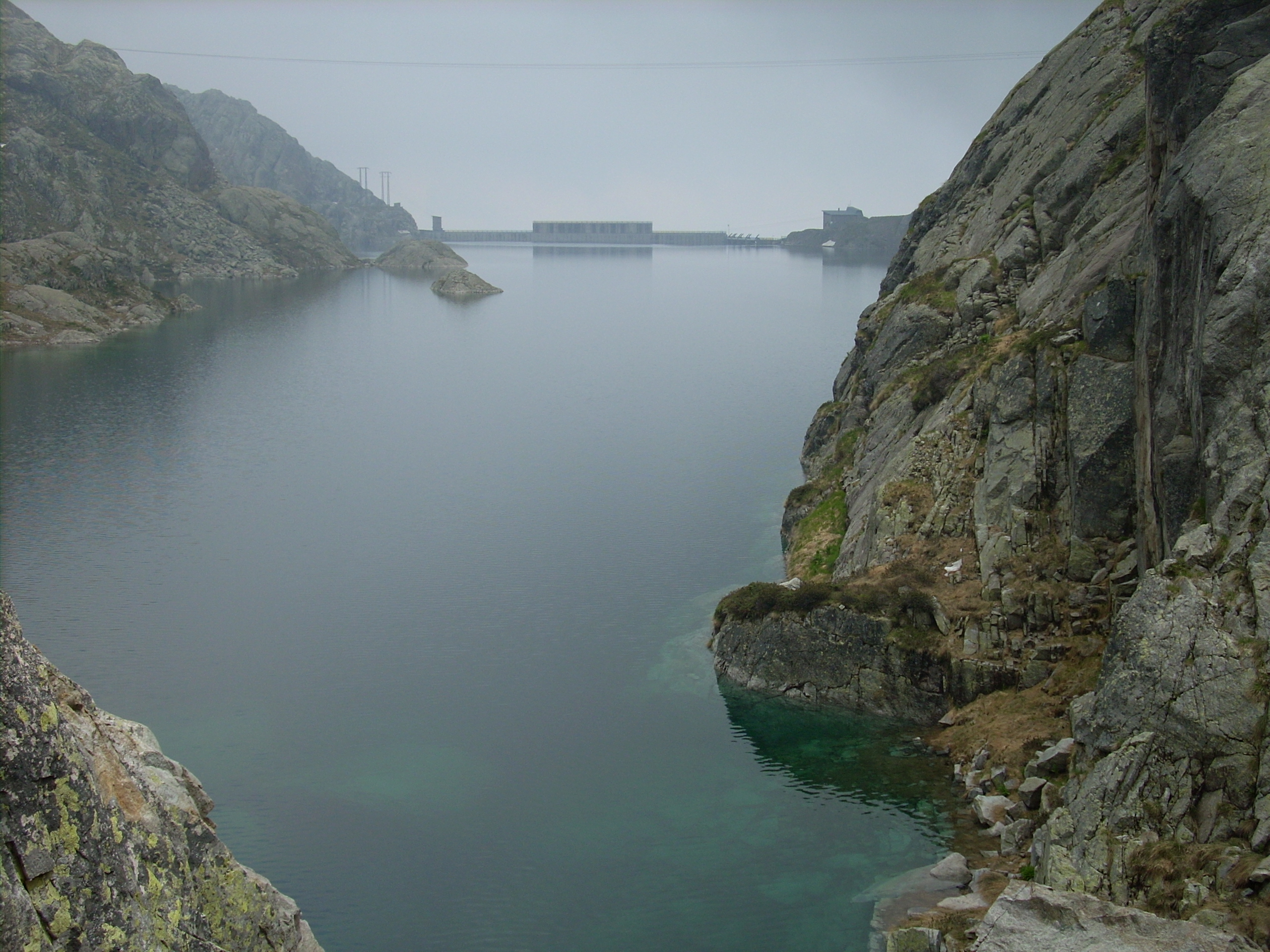

- Location within Lombardy
- Location: Province of Bergamo, Lombardy
- Coordinates: 45.998497°N 9.873984°E
- Primary inflows: torrente Goglio
- Primary outflows: Goglio
- Basin countries: Italy
- Surface area: 0.16 km^{2} (0.062 sq mi)
- Surface elevation: 2,014 m (6,608 ft)

Lago Nero is a lake in the Province of Bergamo, Lombardy, Italy. At an elevation of 2014 m, its surface area is 0.16 km^{2}.
