= Lago Nero (Pistoia) =

Lake in the Province of Pistoia, Tuscany, Italy

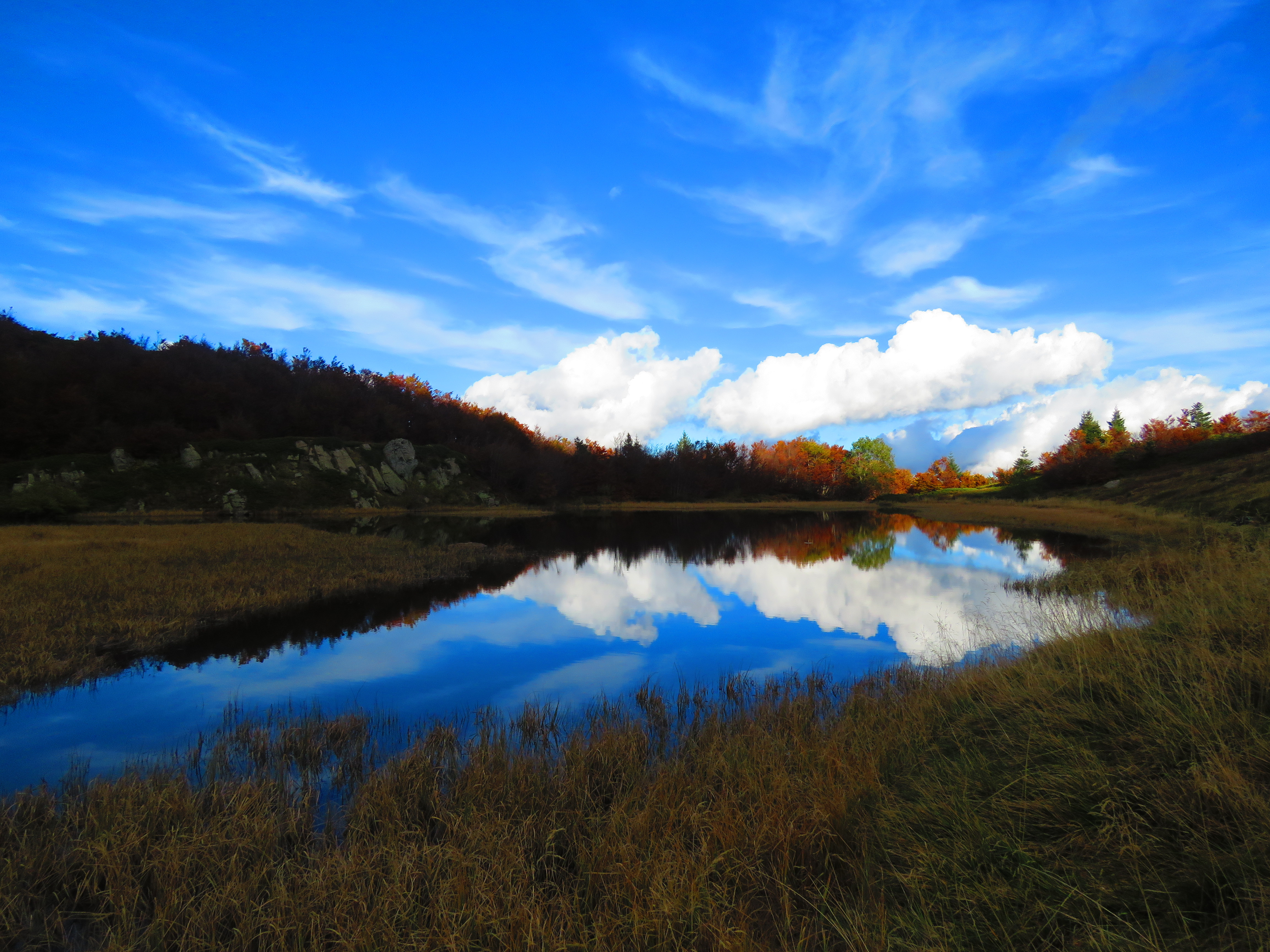

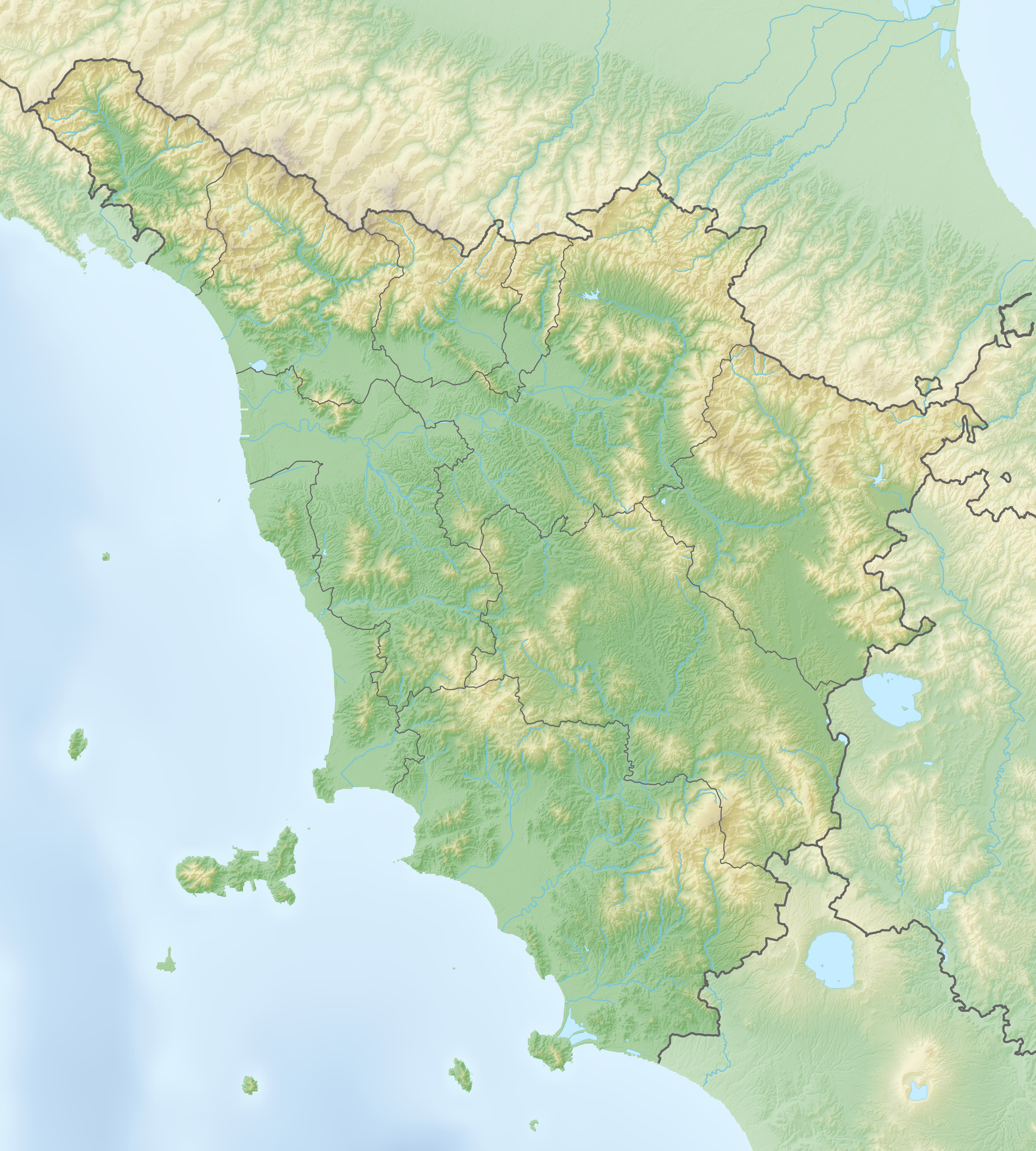
- Location within Tuscany
- Location: 51021 Abetone Cutigliano, Province of Pistoia, Tuscany
- Coordinates: 44°07′N 10°38′E
- Primary outflows: Sestaione-Lima
- Basin countries: Italy
- Surface area: 0.08 km^{2} (0.031 sq mi)
- Surface elevation: 1,730 m (5,680 ft)

Lago Nero (Italian for "black lake") is a lake in the Province of Pistoia, Tuscany, Italy. At an elevation of 1730 m, its surface area is 0.08 km².

== Description ==
The lake is 1730 metre above sea level and near the Apennines mountain. Nearby it is the Sassi Scritti forest.
