= Lake Moo =

Glacial lake in Emilia-Romagna, Italy

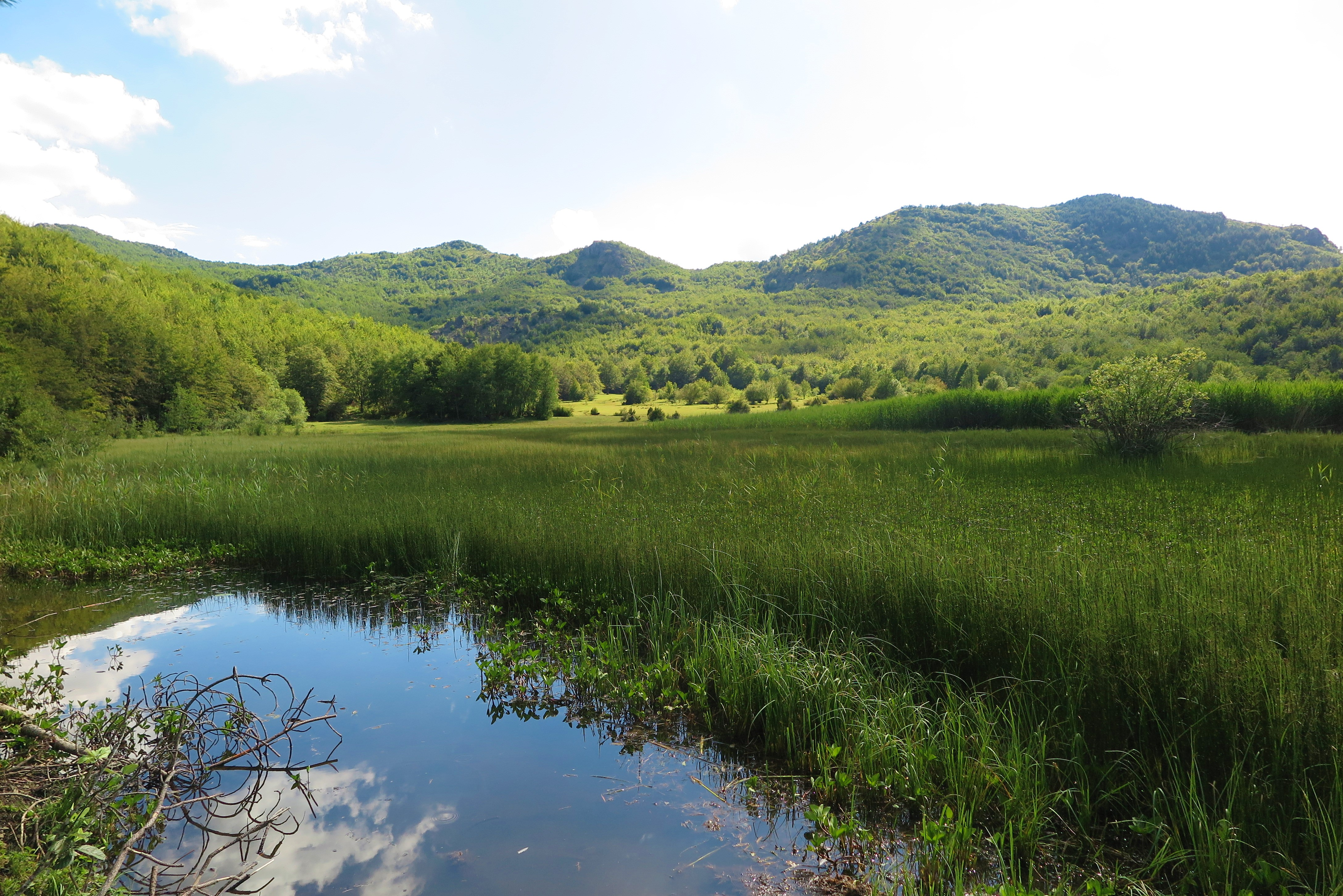
- The lake with the backdrop plateau
- Interactive map of Lake Moo
- Location: Ferriere, Province of Piacenza, Emilia-Romagna, Italy
- Coordinates: 44.6258°N 9.5424°E
- Type: Glacial
- Basin countries: Italy
- Surface elevation: 1,110 m (3,640 ft)

The Lake Moo (pronounced [mu]) or Lake Mu. is a small glacial lake basin located at 1,110 m (3,640 ft) on a plateau in the Piacenza section of the Ligurian Apennines, in the municipality of Ferriere, in the Province of Piacenza. Formed by glacial damming, it is in an advanced state of infilling

== Hydronym and etymology ==
The hydronym Moo or Mu, sometimes rendered as Mou and also transcribed as Mone by Antonio Boccia, would seem to mean "wet," "damp" from moio or moia (marshy terrain), deriving from the Latin molleus (see also the Piacentino möi with a similar meaning).

== Geography ==
The lake itself is limited to a few tens of square meters of surface area, while a vast surrounding area of several thousand square meters is marshy and covered with grassy vegetation typical of mid-altitude Apennines. The water body is transforming into a peat bog., an environment that characterizes the entire area

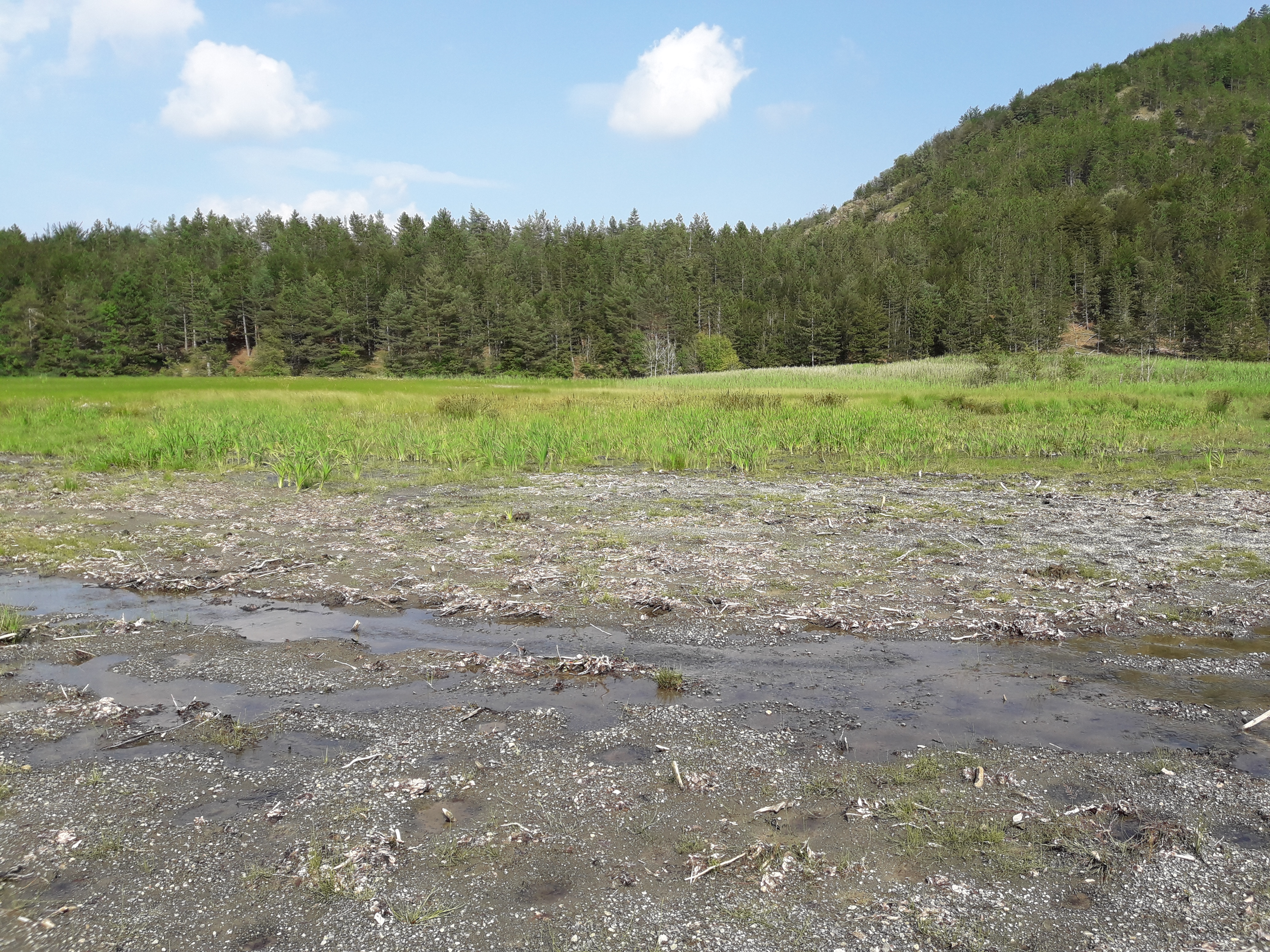
The marshy area at the edge of the water body

== Events ==
From 1989 for thirty years, the municipality of Ferriere organized the Festinquota., a countryside tent gathering that in each edition saw the participation of thousands of people from neighboring provinces. The behavior of some participants forced law enforcement to prohibit the lighting of fires in wooded areas or dangerous zones, allowing the use of a few designated areas for collective use

== Infrastructure and transport ==
=== Access trails ===
Lake Moo is reachable from Canadello, a hamlet of Ferriere, by ascending the wide mule track marked with trail number 021, approximately 4 km (2.5 mi) long and not accessible by motorized vehicles. The moderate slopes and low difficulties make the hiking route suitable even for untrained hikers and families

== Bibliography ==
- Scognamiglio, G. Franco; Macellari, Gino, eds. (1971). Valnure e Valceno [Valnure and Valceno] (in Italian). Piacenza: Camera di Commercio di Piacenza.
- Andrei, M.; Gandolfi, G. (1965). I Laghi di Val Nure (Appennino Piacentino). Fisiografia e idrobiologia [The Lakes of Val Nure (Piacentino Apennines). Physiography and Hydrobiology] (in Italian). Istituto poligrafico delle Stato.
- Bearesi, Luigi (1982). Piccolo Dizionario del Dialetto Piacentino [Small Dictionary of the Piacentino Dialect] (in Italian). Piacenza: Editrice Berti.
- Boccia, Antonio (1977). Viaggio ai monti di Piacenza (1805) [Travels to the Mountains of Piacenza (1805)] (in Italian). Piacenza: T.E.P. Tipografia Editrice Piacentina.
- Boreri, Aldo (2000) [1939]. Le bellezze dei monti di Ferriere [The Beauties of the Ferriere Mountains] (in Italian). Piacenza: Società Tip. Editoriale Porta.
- Carlevero, Giorgio. Sentieri piacentini [Piacentino Trails] (in Italian). Vol. I. Piacenza: Editoriale Libertà.
- Pellegrini, Giovan Battista (1990). Toponomastica italiana [Italian Toponymy] (in Italian). Milan: Hoepli.
- Tammi, Guido (1998). Vocabolario Piacentino - Italiano [Piacentino-Italian Vocabulary] (in Italian). Piacenza: Ed. Banca di Piacenza.

=== Cartography ===
- Appennino Piacentino 2 - Val Trebbia e Val Nure [Piacentino Apennines 2 - Val Trebbia and Val Nure] (in Italian). Infocartografica SCN e CAI Piacenza. 2021.
