= Colli Piacentini =

Italian wine region

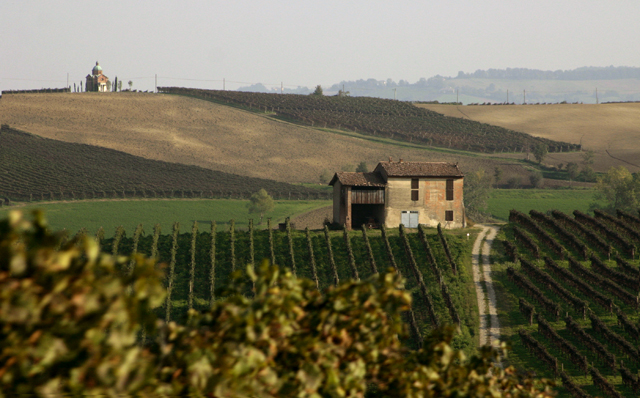
A vineyard in the Colli Piacentini

The Colli Piacentini ("Hills of Piacenza") are an Italian wine region located at the western end of Emilia-Romagna. In 1967, the region was given the denominazione di origine controllata (DOC) quality designation. Within its boundaries are several smaller DOCs including Colli Piacentini Gutturnio, Monterosso Val D'Arda DOC, Trebbianino Val Trebbia DOC, and Val Nur del Colli Piacentini DOC. The region has a long history of winemaking with fossilized vine roots and grape seeds excavated from the region showing viticulture taking place as early as 2000 BC. In Roman times, Julius Caesar's father-in-law Lucius Calpurnius Piso Caesoninus, grew grapes in the Piacenza hills.

The Colli Piacentini region was once considered part of the Piedmont wine region. To the northwest is the Lombardy wine region of Oltrepò Pavese and, like Oltrepò Pavese, the wine industry of the Colli Piacentini has had strong historical ties to the wine markets of Milan. The region produces over 17 different wines ranging from Vin Santo dessert wines to slightly sparkling frizzante wines. While the practice of labeling wines by varietal is more often associated with New World wines, winemakers in the Colli Piacentini are permitted by DOC regulations to label some of their wines by varietal.

== History ==
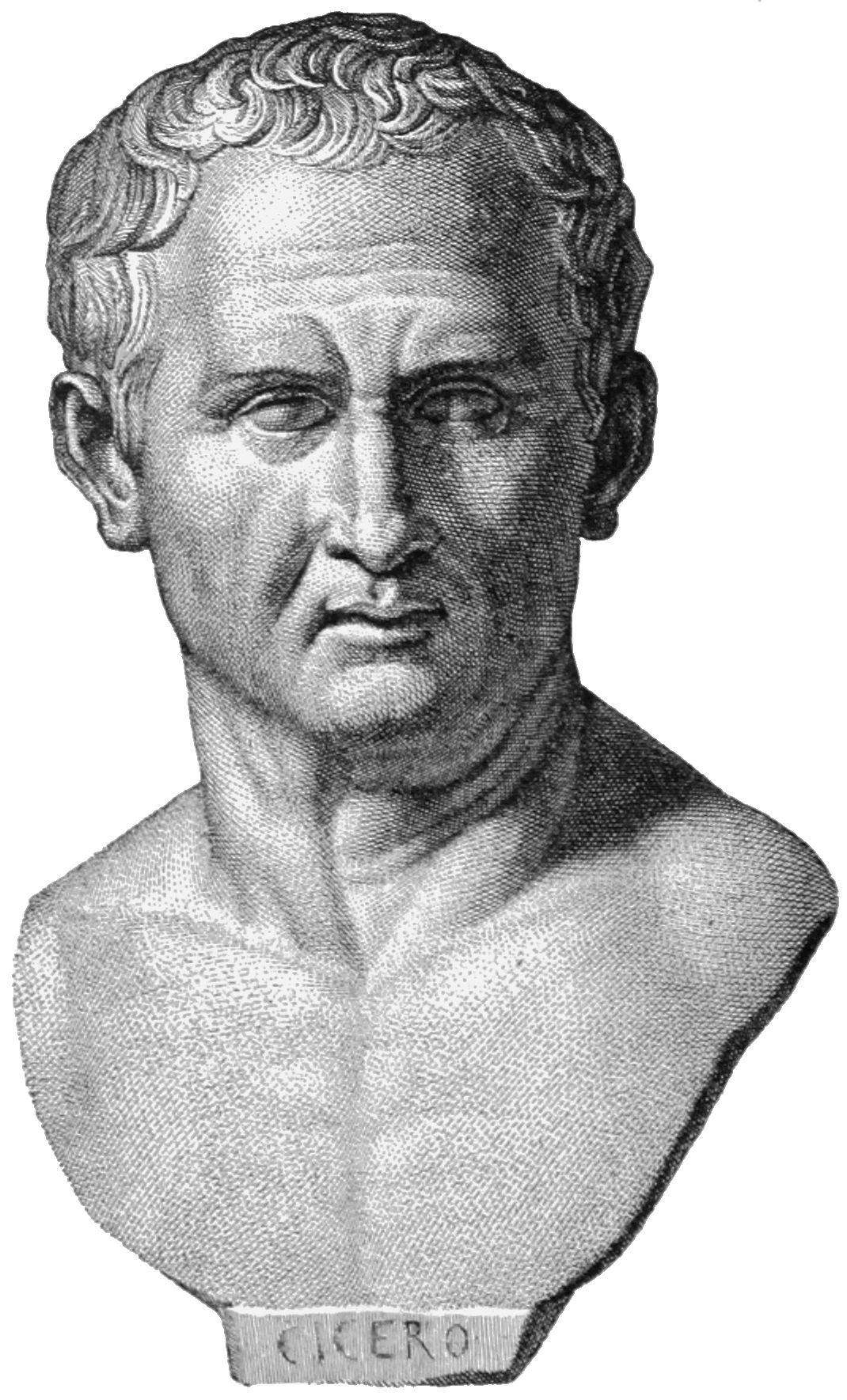
The Roman statesman Cicero once criticized Julius Caesar's father-in-law for "excessively enjoying" the wines of the Colli Piacentini.

The Piacenza hills have a long tradition of viticulture. Archeological excavation of sites in the area has uncovered fossilized vine roots and grape seeds dating from 700 to 2000 BC. During the classical period, the Roman statesman Lucius Calpurnius Piso Caesoninus (father-in-law to Julius Caesar), was publicly criticized by his political rival Marcus Tullius Cicero for "excessively enjoying" or honoring the wines from the area. Calpurnius Piso's affinity for the wines of the Colli Piacentini may have stemmed from the fact that he himself grew grapes and produced wine in the area. In Roman times, the wine from the area was traditionally drunk from a gutturnium—a round jug with two parallel lines of decoration on the outside. The vessel eventually gave its name to the modern Colli Piacentini wine of Gutturnio.

During the Middle Ages, wine from the Colli Piacentini had a favorable reputation and was even being exported to France. In the late 14th century, local officials instituted a series of regulations on winemaking and grape growing aimed at reducing the potential for wine fraud and maintaining standards of quality. In the 16th century, the official cellar master to Pope Paul III praised the wine for its quality in his writings on the wines of the world.

== Climate and geography ==
The Colli Piacentini DOC covers 9,000 acres (3,600 hectares) of hilly terrain in what was historically part of the Emilia province. The DOC is flanked to the east by the Autostrada A1 connecting Milan to Naples and to the west/northwest by Liguria, Lombardy, and Piedmont. To the southeast is the Colli di Parma DOC centered on the city of Parma. Many of the vineyards of the Colli Piacentini are planted on the rolling hills leading up to the northern slopes of the Apennine Mountains. The vineyard soils are composed of a mix of clay, marl, sand and sandstone from the Pliocene epoch.

== Sub-regions ==
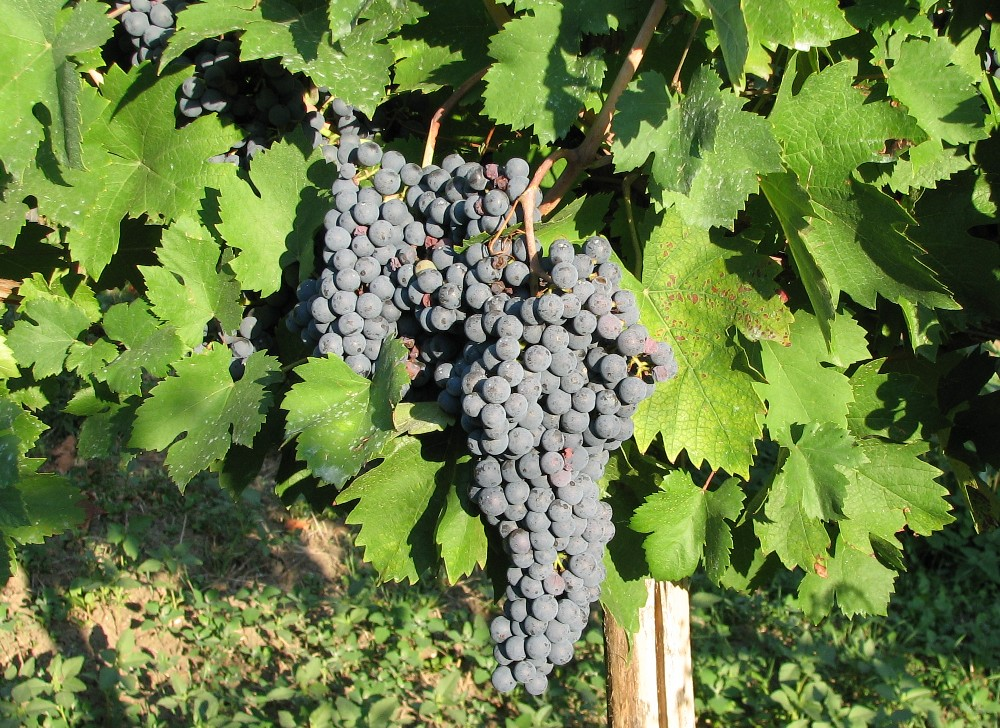
Croatina (also known as Bonarda in the Colli Piacentini) is blended with Barbera to make Gutturnio.

Within the Colli Piacentini are a number of sub-regions that are allowed to affix their own DOCs to the wine label. The most famous of these is the Gutturnio DOC, with a wine made predominantly from Barbera, which is the only main sub-region dedicated to red wine production. The other sub-regions are white wine DOCs, including Trebbianino Val Trebbia, which despite its similar-sounding name, is not made predominantly from Trebbiano but rather the obscure local grape Ortruga, though up to 30% of the specific clonal variety of Trebbiano Romagnolo can be blended in. The two other white wine DOCs are Val Nur and Monterosso Val d'Arda.

- Gutturnio - The most famous wine of the Colli Piacentini, its name historically derived from the traditional gutturnium jug that people drank the wine from. It is a blend of 55-70% Barbera, with Croatina filling out the rest of the blend. It can be produced in a variety of styles ranging from dry to slightly sweet and from still to slightly sparkling. Under the DOC's regulations, harvest yields are restricted to a maximum of 12 tonnes per hectare, and the alcohol level of the wines must reach a minimum of 12%.
- Trebbianino Val Trebbia - This white wine DOC is based primarily on the Ortruga grape which usually composes half the blend. The remaining components may include 10-30% of Malvasia di Candia and/or Moscato Bianco, 15-30% of Trebbiano Romagnolo and/or Sauvignon blanc and a maximum of 15% mix of other permitted white grape varieties grown in the Colli Piacentini. Harvest yields are restricted to 9 tonnes per hectare and alcohol levels need to be a minimum of 11%. The wines range from dry to semi-dry and can be still, slightly sparkling, or even fully sparkling or spumante style.
- Monterosso Val d'Arda - This white wine DOC has similar requirements as Trebbianino except that the Ortruga grape plays a smaller role in the blend. The blend for this wine is composed of 35-50% Malvasia di Candia, 20-35% of Ortruga and Trebbiano Romagnolo, 10-30% Moscato and up to 20% of Sauvignon blanc and Bervedino. Harvest yields are restricted to a maximum of 9 tonnes per hectare and alcohol levels must reach a minimum of 11%. The wines range from dry to semi-dry and can be still, slightly sparkling or even fully sparkling or spumante style.
- Val Nur - This white wine DOC has similar requirements as Trebbianino except that use of Moscato is prohibited. The primary grape varieties are 30-50% Malvasia di Candia, 20-35% Ortrugo and 20-35% Trebbiano Romagnolo with up to a 15% mix of other permitted white grape varieties grown in the Colli Piacentini. Harvest yields are restricted to a maximum of 10 tonnes per hectare and a minimum alcohol level of 11%. The wines range from dry to semi-dry and can be still, slightly sparkling or even fully sparkling or spumante style.

== Grapes and wine style ==
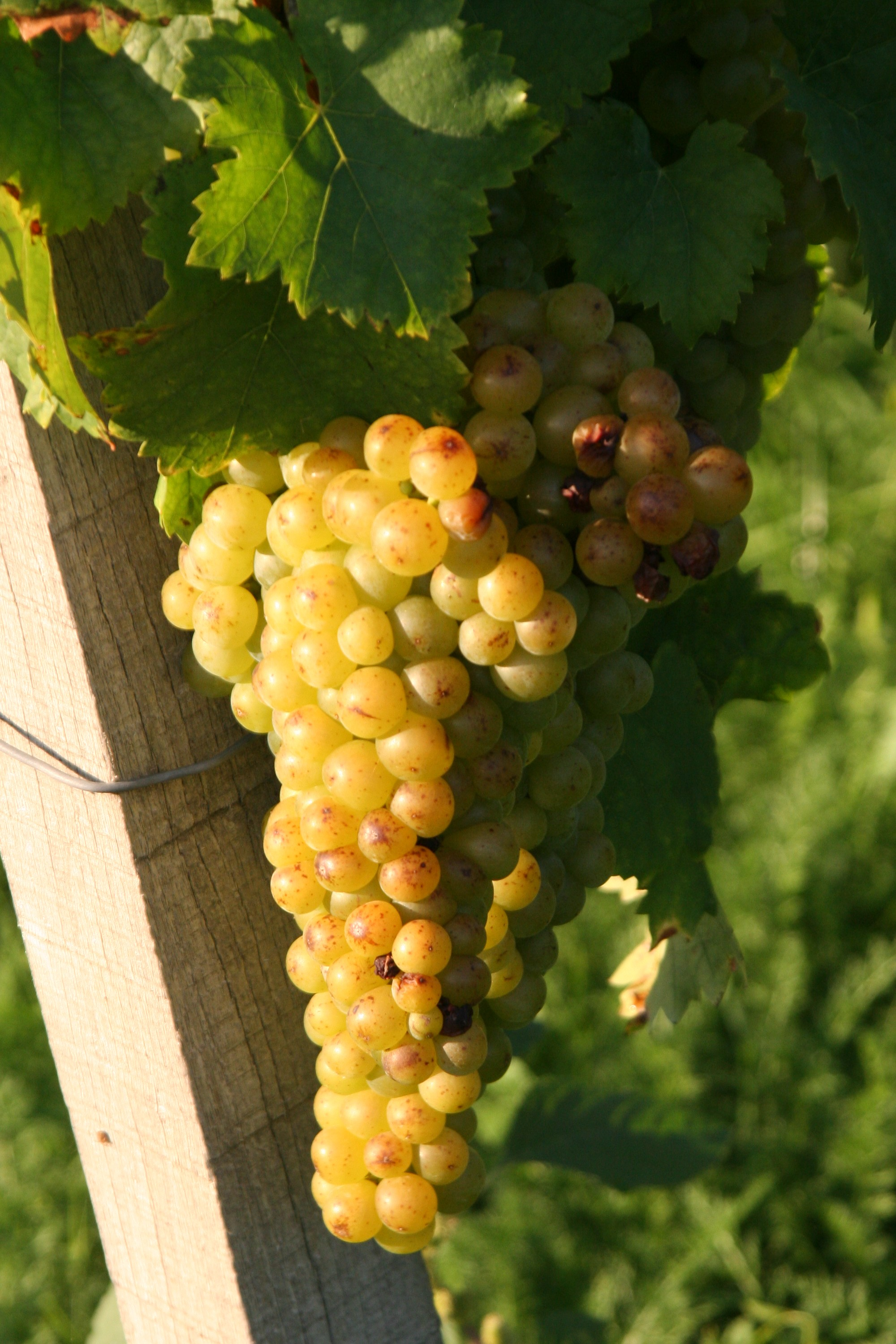
Moscato Bianco is known throughout the world under a variety of synonyms including Muscat Blanc à Petits Grains.

A wide range of grape varieties and wine styles are produced in the Colli Piacentini. In addition to red and white wines, rosé rosato styles are produced. The sweetness level of the wines can range from bone dry asciutto, very dry amaro, dry secco, slightly sweet abboccato, sweet amabile, medium-sweet pastoso to very sweet dolce. The wines can also vary widely in their degree of carbonation or "sparkling", ranging from still, very lightly sparkling frizzantino, slightly sparkling frizzante to fully sparkling spumante. A Vin Santo style wine can be made from dried grapes as well as young novello or "nouveau wines" released only a few months after harvest. One producer in the Colli Piacentini even produces rare sweet fully sparkling Cabernet Sauvignon and Merlot.

In a manner that is fairly unusual in Old World wine regions, a few wines in the Colli Piacentini can be varietally labeled with the grape's name appearing on the front of the wine label. This privilege is restricted to only a few grape varieties namely Barbera, Croatina, Cabernet Sauvignon, Pinot nero, Chardonnay, Malvasia, Ortrugo, Pinot grigio and Sauvignon blanc. In order to qualify for this permission, a wine must be composed of at least 85% of the grape that is to appear on the label. An exception is the local grape Ortrugo which must compose at least 90% of the wine. Among the other grape varieties grown in the Colli Piacentini, which can not be varietally labeled, are Trebbiano Romagnolo, Bervedino, Verdeca and Moscato bianco.
