= Ferriere =

- Comune
- Comune di Ferriere
- Location within Italy Location within Emilia-Romagna
- Coordinates: 44°39′N 9°30′E
- Country: Italy
- Region: Emilia-Romagna
- Province: Piacenza (PC)
- Frazioni: Brugneto, Canadello, Casaldonato, Cassimoreno, Castagnola Castelcanafurone, San Gregorio, Cattaragna, Ciregna, Gambaro, Grondone Pertuso, Rocca, Rompeggio, Salsominore, Selva, Torrio, Solaro

Government
  - Mayor: Carlotta Oppizzi

Area
  - Total: 179.5 km^{2} (69.3 sq mi)
- Elevation: 626 m (2,054 ft)

Population (Dec. 2004)
  - Total: 1,823
  - Density: 10.16/km^{2} (26.30/sq mi)
- Demonym: Ferrierese
- Time zone: UTC+1 (CET)
  - Summer (DST): UTC+2 (CEST)
- Postal code: 29024
- Dialing code: 0523
- Website: Official website

Ferriere (Ligurian: E Ferrër; Piacentino: Al Frér) is a comune (municipality) in the Province of Piacenza in the Italian region Emilia-Romagna, located about 150 kilometres (93 mi) west of Bologna and about 45 kilometres (28 mi) southwest of Piacenza, in the Val Nure of the Ligurian Apennines.

Ferriere borders the following municipalities: Bardi, Bedonia, Cerignale, Coli, Corte Brugnatella, Farini, Ottone, Rezzoaglio, Santo Stefano d'Aveto.

== Demographic evolution ==
Historical population

Year	Pop.	±%
1861	6,629	—
1871	7,411	+11.8%
1881	7,373	−0.5%
1901	7,101	−3.7%
1911	6,844	−3.6%

Year	Pop.	±%
1921	7,659	+11.9%
1931	6,142	−19.8%
1936	6,305	+2.7%
1951	6,469	+2.6%
1961	5,493	−15.1%

Year	Pop.	±%
1971	3,629	−33.9%
1981	3,146	−13.3%
1991	2,675	−15.0%
2001	2,010	−24.9%

Source: Data from ISTAT

== See also ==
- Lake Bino
- Lake Moo
