= Nure =

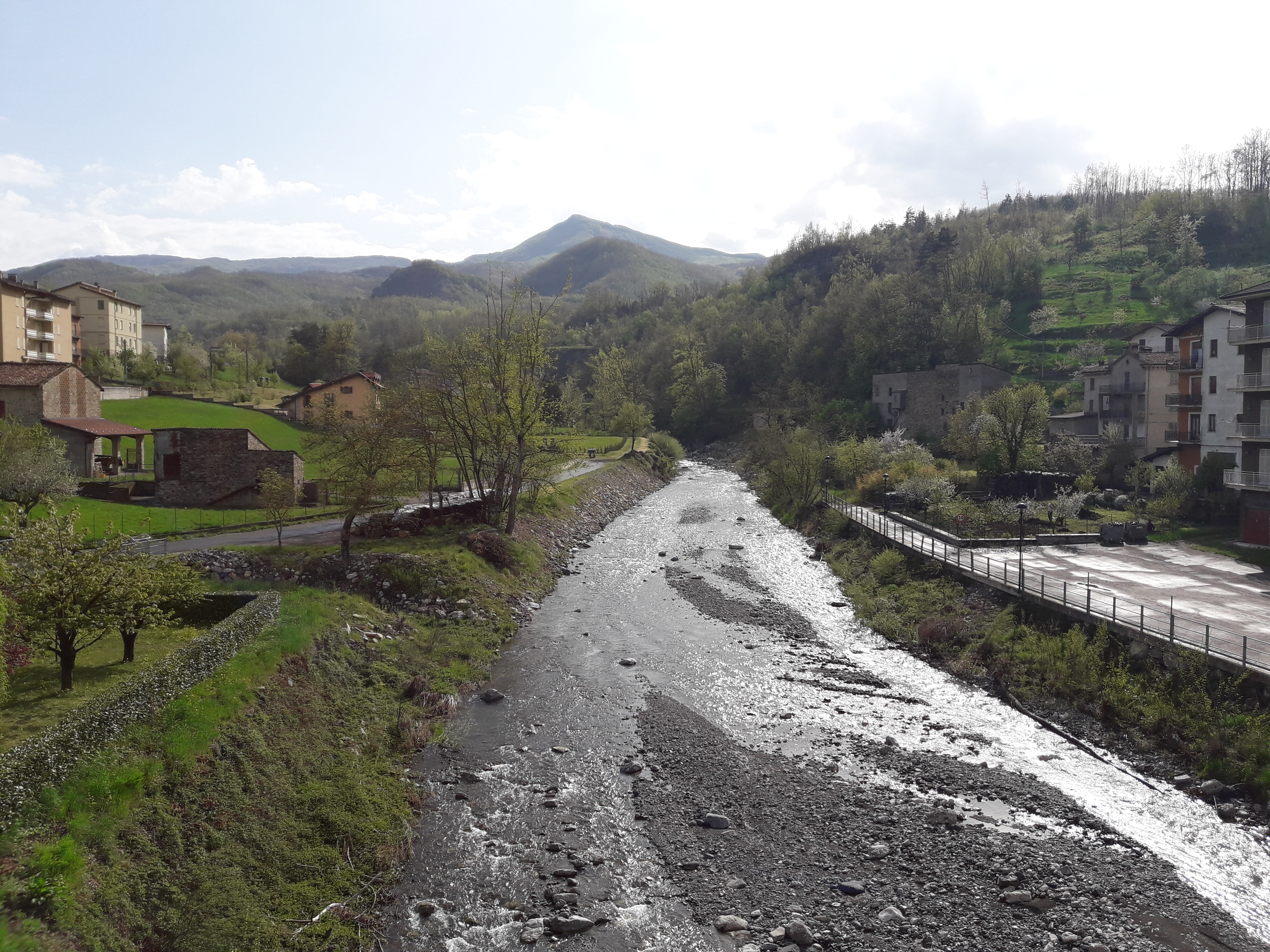

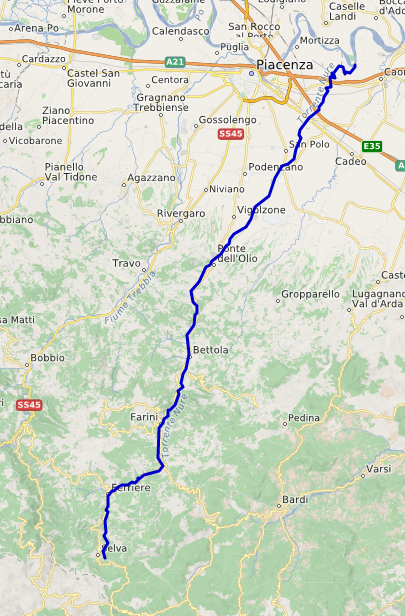

Location
- Country: Italy

Physical characteristics
- Source
  - location: Monte Nero
  - elevation: 81,800 m (5,900 ft)
- Mouth
  - location: Po, between Caorso and Caselle Landi
  - coordinates: 45.0595°N 9.8340°E
- Length: 75 km (47 mi)
- Discharge
  - average: 15 m^{3}/s (530 cu ft/s)

Basin features
- Progression: Po→ Adriatic Sea

The Nure (Latin Nura) is a small river in northern Italy (province of Piacenza). It has its source on the northern slopes of Mt. Nero, elevation 1,754 metres (5,755 ft) above sea level, and after a course of about 75 kilometres (47 mi)—the second longest of the province—flows into the Po River 10 kilometres (6 mi) east of Piacenza, in the vicinity of Roncarolo, a frazione of the commune of Caorso, on the border with the Lombard commune of Caselle Landi.

The upper valley is somewhat influenced by the sea air, keeping it free of fog and strong winds, and therefore relatively pleasant even during the winter months.

In this valley, there are 79 fortification (castles, fortified towers and dwellings, etc.)

The main villages along this river are: Ferriere, Bosconure, Cantoniera, Farini d'Olmo, Bettola, Ponte dell'Olio, Vigolzone, Grazzano Visconti, Podenzano.

In addition to the main villages, other areas of the Val Nure (Valley of the Nure) are delineated by parishes, with churches located along the peaks of the mountains. One example is Cogno San Bassano, at the top of the mountain above Farini d'Olmo.

In 1799 the French Auvergne Regiment was surrendered at this river during the Revolutionary Wars. This marked the end of the Battle of the Trebbia, in which Suvorov's Russian and Austrian troops won a complete victory.
