= Pigazzano =

- Frazione
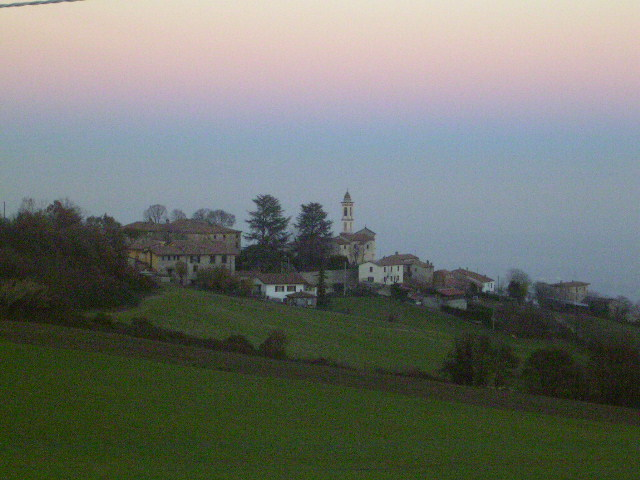

- Location of Pigazzano in Italy
- Coordinates: 44°54′20.56″N 9°33′14.36″E
- Country: Italy
- Region: Emilia-Romagna
- Province: Piacenza (PC)
- Comune: Travo

Area
  - Total: 6.2 km^{2} (2.4 sq mi)
- Elevation: 464 m (1,522 ft)

Population (Dec. 2009)
  - Total: 20
  - Density: 3.2/km^{2} (8.4/sq mi)
- Demonym: Pigazzanesi
- Time zone: UTC+1 (CET)
  - Summer (DST): UTC+2 (CEST)
- Postal code: 29020
- Dialing code: 0523
- Patron saint: St. Antonino of Piacenza
- Saint day: July, 4

Pigazzano is a frazione of the comune of Travo (Province of Piacenza) in the Italian region Emilia-Romagna, located about 24 km southwest of Piacenza.

== Geography ==
The village is located on a panoramic hill 8 km in north of Travo, near the Trebbia river valley and the town of Rivergaro. Nearest localities are Boffalora and Samiago. Ophiolite dominates the surrounding hills, as the Mount Pillerone (596 amsl).

== Events ==
Starting from 2003, the association Amici di Pigazzano (Friends of P.) organizes an annual sagra named Pigazzano sotto le stelle (P. under the stars), which lasts three days and takes place in the days of the Feast of the Assumption.

== Gallery ==
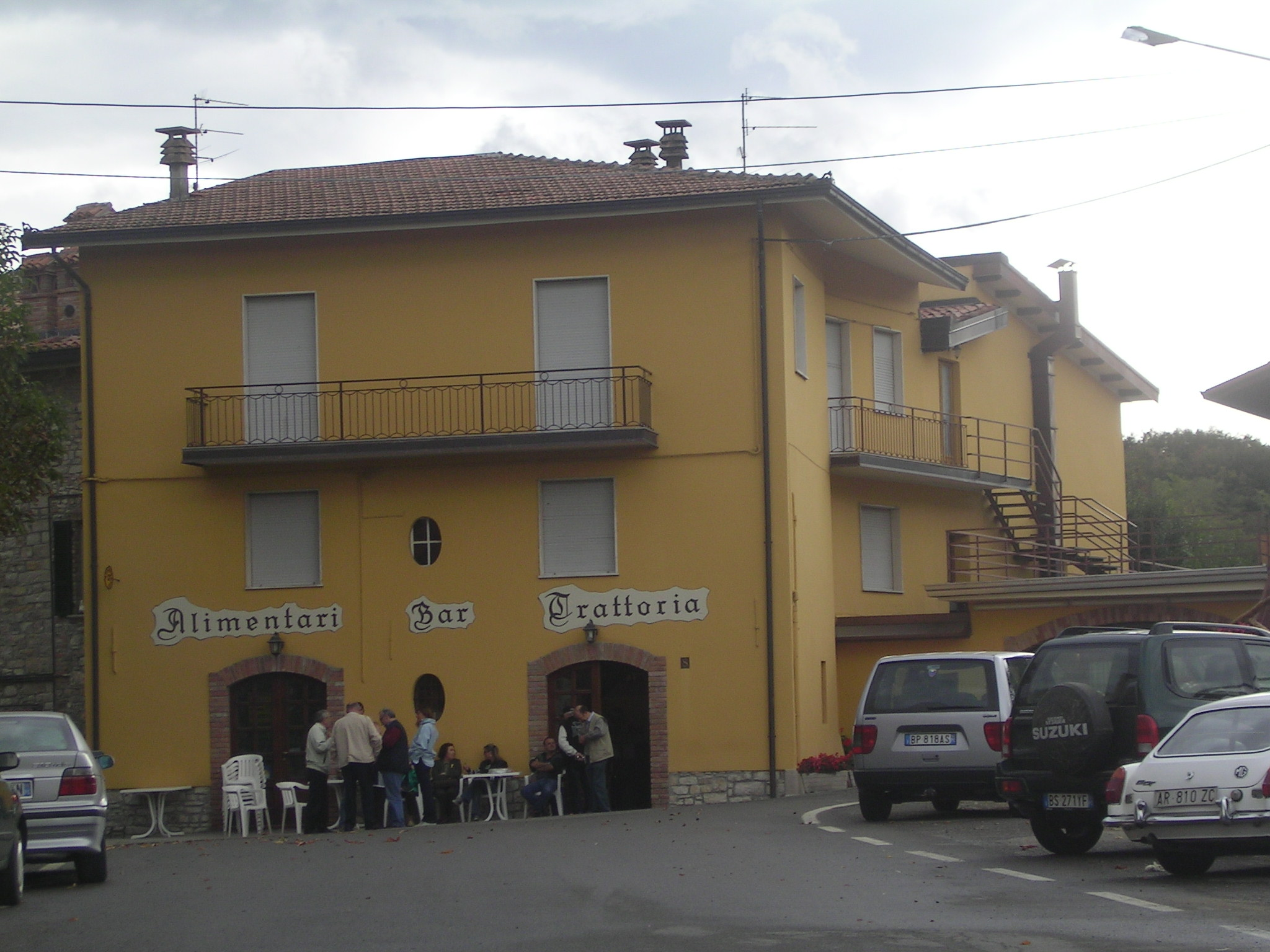
Village center

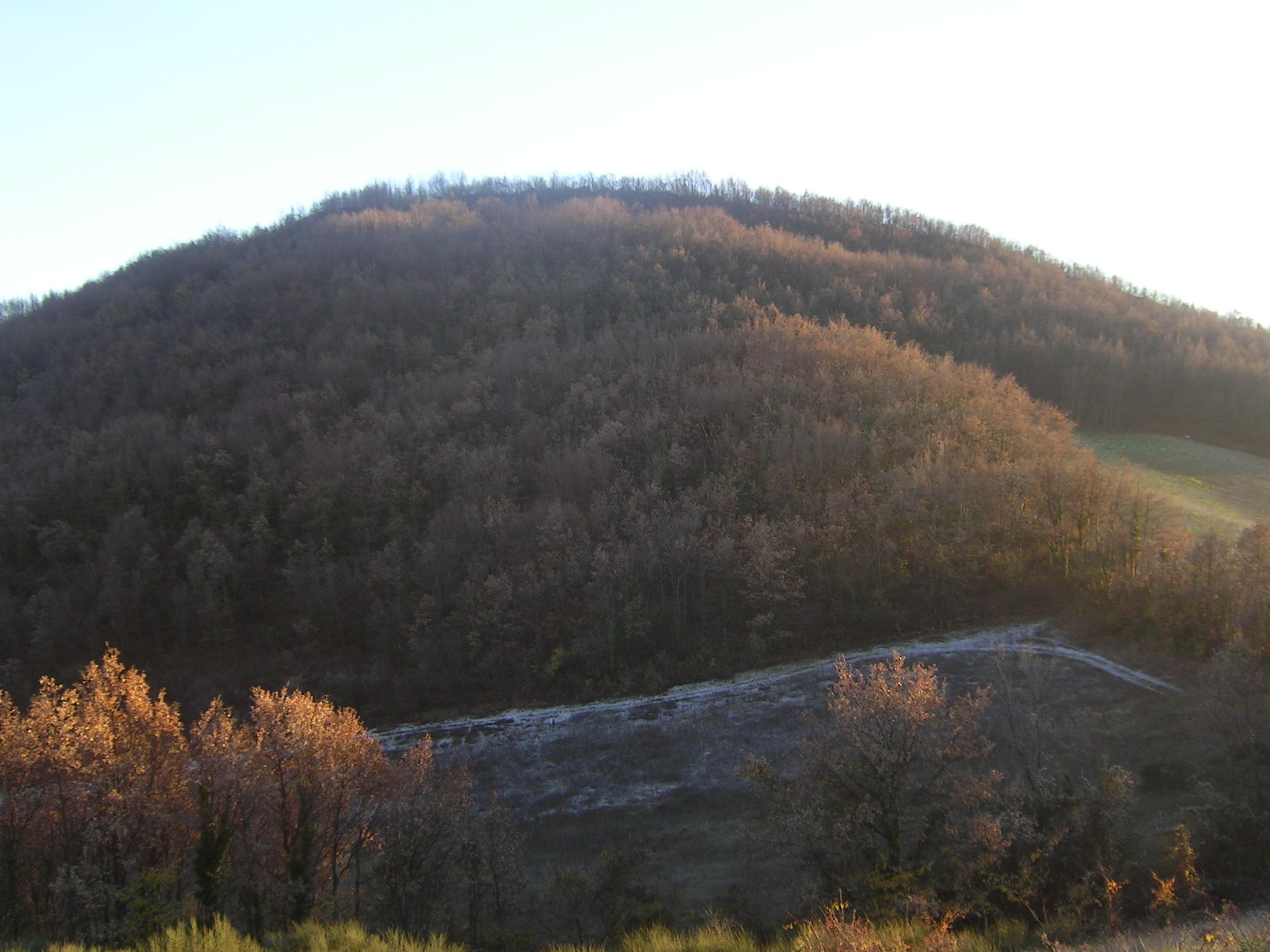
Mount Pillerone

== See also ==
- Pietra Parcellara
- Province of Piacenza
