= Monte Alfeo =

Mountain in Italy

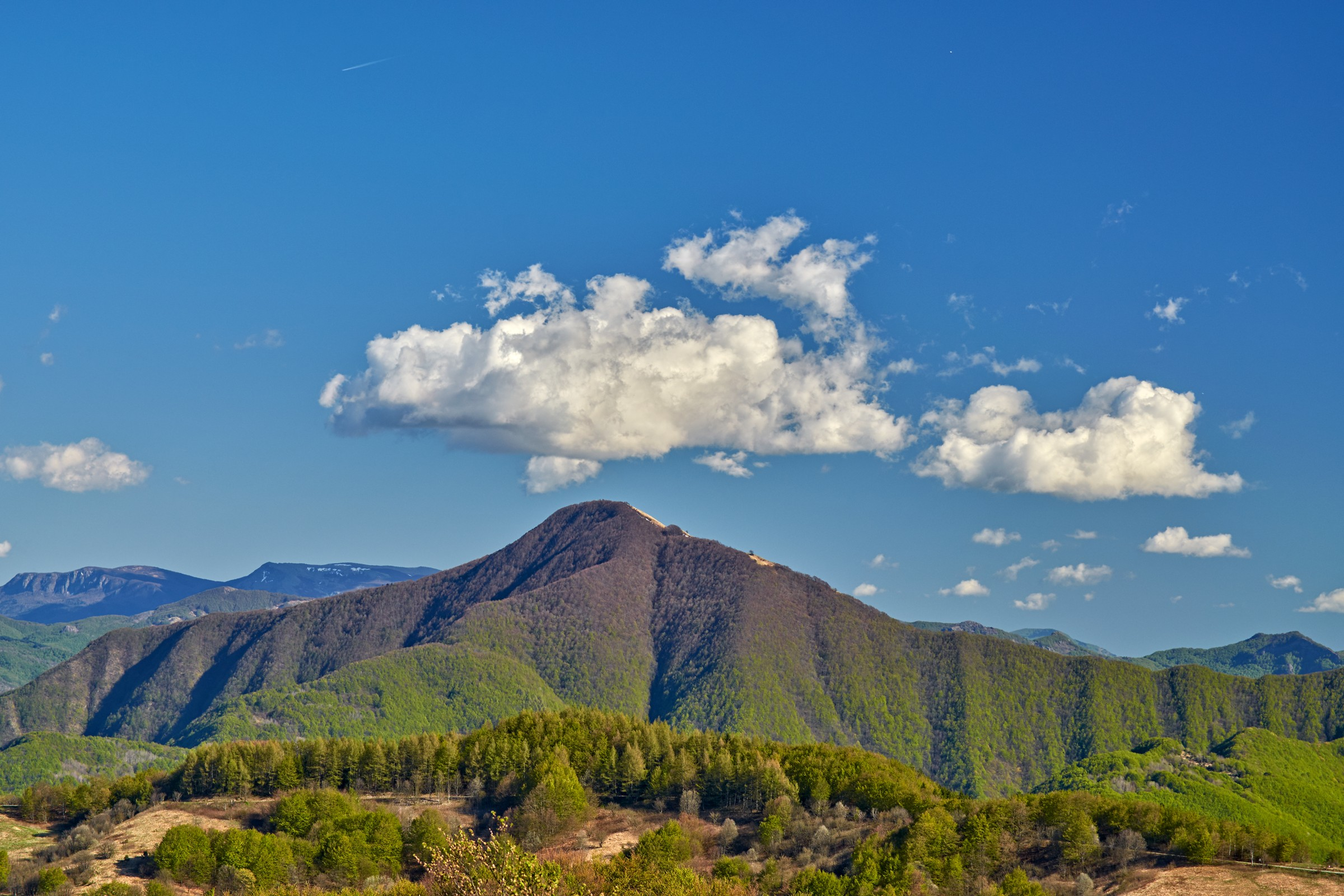
- Monte Alfeo Panorama in 2016

Highest point
- Elevation: 1,651 m (5,417 ft)
- Coordinates: 44°37′41″N 09°16′30″E

Geography
- Location within Italy
- Location: Emilia-Romagna, Italy
- Parent range: Ligurian Apennine

Monte Alfeo is a mountain in the Ligurian Apennine, located in the territory of the commune of Ottone, province of Piacenza, central Italy, in the left bank of the Val Trebbia. Having an altitude of 1,651 m, it is part of the Monte Antola group.

It has the appearance of a large, isolated pyramid, with slopes covered by forests.
