= Pietra Perduca =

Mountain in the Ligurian Apennines, Italy

- Pietra Perducca
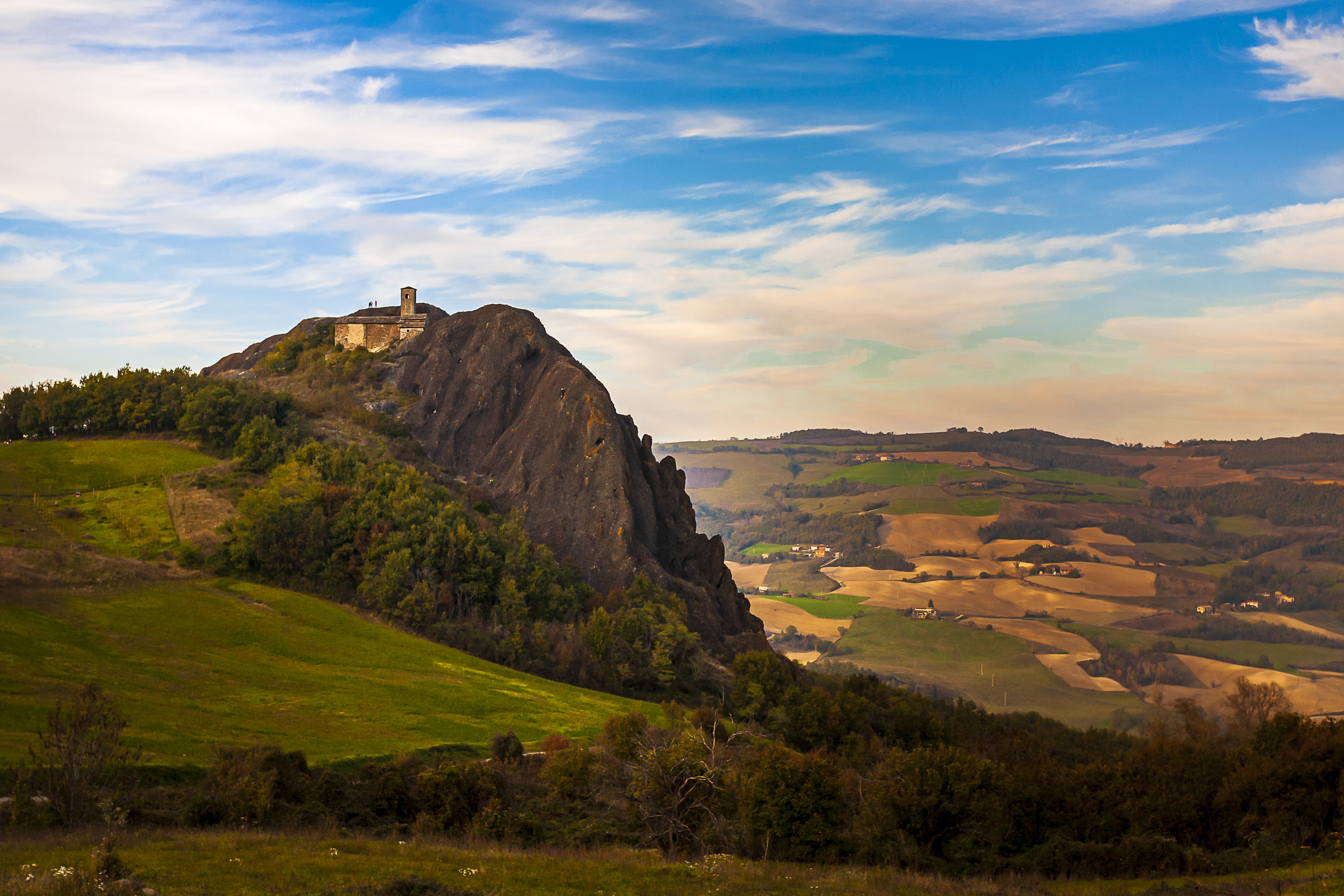
- Pietra Perduca with the Sant'Anna oratory

Highest point
- Coordinates: 44°51′06″N 9°29′21″E

Geography
- Country: Italy
- Region: Emilia-Romagna
- Parent range: Ligurian Apennines

The Pietra Perduca, or Perducca, is a mountain in the Ligurian Apennines located in Val Trebbia, in the Italian commune of Travo, in the Province of Piacenza.

Ophiolite of black serpentine, 659 m a.s.l., it prominently emerges from the slope between the left bank of the Trebbia river and the right bank of the Dorba stream., a tributary of the Trebbia, not far from the Pietra Parcellara, with which it forms part of the SIC-ZSC site of Pietra Parcellara and Pietra Perduca

== Geography ==
=== Geology ===
It is a fragment of the Earth's mantle, serpentine in nature, that ended up on the floor of the Piemont-Liguria Ocean before its closure, about 200 million years ago, following an underwater landslide (olistostrome) that affected a relief formed on the mantle constituting the ocean floor. This fragment was thus incorporated, as an olistolith, into the geological formation, rich in clayey components, that was depositing on the floor at that time, known as the chaotic complex or Pietra Parcellara complex

Once the Apennine ridge was formed, meteoric degradation processes and the action of erosive waters caused the hard serpentine mass to emerge, due to the phenomenon of differential erosion, making it dominate the surrounding landscape, primarily composed of scaly clays.

=== Flora and fauna ===
Despite being located in an area relatively lacking in wetlands and, consequently, seemingly unsuitable for them, Pietra Perduca hosts colonies of crested newts and alpine newts, which use the rainwater collection basins located at the summit of the relief for their reproduction. The rocky material walls provide a suitable habitat for diurnal raptors, including the kestrel, the sparrowhawk, the short-toed snake eagle, and the common buzzard

On the slopes, various species typical of serpentine environments are present, such as Asplenium cuneifolium, the Notholaena marantae, Minuartia laricifolia, Alyssum bertolonii, and Linum campanulatum. Near the base of the relief, there are small partially wooded areas where the dominant species is the hop hornbeam, alongside the downy oak and the serviceberry, as well as areas with a strong presence of conifers, primarily the black pine. Among the shrubs, the juniper, the hawthorn, and the wild pear are notable

== History ==
The first settlements near Pietra Perduca date back to Prehistory: remains from the Middle Neolithic have been found in the area, while traces of a settlement dating to the Bronze Age were found on the rocky eminence of the summit. The presence of stone-carved basins for collecting rainwater suggests the relief was used for pagan cults, particularly related to the worship of water. and the god Penn. Subsequently, some remains of fired materials suggest that a furnace may have been active in the area during the Roman era

A first religious building on the site may have been founded by the Columbanian monks of the Abbey of San Colombano, through whom, during the Early Middle Ages, the entire surrounding area was Christianized.; the first documented trace of this religious building, dedicated to the Assumption of Mary, dates to the 10th century

Subsequently, a castle was built on the summit of the relief, which, like the castle at the top of the nearby Pietra Parcellara, was part of the possessions of the Perduca family., from which the mountain's name derives. In 1117, the original religious building collapsed due to severe damage caused by the Verona earthquake. In its place, by the end of the 12th century, a new oratory was built. In 1170, the castle was occupied by Guelph troops from Piacenza, who, upon completing their operation, razed it to the ground

During the 15th century, the oratory was significantly remodeled, leaving only some traces, such as the remains of frescoes on the walls, of the pre-existing building.

== Monuments and places of interest ==
Oratory of Sant’Anna
On the western side is the Oratory of Sant’Anna, a 15th-century structure built on a pre-existing 12th-century building. Originally consecrated to the Assumption of Mary, it was dedicated to Sant’Anna in the 19th century. The building is accessible via a staircase made of stone steps. The facade is made of exposed stone and features a single central entrance portal, above which is an architrave. made from a repurposed stone inscribed with Latin and Celtic characters. The bell tower is located on the right side of the building, near the presbytery. The interior follows a single-nave layout and contains, on the right side, an altar dedicated to the Virgin Mary. There are also a series of 14th- and 15th-century paintings depicting, among others, Saint Anthony the Abbot, Saint Nicholas of Bari, Saint George, Saint Michael the soul-weigher, and Saint Columbanus

== See also ==
- Val Trebbia

== Bibliography ==
- "SIC IT4010005 Pietra Parcellara e Pietra Perduca – Quadro conoscitivo" [SIC IT4010005 Pietra Parcellara and Pietra Perduca – Knowledge Framework] (PDF) (in Italian). January 2018.
