= Colla di Boasi =

- Genoa in Italy
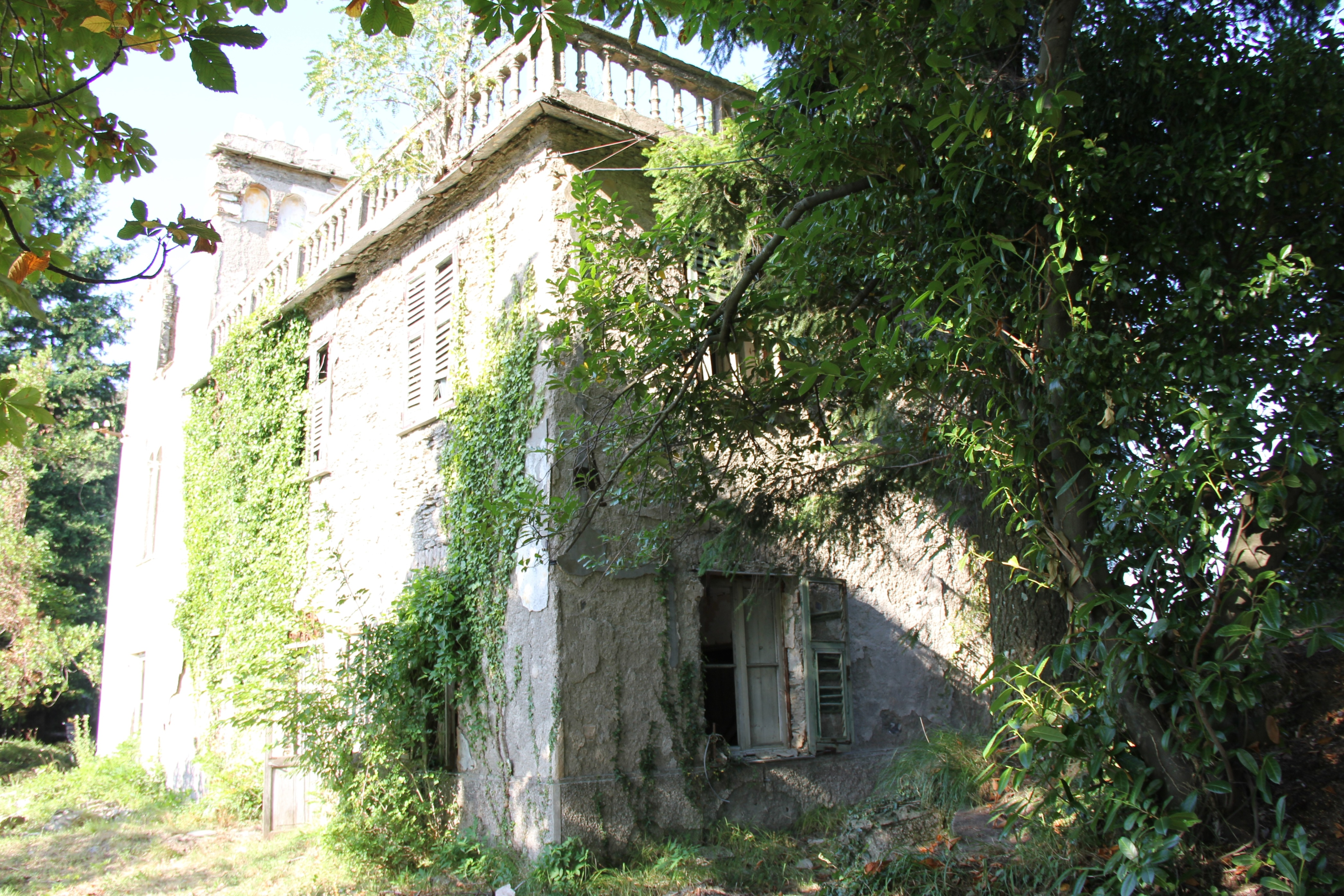

Site information
- Type: Castle

Location
- Coordinates: 44°28′5.36″N 9°6′30.59″E

Colla di Boasi is a location in the mountains surrounding Genoa, Italy, at an altitude of 651 meters above sea level.

== History ==
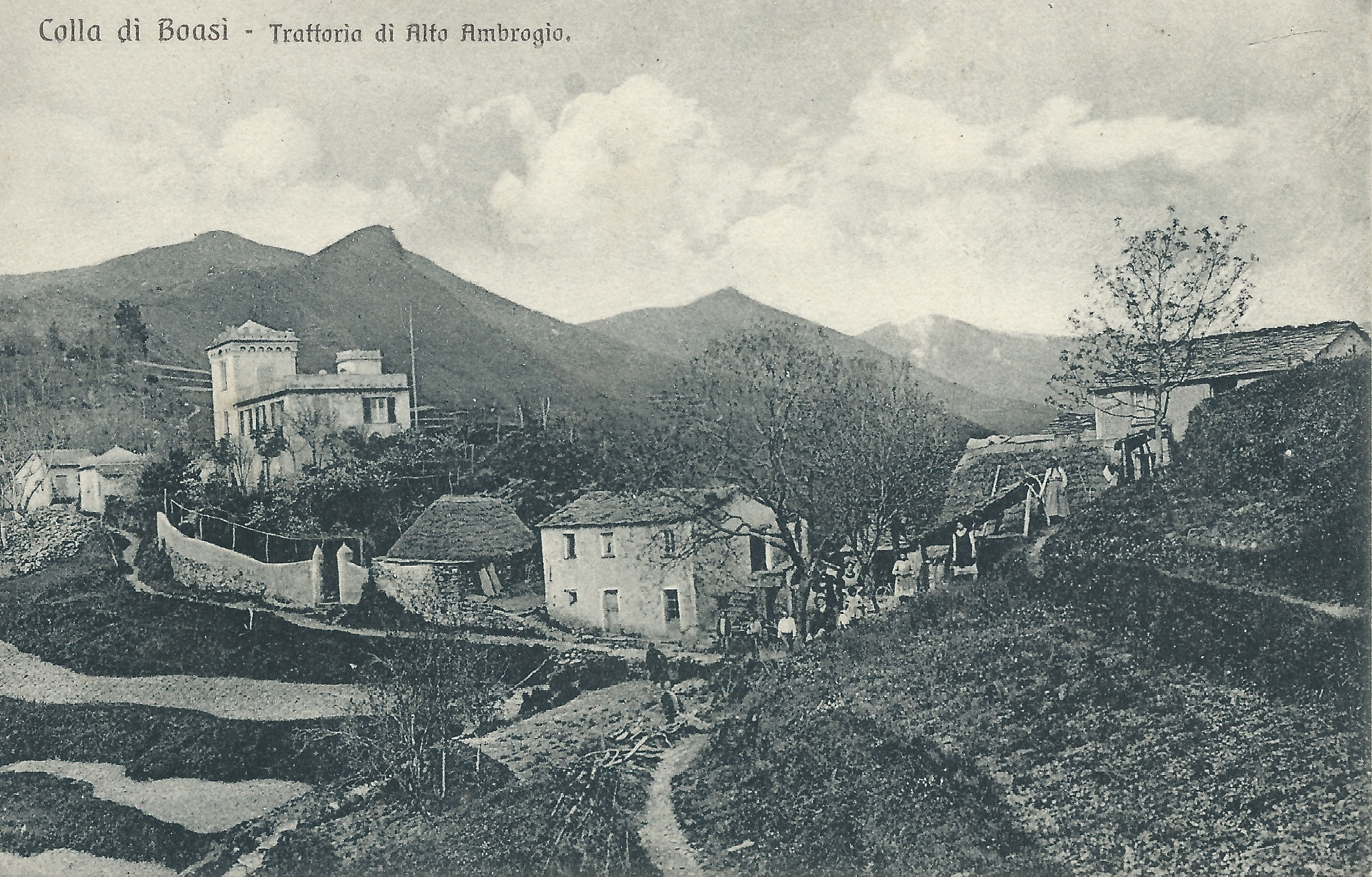
Il valico della Colla di Boasi tra le valli Fontanabuona e Bisagno nel 1920 circa

In ancient times the Colla di Boasi lay on the Via Salaria, one of the seven ancient paths which probably existed since Roman times, connecting the east of Genoa with the Po Valley. On this route, goods and food were transported by mule between Genoa and Piacenza. From the 1,597 meter Monte Antola, the route begins to descend rapidly towards the sea. After the Colletto pass, the winding mule track of large stones reaches the village of Donetta. After this village, the path goes through Torriglia, which was connected with Genoa via the Scoffera passage. In ancient times, before the tunnel was built, only the mountain path through Colla di Boasi connected with the main city of Liguria. On 5 March 1800, 2,500 French soldiers coming from Torriglia divided into three columns: one across the Scoffera and Boasi, the other along the slopes of the Colla di Boasi, and entered the Fontanabuona valley on the orders of General André Masséna to suppress the uprising there and the riots in the Ligurian Republic.

== Wildlife ==
In the first half of the 20th century, Colla di Boasi hosted one of two state-licensed points for tracking migratory and nesting birds in Liguria. Under the direction of Genserico Benvenuto, much work was done to catch and ring the various species of birds that nest in Liguria, including Carduelis cannabina (linnet), Emberiza melanocephala (black-headed bunting), Accipitrinae (hawks), Carduelis spinus (Eurasian siskin), and Anthus trivialis (tree pipit). For this purposes, Benvenuto was preparing the premises in Colla di Boasi for the short-term containment of birds. Between 1931 and 1935, 708 different bird species were recorded in the Colla di Boasi.
