= Monte Prelà =

Mountain in Italy

- Location within Italy

Highest point
- Elevation: 1,406 m (4,613 ft)
- Prominence: 90 m (300 ft)
- Coordinates: 44°32′24″N 09°09′23.5″E

Geography
- Country: Italy
- Province: Genoa
- Region: Liguria
- Protected area: Antola Natural Regional Park
- Parent range: Ligurian Apennines

Monte Prelà is a mountain in Liguria, northern Italy, part of the Ligurian Apennines.

== Geography ==
The mountain is located in the comune of Torriglia, province of Genoa, south of Monte Antola.

The sources of the Trebbia and Scrivia rivers, right affluents of the Po, are located at Monte Prelà.

== Conservation ==
The mountain since 1989 is included in the Antola Natural Regional Park.
