= Monte Carmo =

Mountain in Italy

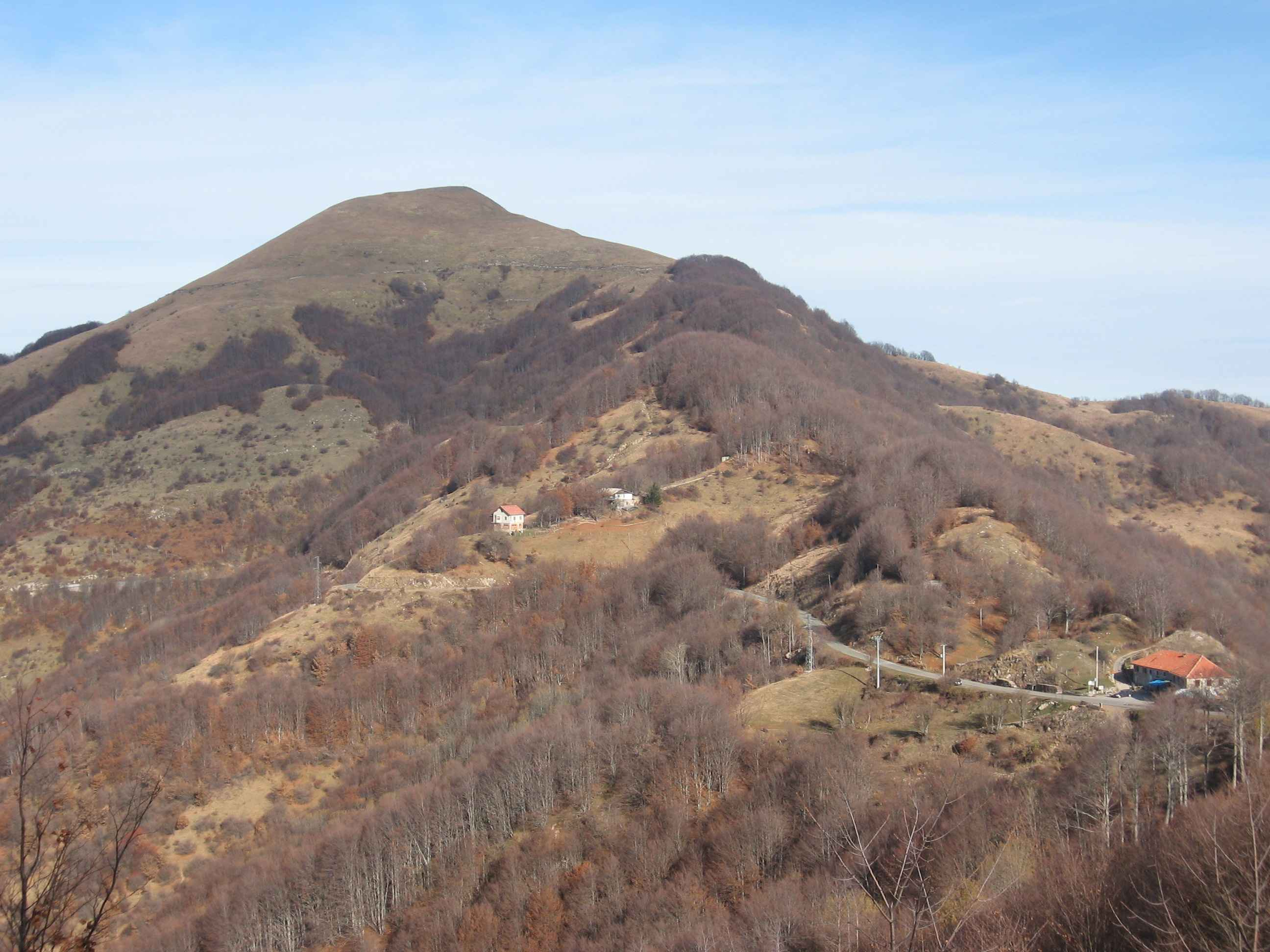

Highest point
- Elevation: 1,640 m (5,380 ft)
- Prominence: 174 m (571 ft)
- Coordinates: 44°36′54″N 09°11′56″E

Geography
- Location within Italy
- Location: Liguria, Piedmont, Emilia-Romagna, Italy
- Parent range: Ligurian Apennine

Monte Carmo is a mountain in the Ligurian Apennine, northern Italy.

== Geography ==
The mountain is located at the boundary between the three regions of Liguria, Piedmont and Emilia-Romagna. With an altitude of 1,640 metres (5,381 ft), it is part of the Monte Antola Group. Nearby are the Val Borbera, Val Trebbia, Val Boreca and Valle Terenzone valleys. Its summit is a tripoint at which the borders of the regions of Piedmont, Emilia-Romagna and Liguria meet.

== Hiking ==
Monte Carmo was crossed by the so-called "Lombard Salt Road", which from Pavia led to Torriglia and then to Genoa.
