= Ottone, Emilia-Romagna =

Ottone
- Comune
- Comune di Ottone
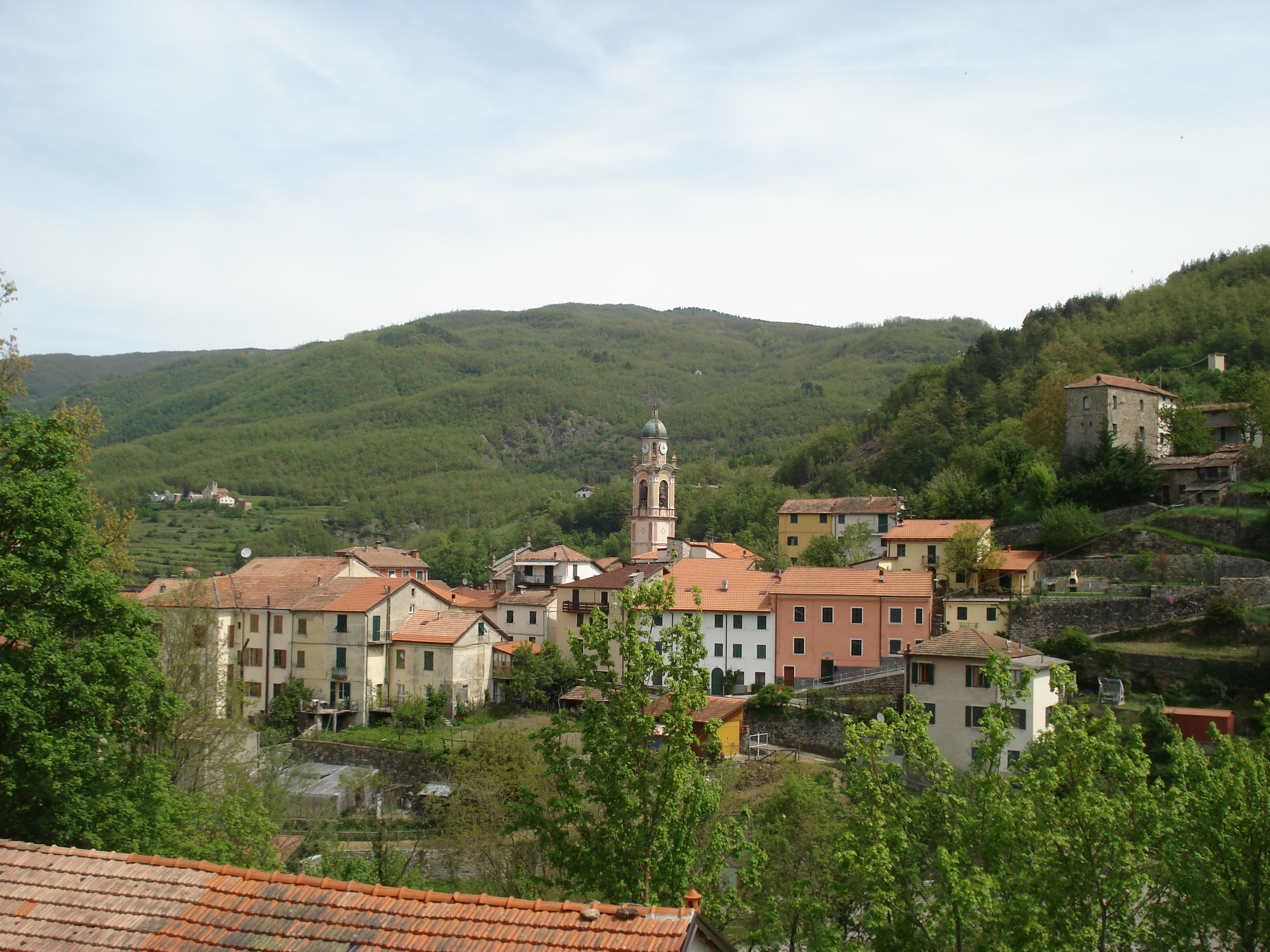
- Ottone

- Coat of arms

- Location within Italy Location within Emilia-Romagna
- Coordinates: 44°37′N 9°20′E
- Country: Italy
- Region: Emilia-Romagna
- Province: Piacenza (PC)
- Frazioni: Artana, Barchi, Belnome, Bertassi, Bertone, Bogli, Campi, Cattribiasca, Croce, Fabbrica, Frassi, Gramizzola, La Cà, Losso, Moglia, Monfagiano, Orezzoli là, Orezzoli qua, Ottone Soprano, Pizzonero, Rettagliata, Santa Maria, Semensi, Strassera, Suzzi, Tartago, Toveraia, Traschio, Truzzi, Valsigiara

Government
  - Mayor: Federico Beccia

Area
  - Total: 98.41 km^{2} (38.00 sq mi)
- Elevation: 510 m (1,670 ft)

Population (1 January 2016)
  - Total: 516
  - Density: 5.24/km^{2} (13.6/sq mi)
- Demonym: Ottonesi
- Time zone: UTC+1 (CET)
  - Summer (DST): UTC+2 (CEST)
- Postal code: 29026
- Dialing code: 0523
- Patron saint: St. Bartholomew
- Saint day: August 24
- Website: Official website

Ottone (Ligurian: Utùn; Piacentino: Uton) is a comune (municipality) in the Province of Piacenza in the Italian region Emilia-Romagna, located about 160 kilometres (99 mi) west of Bologna and about 60 kilometres (37 mi) southwest of Piacenza, in the upper Val Trebbia on the Ligurian Apennine. Ottone is the westernmost comune of Emilia-Romagna. The Mount Alfeo is located in its territory.

Pietro Toscanini, great-grandfather of Arturo Toscanini, was born in the Bogli borgo of Ottone, on 19 May 1769.
