= Monte delle Tre Croci =

Mountain in Italy

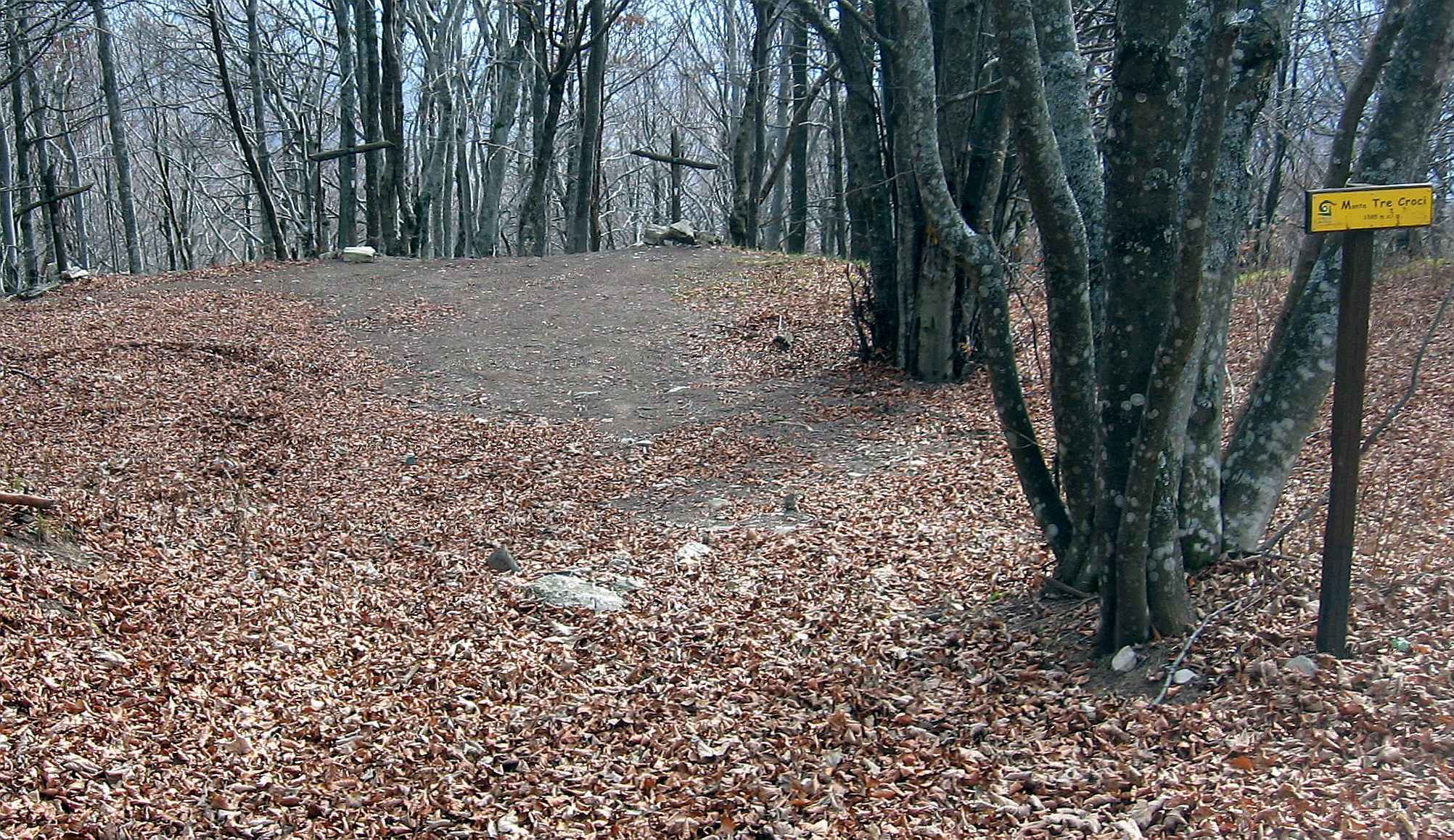
- The mountain's top

Highest point
- Elevation: 1,565 m (5,135 ft)
- Coordinates: 44.5866°N 9.1725°E

Geography
- Location within Italy
- Location: Liguria and Piedmont, Italy
- Parent range: Ligurian Apennines

Monte delle Tre Croci is a mountain on the border between Liguria and Piedmont, northern Italy, part of the Ligurian Apennines. It has a summit elevation of 1,565 metres.
