= Travo =

- Comune
- Comune di Travo
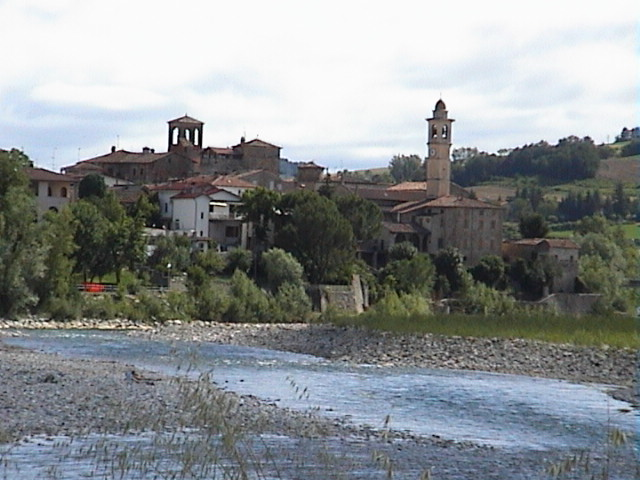

- Travo within the Province of Piacenza

- Location within Italy Location within Emilia-Romagna
- Coordinates: 44°52′N 9°33′E
- Country: Italy
- Region: Emilia-Romagna
- Province: Piacenza (PC)
- Frazioni: Bobbiano, Caverzago, Cernusca, Donceto, Due Bandiere, Fellino, Fiorano, Marchesi, Pigazzano, Pillori, Quadrelli, Scrivellano, Statto, Viserano

Government
  - Mayor: Roberta Valla

Area
  - Total: 80.4 km^{2} (31.0 sq mi)
- Elevation: 171 m (561 ft)

Population (31 December 2017)
  - Total: 2,121
  - Density: 26.4/km^{2} (68.3/sq mi)
- Demonym: Travesi
- Time zone: UTC+1 (CET)
  - Summer (DST): UTC+2 (CEST)
- Postal code: 29020
- Dialing code: 0523
- Website: Official website

Travo (Piacentino: Träv [træːv]) is a comune (municipality) in the Province of Piacenza in the Italian region Emilia-Romagna, located about 150 kilometres (93 mi) northwest of Bologna and about 25 kilometres (16 mi) southwest of Piacenza. It is on the left bank of the Trebbia river.

== Geography ==
Travo borders the following municipalities: Alta Val Tidone, Bettola, Bobbio, Coli, Gazzola, Piozzano, Rivergaro and Vigolzone.

== See also ==
- Parcellara Stone
