= Parcellara Stone =

Mountain in Emilia-Romagna, Italy

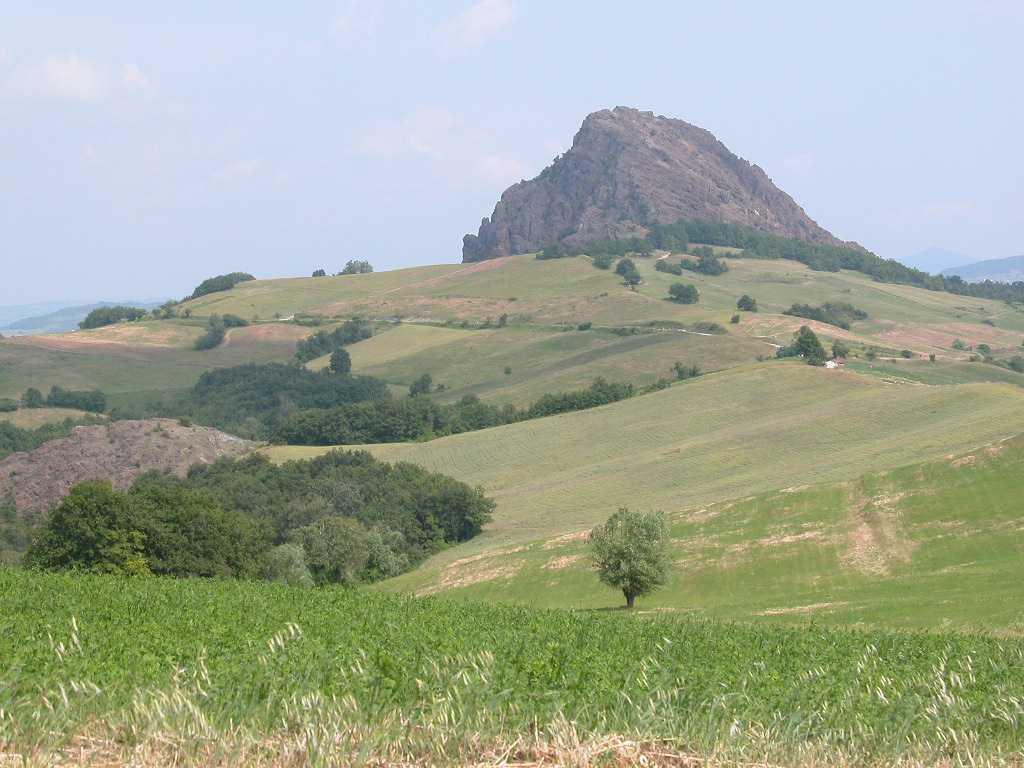

Highest point
- Elevation: 836 m (2,743 ft)
- Coordinates: 44.84408°N 9.47567°E

Geography
- Location within Italy
- Location: Emilia-Romagna, Piacenza, Italy
- Parent range: Ligurian Apennines

Parcellara Stone (Italian: Pietra Parcellara) is a mountain in the Ligurian Apennines located in the Trebbia Valley on the border between the comuni of Bobbio, to which the southwestern slope belongs, and Travo, to which the northeastern slope belongs, in the province of Piacenza.

A black serpentine ophiolite, although not particularly high (836 m a.s.l.), it dominates the surrounding hills from which it juts out abruptly, standing out in morphology, color and grandeur. Together with the nearby Pietra Perduca, it is part of the Pietra Parcellara and Pietra Perduca SCI-SAC site. It allows, from its summit, a panoramic view of the Dorba di Bobbiano valley and the lower Trebbia valley to the north, the middle Trebbia valley with the Bobbio basin and Monte Penice to the southwest, and the Perino valley to the southeast.

At the foot of the stone, in the municipal territory of Bobbio, there is an oratory dedicated to Our Lady of Caravaggio, located near the locality of Brodo and attached to the parish church of Mezzano Scotti.

== Geology ==
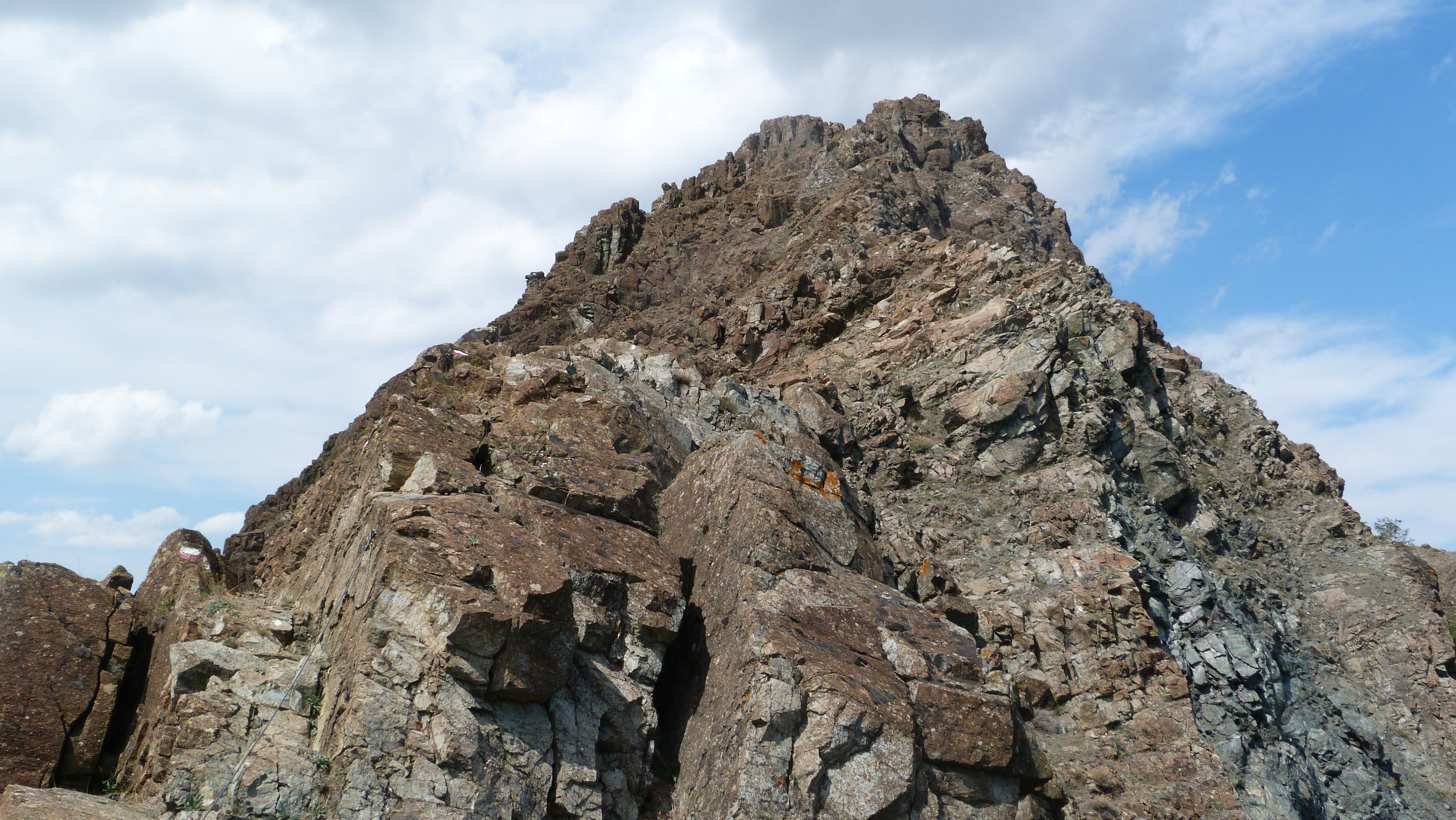
View of the south ridge

It is a flap of the Earth's mantle, serpentine in nature, due to the alteration of femic and ultrafemic minerals constituting the oceanic lithosphere of the Tethys Ocean, ended up on the bottom of the Piemont-Liguria Ocean before its closure, which occurred about 200 million years ago, as a result of a submarine landslide (olistostrome) that affected a relief set on the mantle that constituted the ocean floor. This flap was thus incorporated, as an olistolite, into the geological formation, rich in clay component, that was being deposited on the bottom at that time., which is known by the name of chaotic complex or Parcellara Stone complex

Once the Apennine relief was created, the processes of meteoric degradation and the action of runoff waters led the hard serpentine mass to emerge, due to the phenomenon of differential erosion, leading it to dominate the surrounding landscape, which is composed mainly of flaky clays.

== History ==
On the mountain formerly called Prescigliera, a monastic castrum was formed in Lombard times, included in the possessions of the Bobbio Abbey and grew in importance with the construction of the Prescigliera castle and the nearby chapel. Also attested in the area are the estates of Travo-Caverzago, Stazzano, Murlo and others such as Prescigliera (Pietra Parcellara), S.Anna (ant. S.Michele) della Perduca, S. Andrea, S. Maria, Signano, Fellino, Fiorano, Mezzanello, Pigazzano, Bobbiano, Denavolo, Chiosi, Quadrelli, Scarniago, Statto, Viserano.

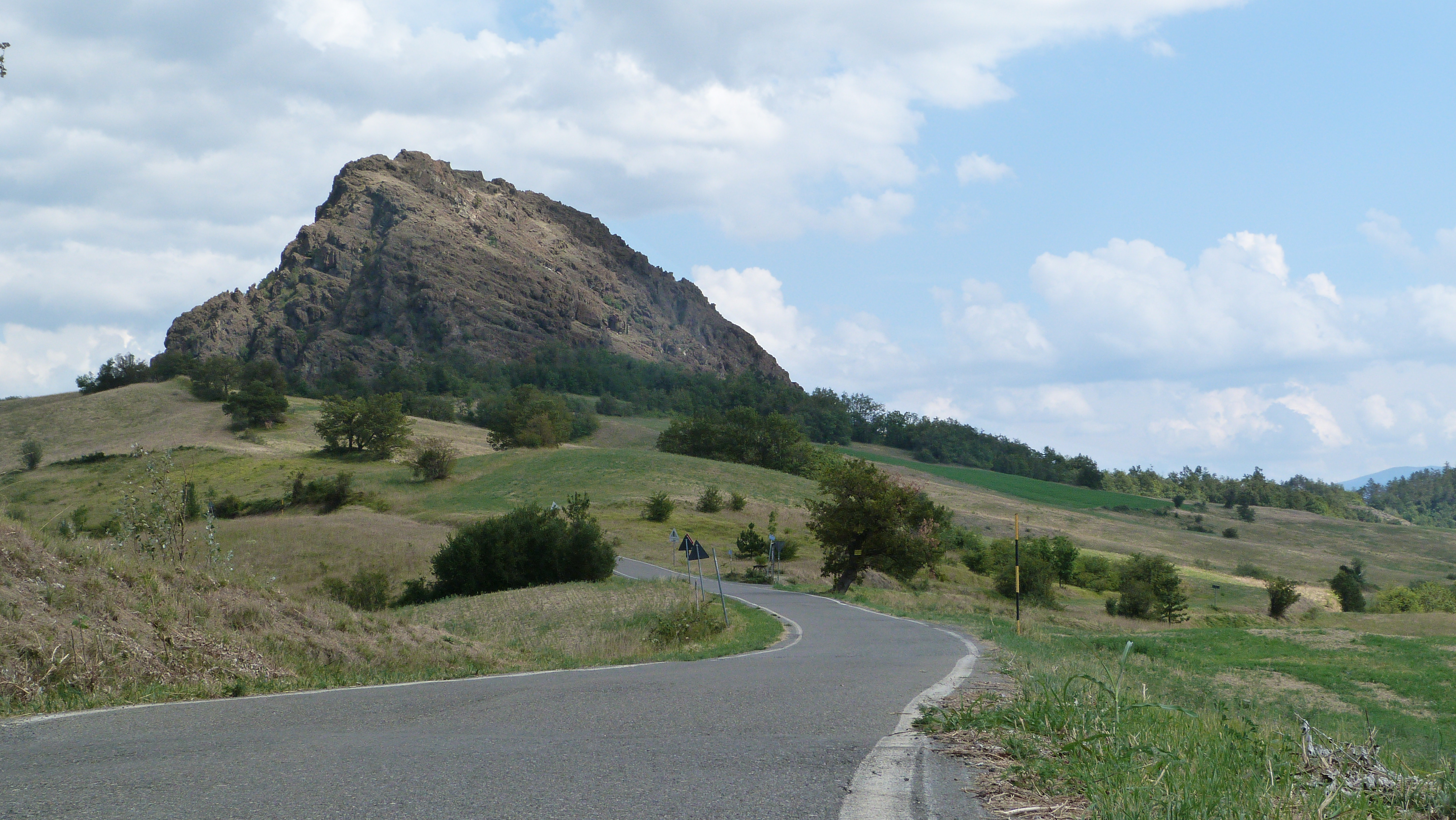
View of the southern slope from provincial road 68

It later became part of the possessions of the monastery of San Paolo di Mezzano Scotti, later passing to the Malaspina family at an unspecified time. In 1120 Piacenza and Guelph troops occupied the area in the course of the war waged against the Bobbiese Ghibellines, however, the Malaspinas managed to resist and later reoccupy the area. In 1155 it was ceded by the Malaspinas to the noble Perducca family, who were already feudal lords of the nearby Pietra Perduca, which was also fortified and had a castle.

In 1164 Barbarossa granted the Malaspina family investiture over several fiefs located in the Trebbia valley; among them they were granted, perhaps erroneously, ownership of the fief of Pietrasilaria, which was eventually regranted to Oberto da Perducca. In 1170 the area of Pietra Parcellara was again attacked by Guelph troops from Piacenza, who laid siege to the castle; at the end of the battle, during which a nephew of Oberto da Perduca was killed, after months of fighting, the Guelph militias were forced to retreat. In 1269 the commune of Piacenza succeeded in occupying the neighboring territories, including the fiefdom of Parcellara and the castle, which would, therefore, be completely destroyed, despite the protests of the bishop of Bobbio. Following this, Pietra Parcellara, along with the area of Mezzano Scotti and the local monastery, became part of the bishop's county of Piacenza.

With the creation of municipalities in the Napoleonic era, Pietra Parcellara, following the fate of Mezzano Scotti, was entirely included in the municipal territory of Travo to which it remained until the passage of the southern part under the municipality of Bobbio in 1927, at the same time as the detachment of the Mezzano Scotti area from the municipality of Travo and its inclusion in the municipality of Bobbio.

== Access ==
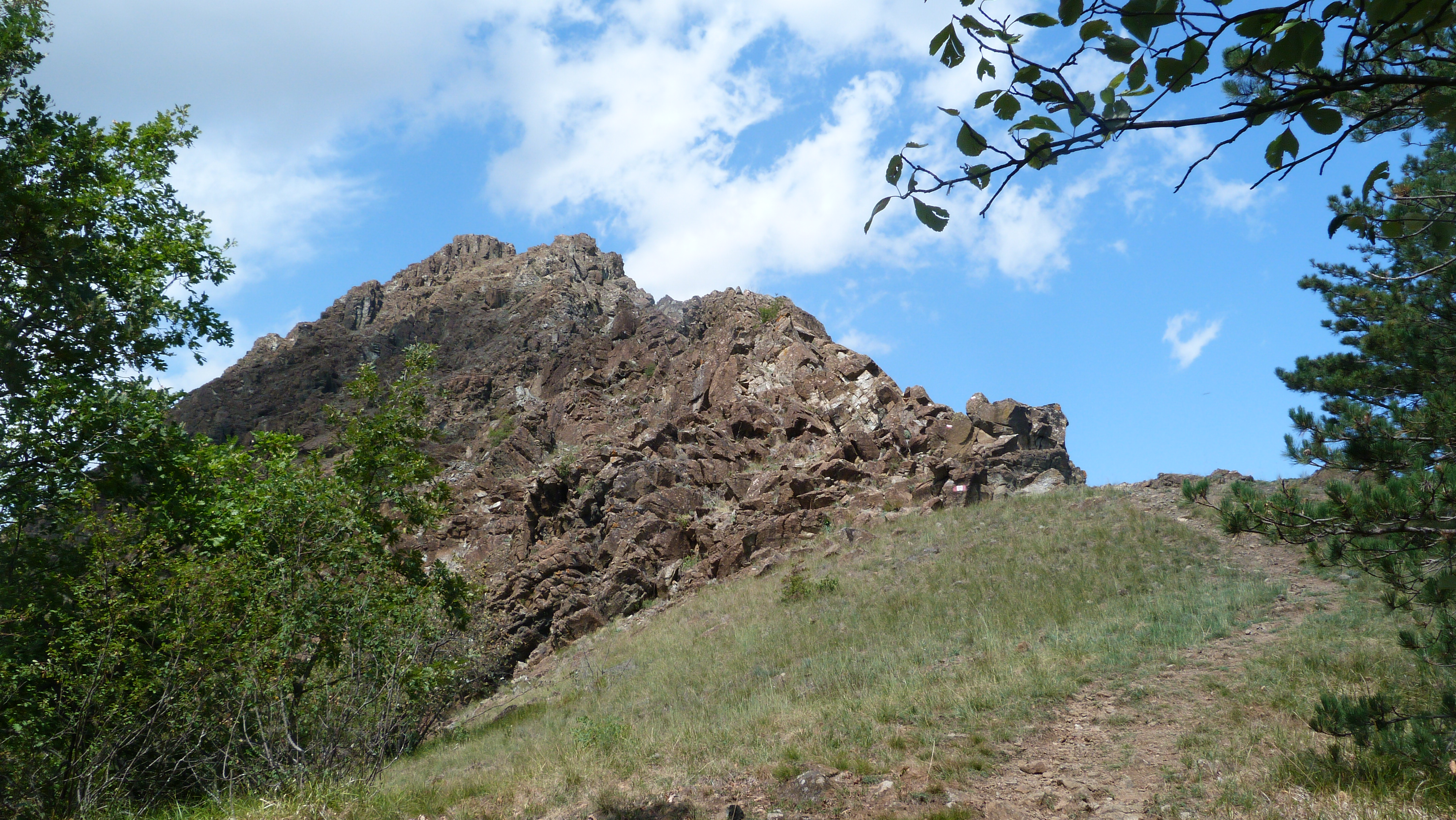
Full view on the south ridge

One can reach the foot of the mountain via two paved roads: the provincial road 68 of Bobbiano, which allows access from the north, from Travo, passing through the village of Chiosi di Bobbiano, and from the south, from the Caldarola Pass, and a communal road that climbs from Perino, village of Coli, passing through Donceto, village of Travo, and Brodo, village of Bobbio, from which a path marked with CAI trail markers branches off to reach the summit, until it rejoins the provincial road 68 south of the relief.

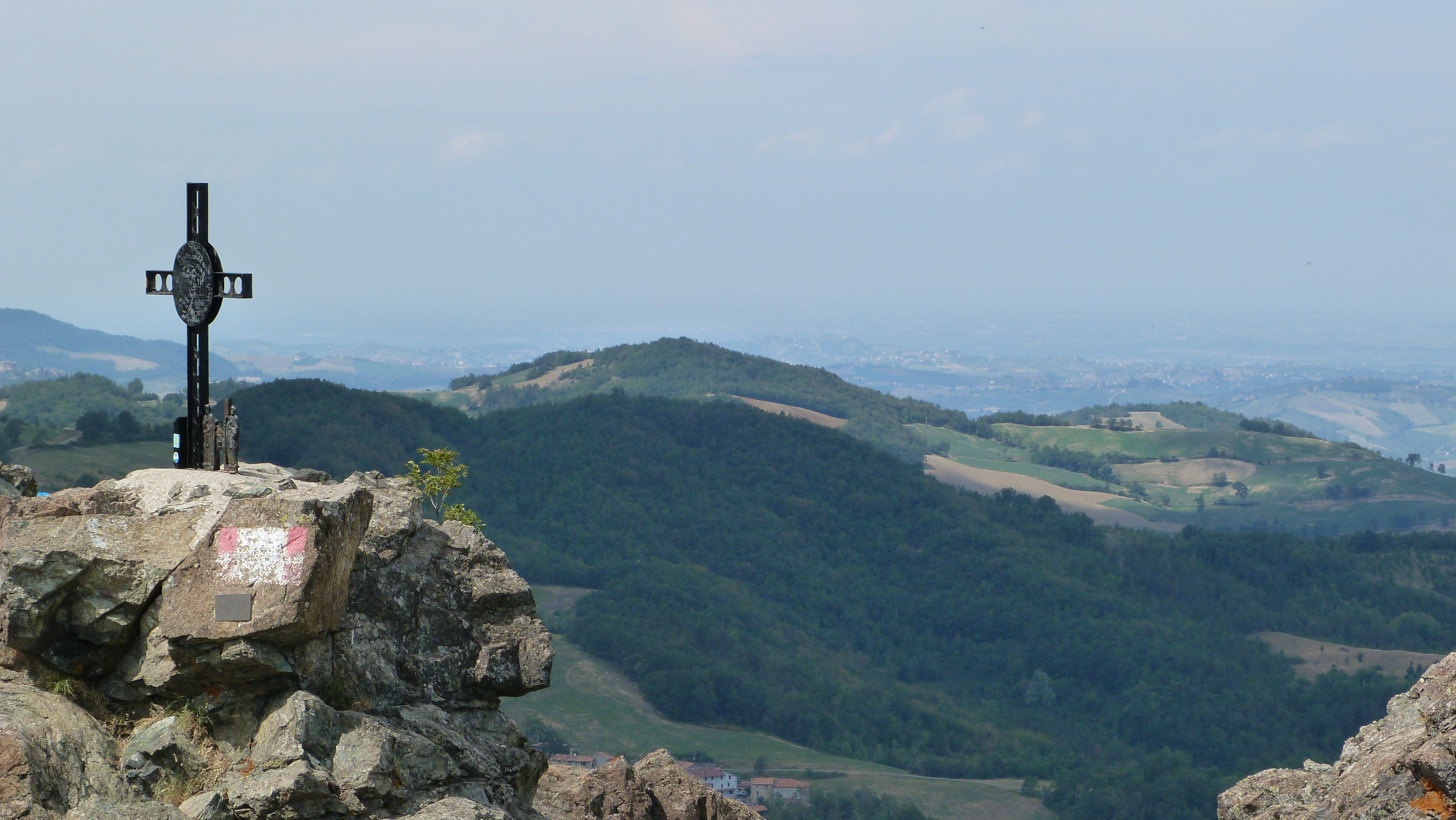
View from the summit

The summit can be reached via two accesses, located southeast and northwest of the relief, respectively:

- From Brodo (southeast slope):

The summit can be reached from the south by the CAI 169 trail, which branches off from the paved municipal road just before the village of Brodo; the trail reaches, after increasing its altitude by crossing first an oak forest and then a coniferous forest, the pass that divides Pietra Parcellara from Pietra Marcia. From this point the ascent becomes more challenging due to the presence of several rocky ledges to overcome; the route is constantly on or near the ridge and has no natural protection on the sheer walls. Before reaching the summit there is a vertical wall to descend, an action facilitated by the presence of a steel cable.

- From the Oratory of Our Lady of Caravaggio (northwest slope):

The path, equipped with CAI trail markers, starts near the Oratory of the Madonna of Caravaggio, located at about 730 m above sea level, and, from the forest in which the religious building is located, it quickly comes out into the open on a rocky section located on the west ridge of the relief, and then continues towards the summit, which can be reached in about 20 minutes.

== See also ==
- Apennine Mountains
- Bobbio
- Travo
- Province of Piacenza

== Bibliography ==
- Carmen Artocchini (1967). Castelli piacentini. Piacenza: TEP.
- Leonardo Cafferini. Guida turistica "Piacenza e la sua provincia" - Travo.
- Codice Diplomatico di San Colombano di Bobbio. Vol. I.
- Codice Diplomatico di San Colombano di Bobbio. Vol. II.
- Eleonora Destefanis. Il Monastero Di Bobbio in Eta Altomedievale.
- Valeria Polonio Felloni. Il monastero di San Colombano di Bobbio dalla fondazione all'epoca carolingia.
- SIC IT4010005 Pietra Parcellara e Pietra Perduca - Quadro conoscitivo (PDF). January 2018.
- Michele Tosi (1978). Bobbio - Guida storica artistica e ambientale della città e dintorni. Archivi Storici Bobiensi.
