= Monte Antola =

Mountain in the Apennines in Italy

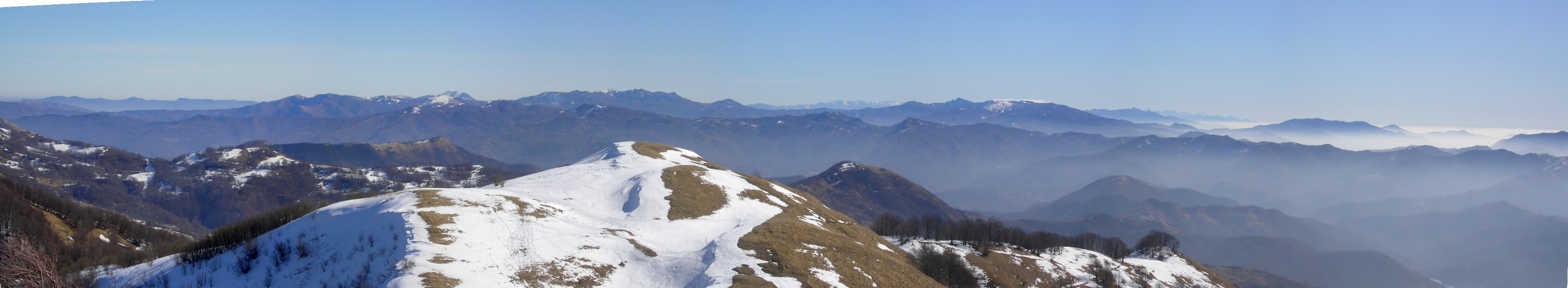

Highest point
- Elevation: 1,597 m (5,240 ft)
- Prominence: 230 m (750 ft)
- Coordinates: 44°34′28″N 09°08′59″E

Geography
- Location within Italy
- Location: Liguria and Piemonte, Italy
- Parent range: Ligurian Apennines

Monte Antola (in Ligurian munte Antua) is a mountain in Liguria, northern Italy, part of the Ligurian Apennines.

== Geography ==
The mountain is located between the provinces of Genoa and Alessandria. It lies at an altitude of 1597 metres. Close to the summit is located the Rifugio Parco Antola, a mountain hut built by the Ente Parco and managed by the Club Alpino Italiano. It can accommodate up to 32 hikers or alpinists.

== Access to the summit ==
Several footpaths meet on mount Antola starting from the surrounding valleys. Among them can be cited:

- the route from Bavastrelli (Propata), which reaches the summit in a couple of hours passing near the new mountain hut built by the natural park;
- the route from Caprile, another village of Propata municipality, which after the saddle near Monte delle Tre Croci reaches the summit following the Po Valley/Ligurian Sea water divide. It takes around 2.30 hours' walking;
- the route from Crocefieschi, through the Incisa pass, demanding more than 4 hours of walk;
- the route from Torriglia through monte Carmo (around 3 hours).

== Conservation ==
The southern side of the mountain since 1989 is included in the Parco naturale regionale dell'Antola.
