= Trebbia =

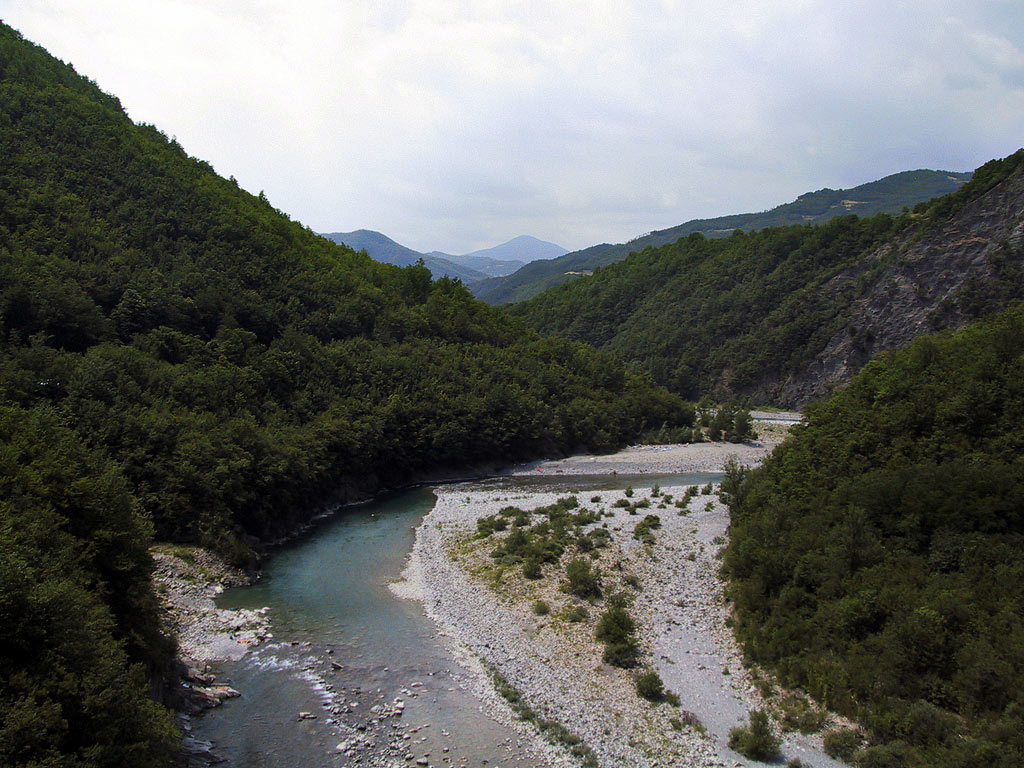
- The Trebbia valley in July, a few kilometres upstream from Bobbio

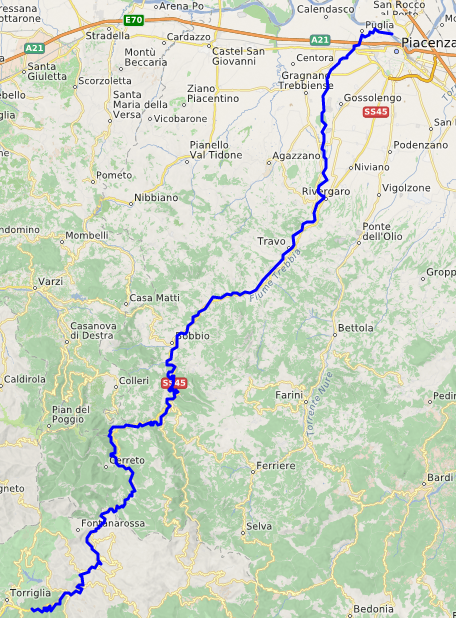
- Location of the Trebbia.

Location
- Country: Italy

Physical characteristics
- Source
  - location: Monte Prelà, Ligurian Apennines
  - elevation: 800 m (2,600 ft)
- Mouth: Po
  - location: just upstream from Piacenza
  - coordinates: 45.0702°N 9.6849°E
  - elevation: 61 m (200 ft)
- Length: 118 km (73 mi)
- Basin size: 1,150 km^{2} (440 mi^{2})
- Discharge
  - average: 40 m^{3}/s (1,400 cu ft/s)

Basin features
- Progression: Po→ Adriatic Sea

The Trebbia (stressed Trèbbia; Latin: Trebia) is a river predominantly of Liguria and Emilia Romagna in northern Italy. It is one of the four main right-bank tributaries of the river Po, the other three being the Tanaro, the Secchia and the Panaro.

Along its eastern banks in 218 BC was fought one of the great battles of the Second Punic War. In the Battle of Trebbia, Hannibal defeated a Roman consular army.

The 1,150-square-kilometre (440 mi^{2}) drainage basin is divided among Emilia Romagna, 770 square kilometres (300 mi^{2}), Liguria, 349 square kilometres (135 mi^{2}), and Lombardy, 31 square kilometres (12 mi^{2}). Its principal tributaries are the torrents Aveto and Perino (from the right) and the torrent Boreca (from the left).

== Geography ==
The source of the river, the Trebbia river spring, is in the Ligurian Apennines on the south slopes of Monte Prelà, to the south of Monte Antola in the comune of Torriglia, Province of Genoa. Monte Prelà, 1,407 m (4,616 ft) high, (Note: The other reference has 1,406 m (4,613 ft).) is part of the Antola massif.

The spring is not on the peak but is at roughly 800 m (2,600 ft). Across a small ridge to the west, on which sits Torriglia, and slightly further downslope is the source of the Scrivia river. Over a ridge to the northeast is the Brugneto reservoir, water supply for Genoa. The reservoir was created in 1959 by damming Brugneto stream, which formerly joined its waters to the Trebbia, but now only does so when the reservoir is full. A ridge running north from Prelà connects to Monte Druso, then to Monte Cremado, and finally to Monte Antola at 1,597 m (5,240 ft). From its peak on a clear day can be seen Genoa, Corsica, the Tuscan Archipelago and the Alps.

From its source the river flows towards north-east for 118 km (73 mi) (Note: The other reference has 105 km (65 mi).) until it reaches the Po just to the west of Piacenza. The Alta Val Trebbia ("High Trebbia Valley") includes the valley down to Bobbio. It straddles eight comuni of the Province of Genoa: Torriglia, Rondanina, Propata, Fascia, Montebruno, Rovegno, Fontanigorda and Gorreto. Each of these contains numerous hamlets, some on the river, most on the slopes. Gorreto is on the Ligurian side of the border with Piacenza province.

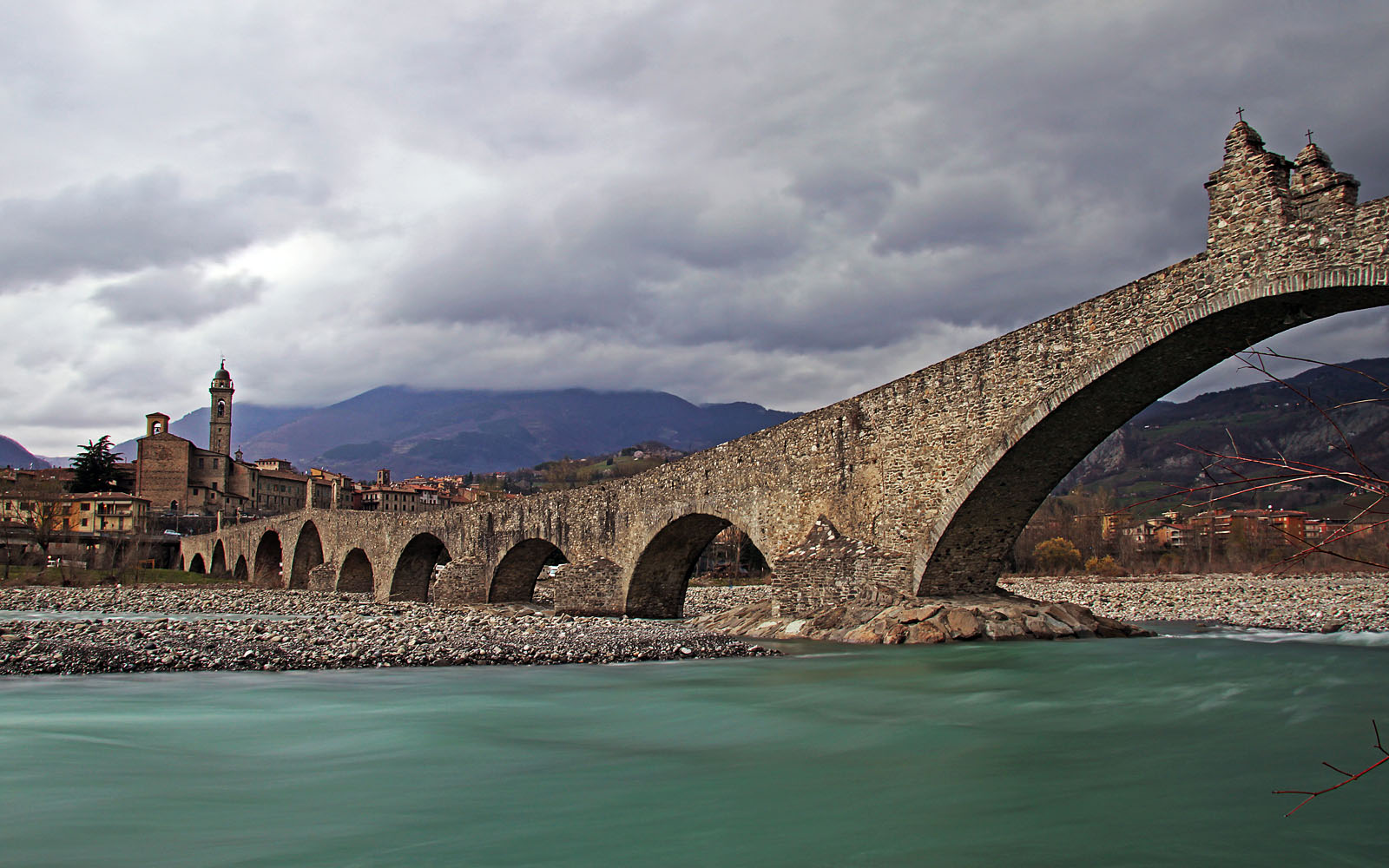
The Ponte Gobbo (‘hunchback bridge’) or Ponte Vecchio (‘old bridge’) is a Devil’s Bridge of 280 m (920 ft), which spans the river at Bobbio.

Past Gorreto the Trebbia flows under a few mountain villages arriving at the next town, Ottone. Below Ottone Val Boreca enters from the left opposite the frazione of Losso. The Boreca is a mountain brook falling from the heights of the "four provinces" region generally too small to be shown on maps but visible in satellite photographs. Just below Zerba (from which it is accessed) its waters are impounded by a dam diverting them through the turbines of a hydroelectric power station.

The border with the Province of Pavia in southernmost Lombardy follows the Trebbia for about 2,000 m (6,600 ft) where it bends around Ponte Organasco, so that some of the river and bottom lands are in Lombardy. Further downstream the valley opens to accommodate Corte Brugnatella and then closes to form steep sides again. Receiving the Torrente Carlone from the left it enters Bobbio on the left bank. Here the high valley ends and the valley becomes the Val Trebbia.

The river goes on under a good many small communities located up on the flanks of the hills before reaching the next good-sized town on it, Travo, and then Rivergaro. Here the val ends. It widens and merges with the Pianura Padana, "plain of the Po", beyond Rivergaro and a few miles later encounters the suburban communities on the west side of Piacenza before entering the Po. Geologically the course of the lower Trebbia and that of the Po is unstable except where stabilized by man.

Nearly the whole course of the river is paralleled by the Strada statale della Val Trebbia, highway SS45, running between Piacenza and Genoa. It encounters the river at Rivergaro and winds with it through the mountains, breaking away just below the source to bend southwest over the ridges to Genoa.

== Ecology ==
=== Flora ===
The following trees are predominant in the forests of Val Trebbia: Fagus silvatica at 800 m (2,600 ft) to 1,500 m (4,900 ft); over 1500 m: Sorbus aucuparia, Sorbus aria, Laburnum anagyroides, Acer pseudoplatanus, Abies alba, Larix decidua, Alnus incana, Populus tremula; below 1,000 m (3,300 ft): Quercus cerris, Quercus sessiflora, Quercus pubescens, Ostrya carpinifolia, Carpinus betulus, Fraxinus ornus, Acer campestre, Ulmus campestris, Populus alba, Populus canescens, Alnus glutinosa, Prunus avium, Pirus communis, Malus communis, Corylus avellana; below 800 m (2,600 ft): Castanea sativa.

The shrubbery includes the following species: Juniperus communis, Rubus fruticosus, Rubus idaeus, Polygala chamaebuxus, Daphne mezereum, Vaccinium myrtillus, Cornus mas, Euonymus europaea, Cytisus sessilifolius, Erica arborea, Ruscus aculeatus, Clematis vitalba, Lonicera caprifolium, Crataegus oxyacantha, Rosa canina, Spartium junceum.

The ferns are Polypodium volgare, Asplenium ruta-muraria, Dryopteris filix-mas, Pteridium aquilinum, Notholaena marantae.

=== Fauna ===
The Val Trebbia is within the endemic range of Moltoni's warbler, a subspecies of Sylvia cantillans better known in the western Mediterranean islands. The birds forage for insects in mixed shrubland of varying heights and both broad-leaved and coniferous composition.

The other birds include Buteo buteo, Falco tinnunculus, Accipiter nisus, Pernis apivorus, Cinclus cinclus, Charadrius dubius, Motacilla alba, Motacilla flava, Alcedo atthis, Alectoris rufa and Picus viridis.

== Geologic history ==
The northern Apennines are a belt of northeast-southwest mountains on the coast of northwest Italy folded by transverse thrusting from sedimentary rock. The streams draining it run primarily in a northeastern direction perpendicular to the line of the folds and project into the Po river an average of 50 km (31 mi) from the source. The eroded landscape of the north Apennines covers about 2,800 km^{2} (1,100 sq mi).

For much of their lengths, these heavily braided streams run through montane terrain that is minimally developed, is known for its wildlife, and remains in a pristine state. The sediment eroded from the mountains is deposited in alluvial fans and terraces in the Po valley, which is heavily populated and in ancient times flooded regularly. Diking has prevented much of the flooding but now due to confinement of deposition within the stream beds significant lengths of stream run entirely above ground, in places as high as the rooftops. This is a development of the previous thousand years.

The native rock differs between the two banks. On the left is mainly sedimentary rock, the Monte Antola limestone, which is actually a marlstone. On the right is both sedimentary and metamorphic rock: ophiolite, serpentinite, basalt, jasper.

Val Trebbia is covered with a blanket of rich soil reddish or brown in color from hematite an average of 4 m (13 ft) deep. It consists of loess deposited in layers during periods of glacial maxima beginning about 400000 years ago in the Middle Pleistocene. The loess initially accumulated on gravelled terraces deriving from native rock.

== Cultural history ==
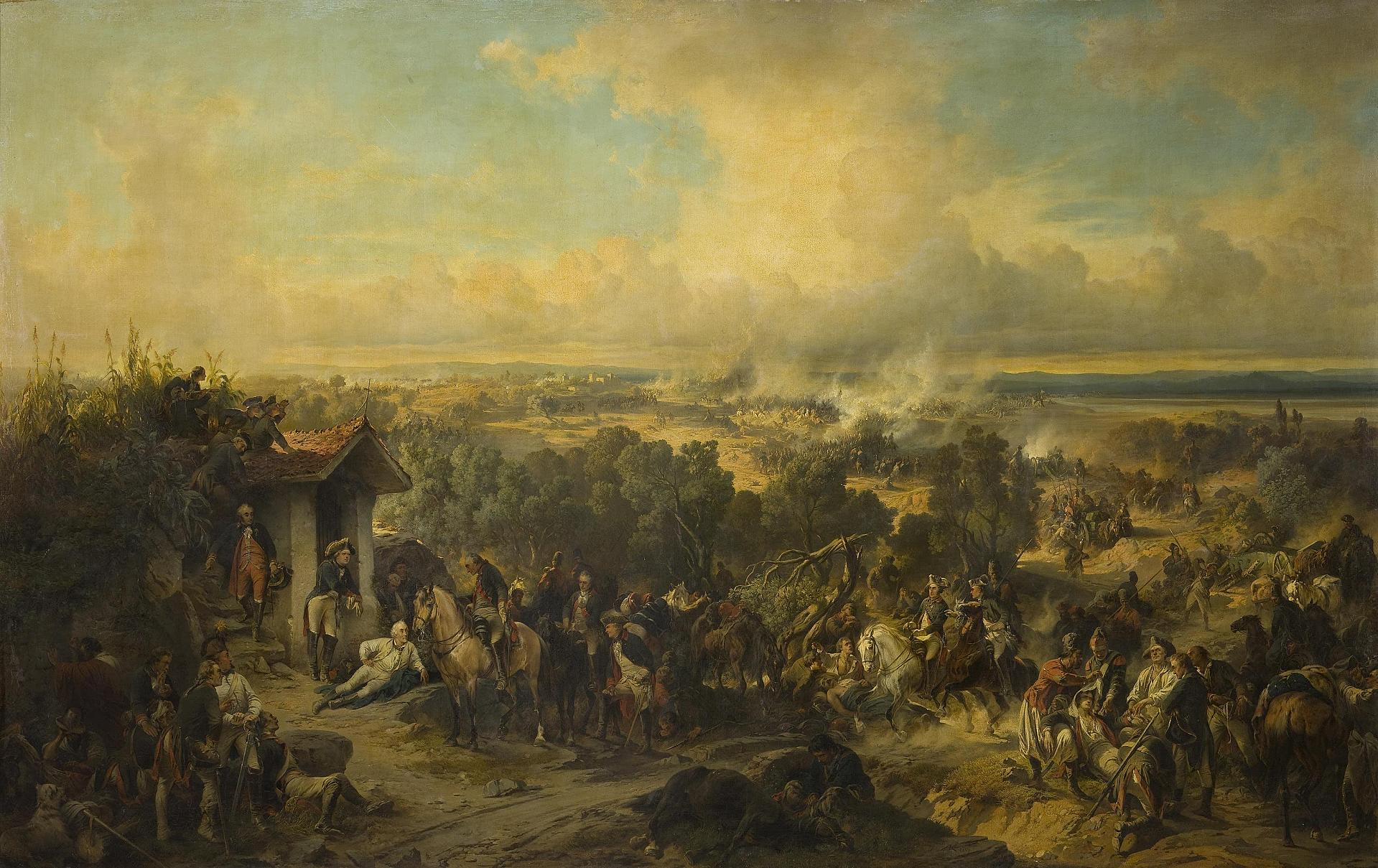
Battle of the Trebbia on 19 June 1799 (Alexander Kotzebue, 1857)

Judging from the archaeological evidence, the Trebbia valley has been continuously occupied since the end of the Acheulian in the Paleolithic, about 150000 years ago. In the Mesolithic various summer camps for high-altitude hunting were located in the valley. Neolithic cultures were at first diverse (4500 BC). Later in the Neolithic, at about 4000 BC, the Square-mouthed pottery culture began to prevail; at about 3000 BC, the Chassey-Lagozza culture of the Chalcolithic. The Bronze Age population resided in settlements located at positions with natural defenses. Etruscan elements began in the Iron Age, about the 5th century BC. Celtic artifacts immediately preceded the Roman presence.

Along its eastern banks in 218 BC was fought one of the battles of the Second Punic War: the Battle of Trebbia, where Hannibal defeated a Roman consular army.

The name of the river is first known from Polybius, who wrote in the middle Roman Republic, but used materials dating to earlier. Which people first assigned it and during which period remains unclear. Without knowing the probable language the few etymologies are highly speculative.

In 1799 a major battle between the Russians and Austrians under Suvorov with the French took place here.

== Gallery ==
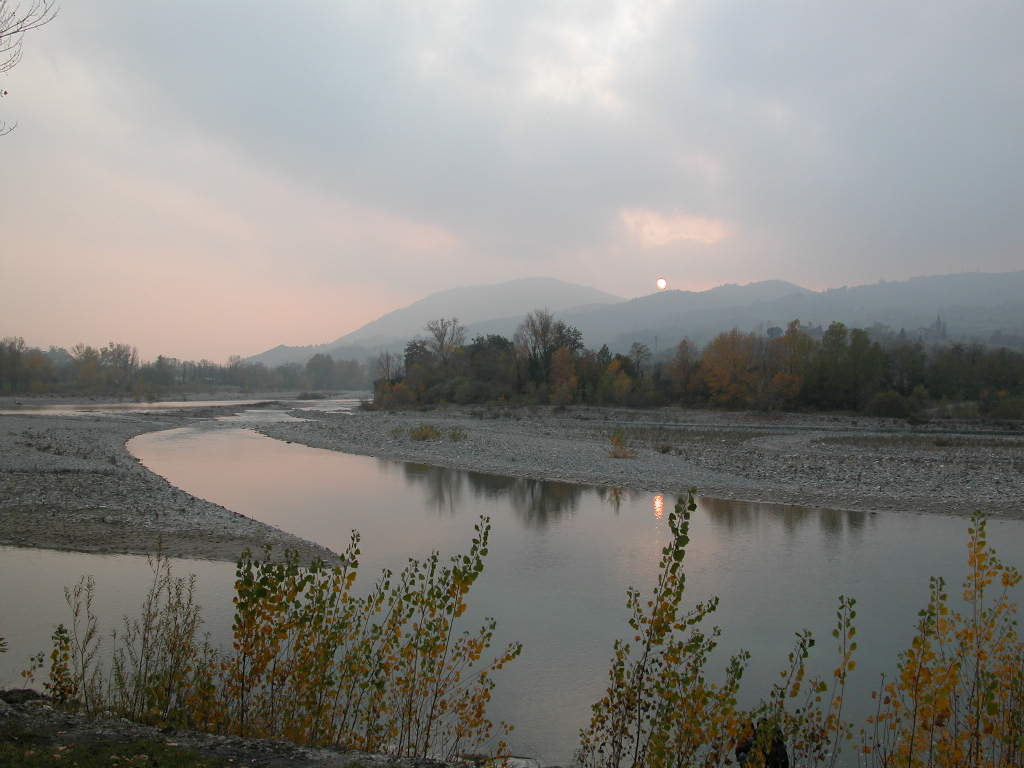
At Rivergaro.

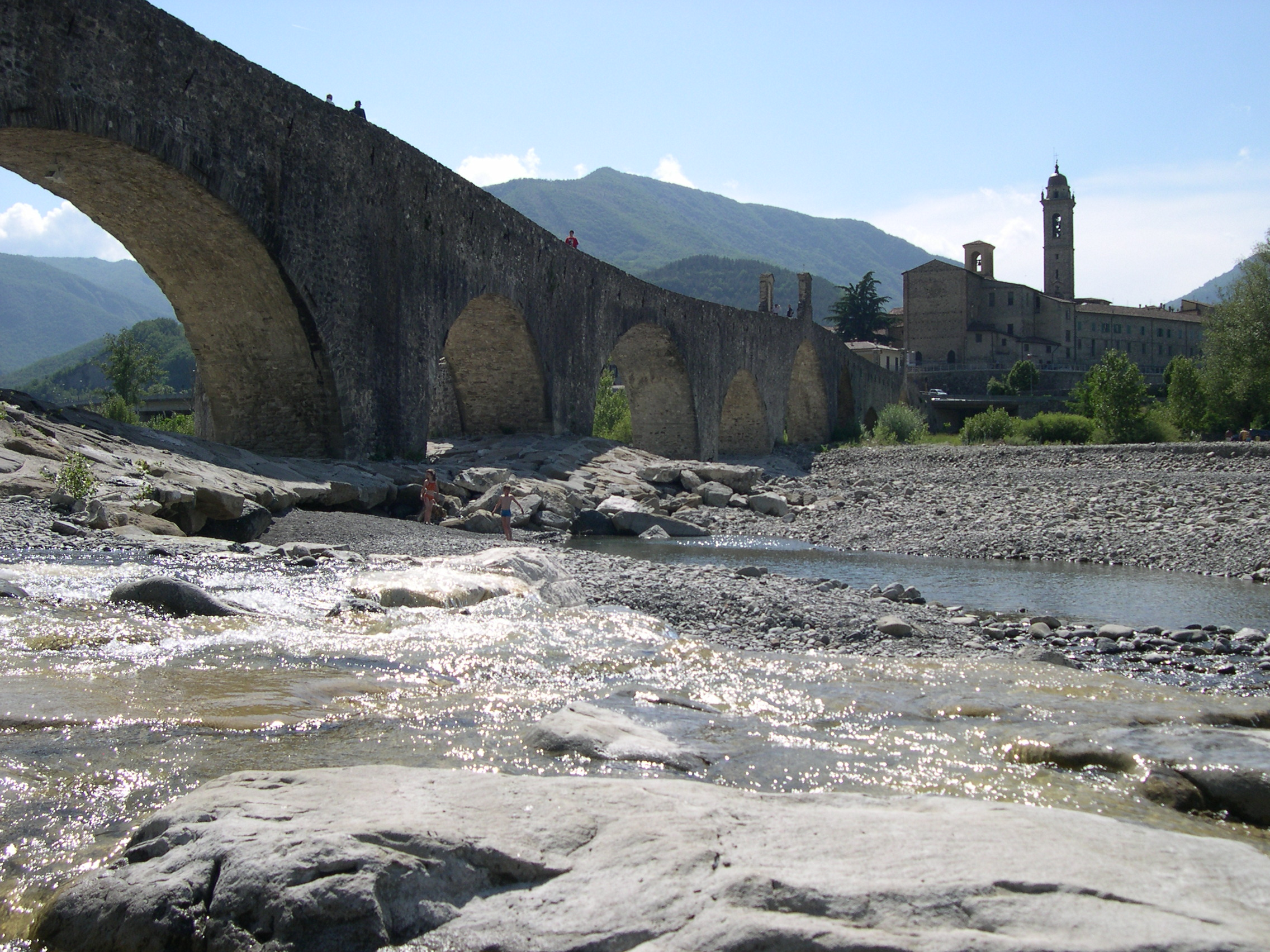
At Bobbio.

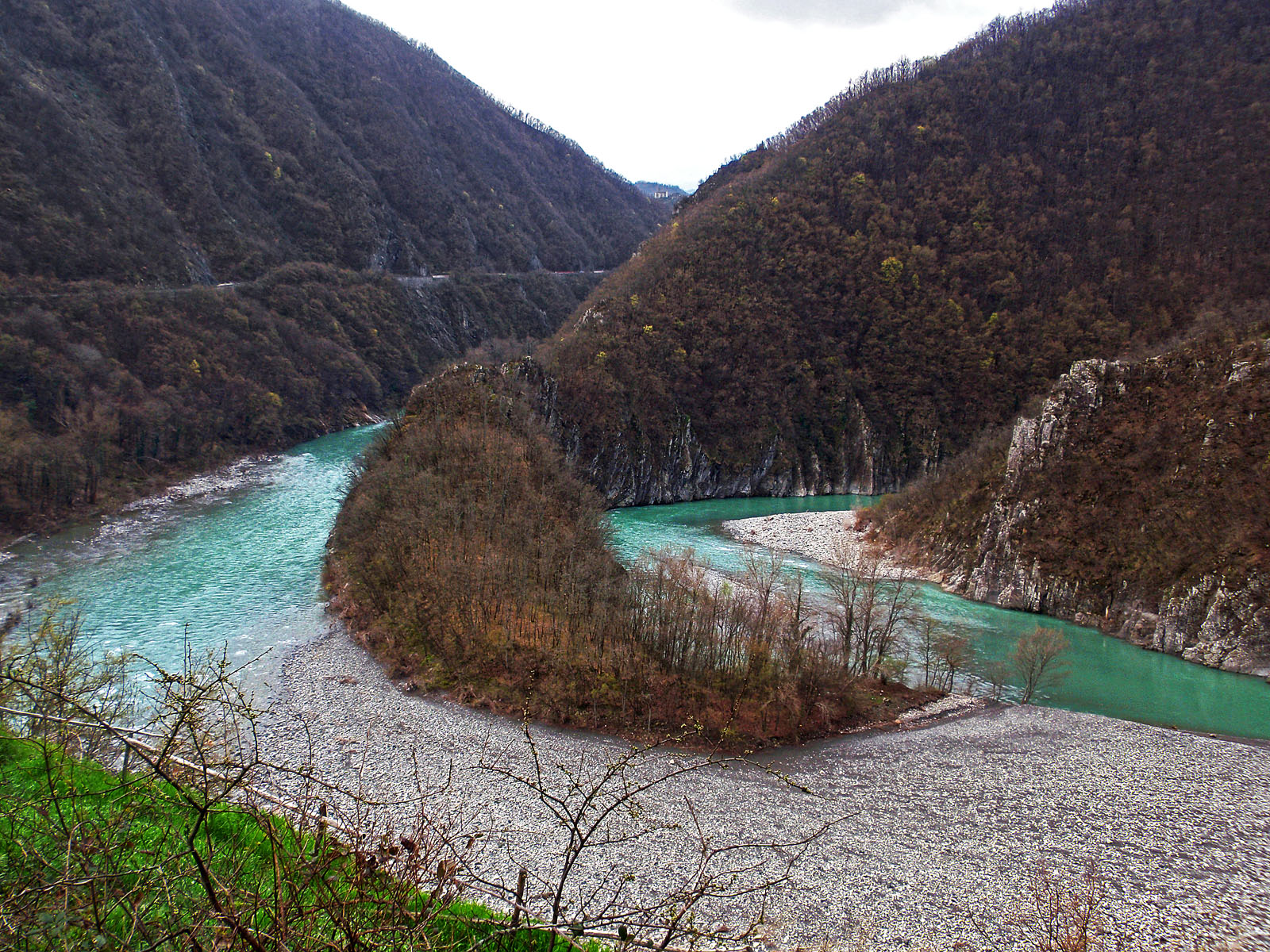
Meanders at San Salvatore

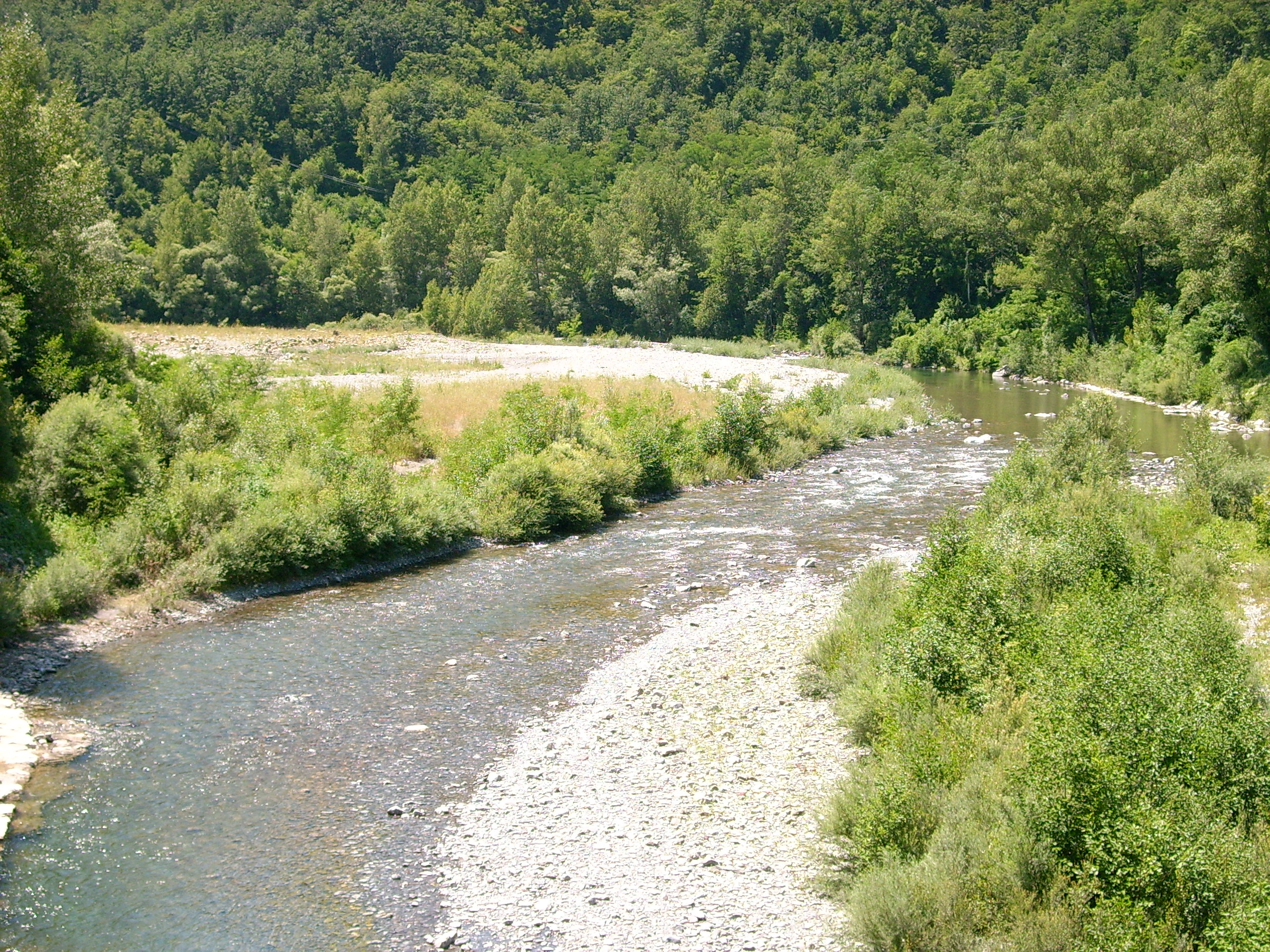
At Gorreto.
