= San Savino, Piacenza =

Ancient basilica in Piacenza, Italy

- Basilica di San Savino
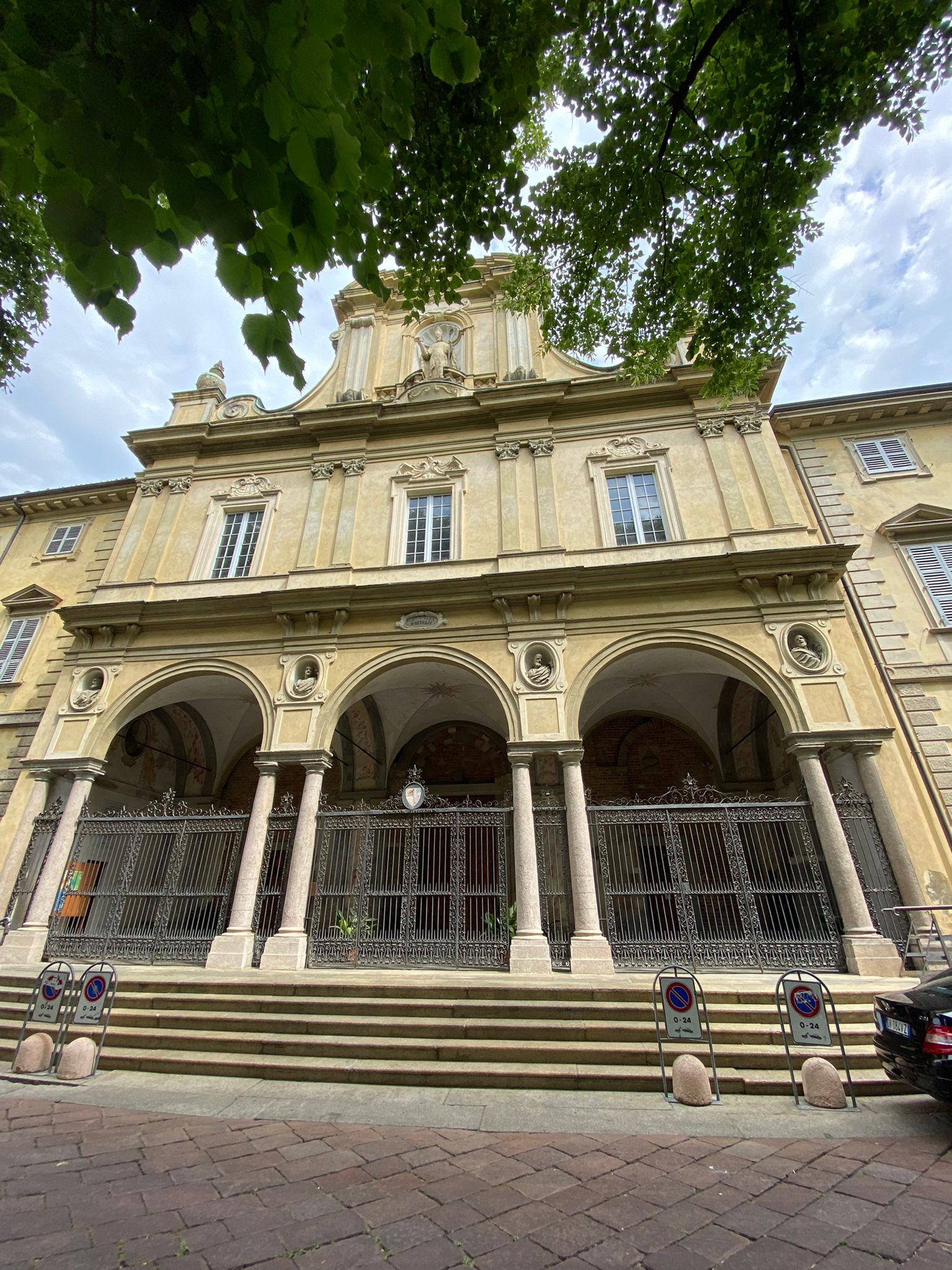
- Main façade of San Savino

- Location within Italy

Religion
- Affiliation: Roman Catholic
- Diocese: Diocese of Piacenza-Bobbio

Location
- Location: Via Giulio Alberoni 31, Piacenza, Emilia-Romagna, Italy
- State: Italy
- Interactive map of San Savino, Piacenza
- Coordinates: 45.0504°N 9.7016°E

Architecture
- Completed: 11th – 12th century

The Basilica of San Savino is an ancient Roman Catholic basilica in the city of Piacenza in the Province of Piacenza, Italy. It is dedicated to Saint Sabinus of Piacenza, second bishop of the city.

== History ==
San Savino was established as a Benedictine monastery in 903, located outside the then city walls. Much of Piacenza, and likely the original church here was ravaged by the Hungarian invasions in the early 900s. The attached church was initially dedicated to the twelve apostles, but Sabinus himself was buried here. The original construction appears to have been poor. In February 998, Pope Gregory V confirmed its right to freely elect its abbots. It was rebuilt by Bishop Sigifredo in 1005. The present layout is due to an 1107 reconstruction with later modifications, although it includes a few elements from the 903 edifice. The monastery of San Savino is mentioned in a 1132 bull of Innocent II The crypt of the church has 12th-century mosaics depicting the zodiac signs on a marine background. An ecclesiastical historian in 1651 describes a mosaic labyrinth in the church. The presbytery has a contemporary mosaic showing battle scenes and a depiction of Christ.

In the 1500s, the church became property of the Hieronymite order, who reconstructed it. They remained in the monastery until 1810. In the 17th century, the church interior was decorated in a Baroque style, hiding much of the original Romanesque details. In 1631, the apse had a new choir installed. The nave was refurbished in 1687. In 1721, the present facade was built. Among the works of art in the church is a wooden crucifix and frescos from the 12th century and a 15th-century fresco in the presbytery depicting an Enthroned Madonna and child.

In 1819, the hospice for "orphans and the exposed" (Ospizio degli Orfani ed Esposti) with 60 children was moved to the Girolamini monastery attached to San Savino. The hospice had been founded in 1573 by the then bishop, and run by the Somaschi order of clerics regular. They were affiliated with the parish church of San Stefano. The orphanage had been housed in the convent of Sant'Anna.

== Gallery ==
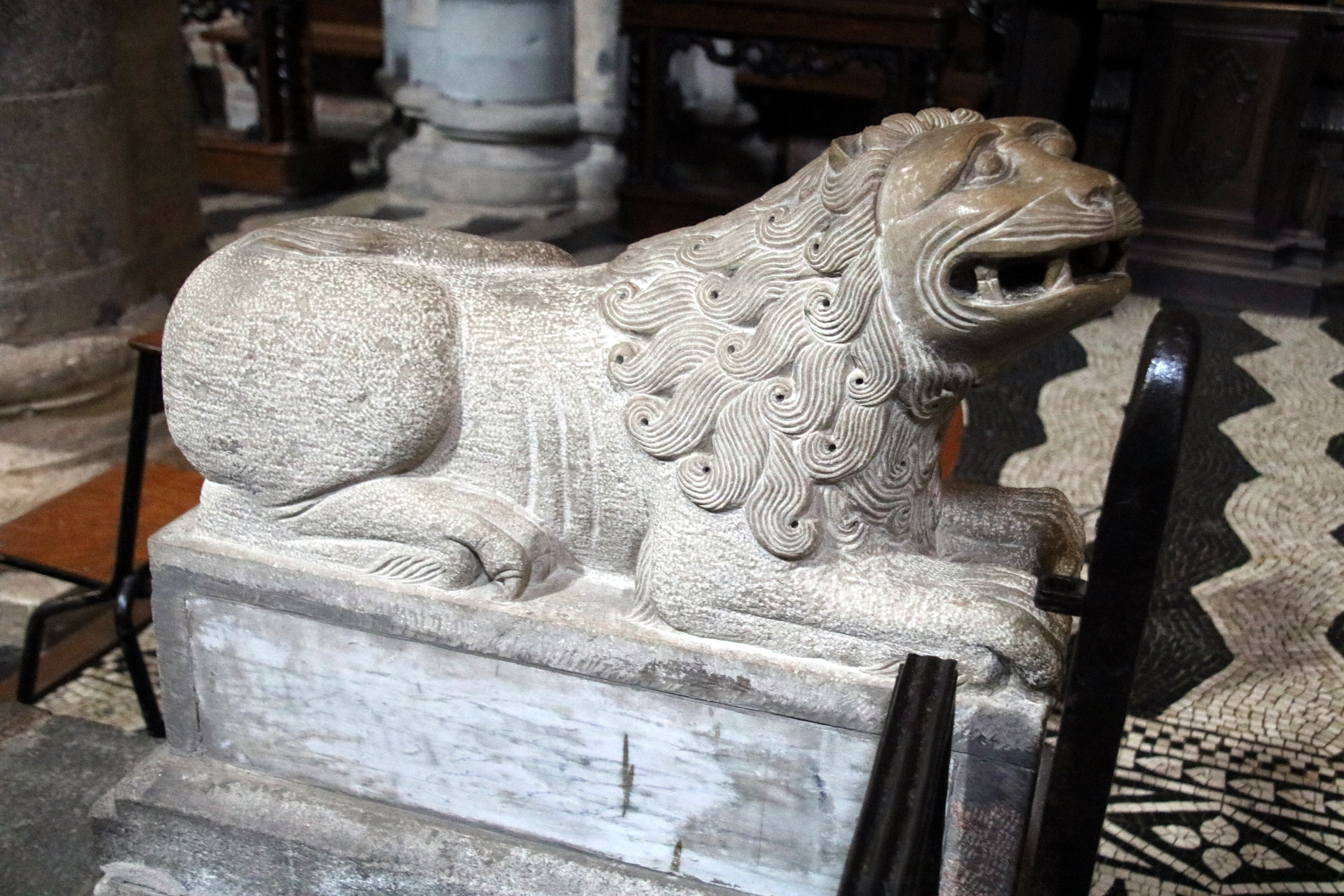
Romanesque Lion sculpture

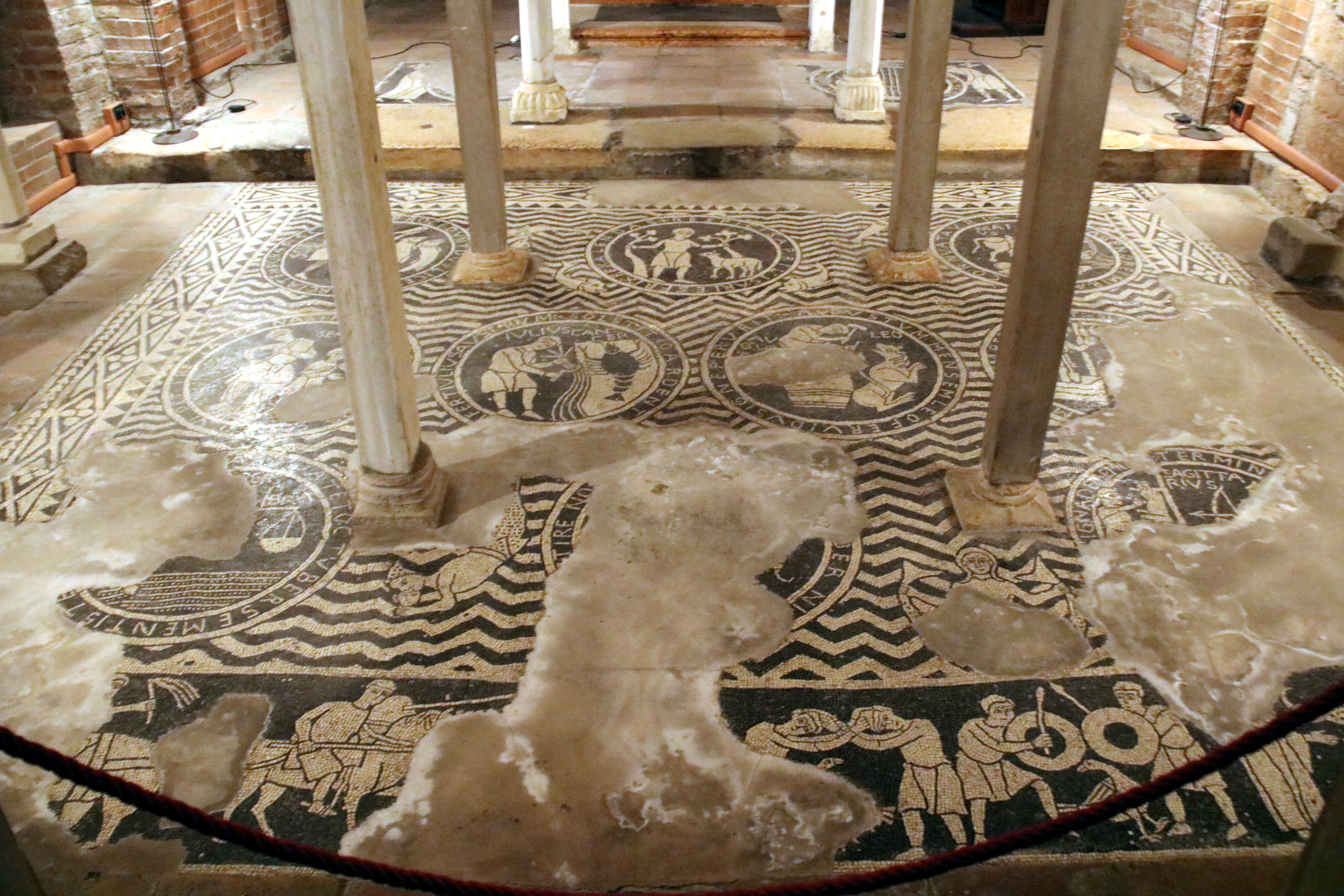
View of the crypt with mosaics of the zodiac

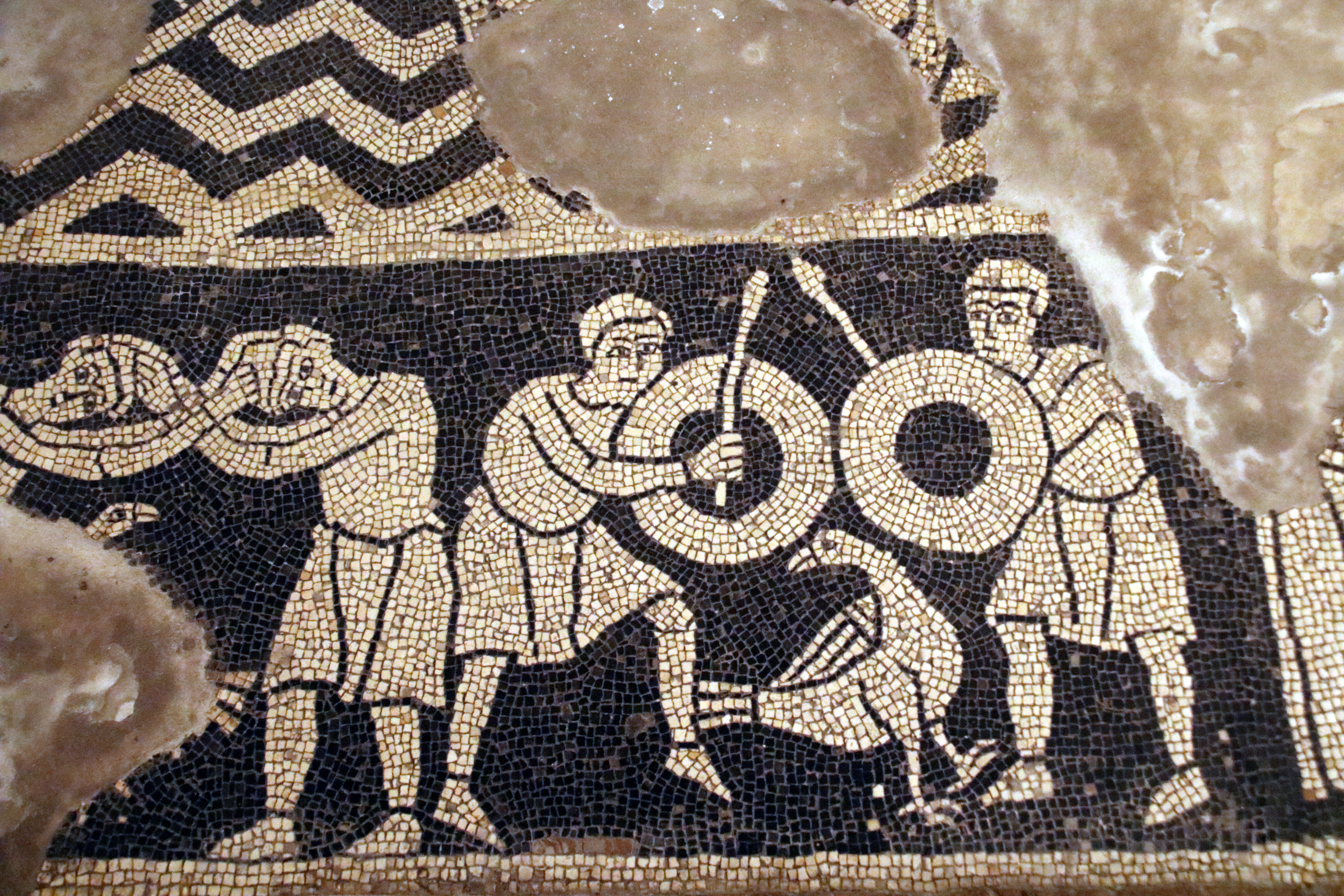
Floor mosaic, crypt

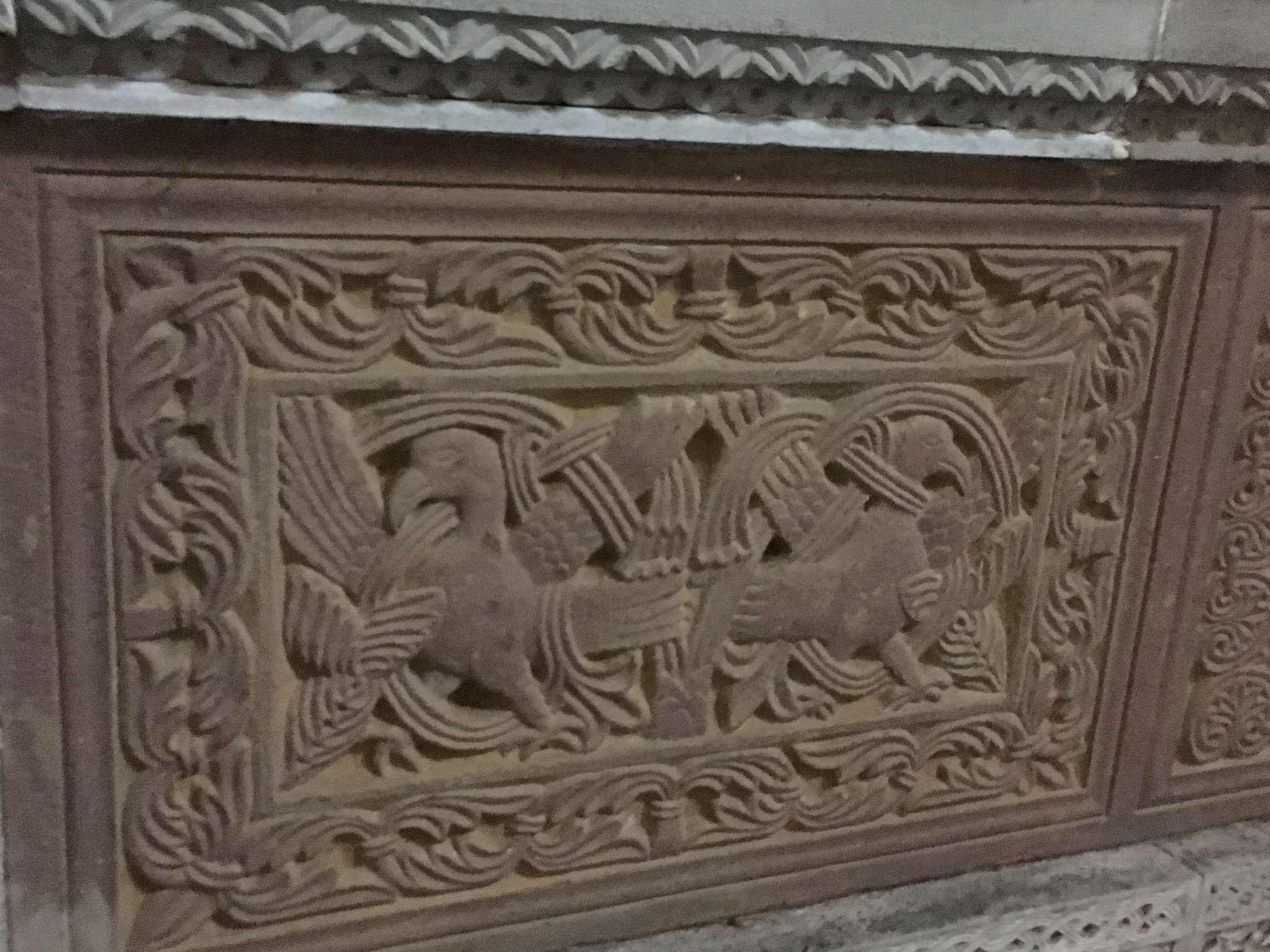
Romanesque carving

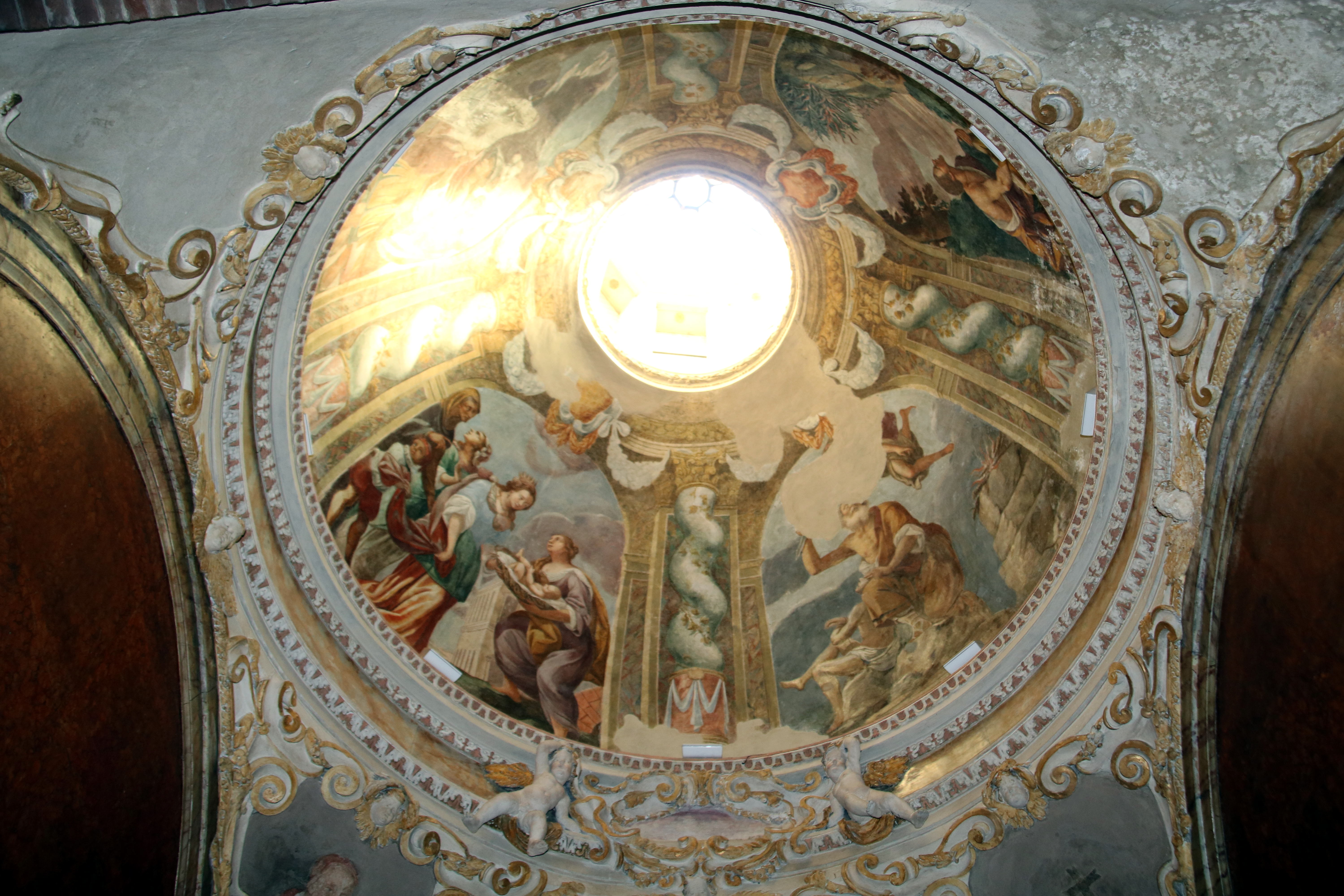
Capella della della Medaglia Miracolosa, dome frescoes by Giovanni Evangelista Draghi

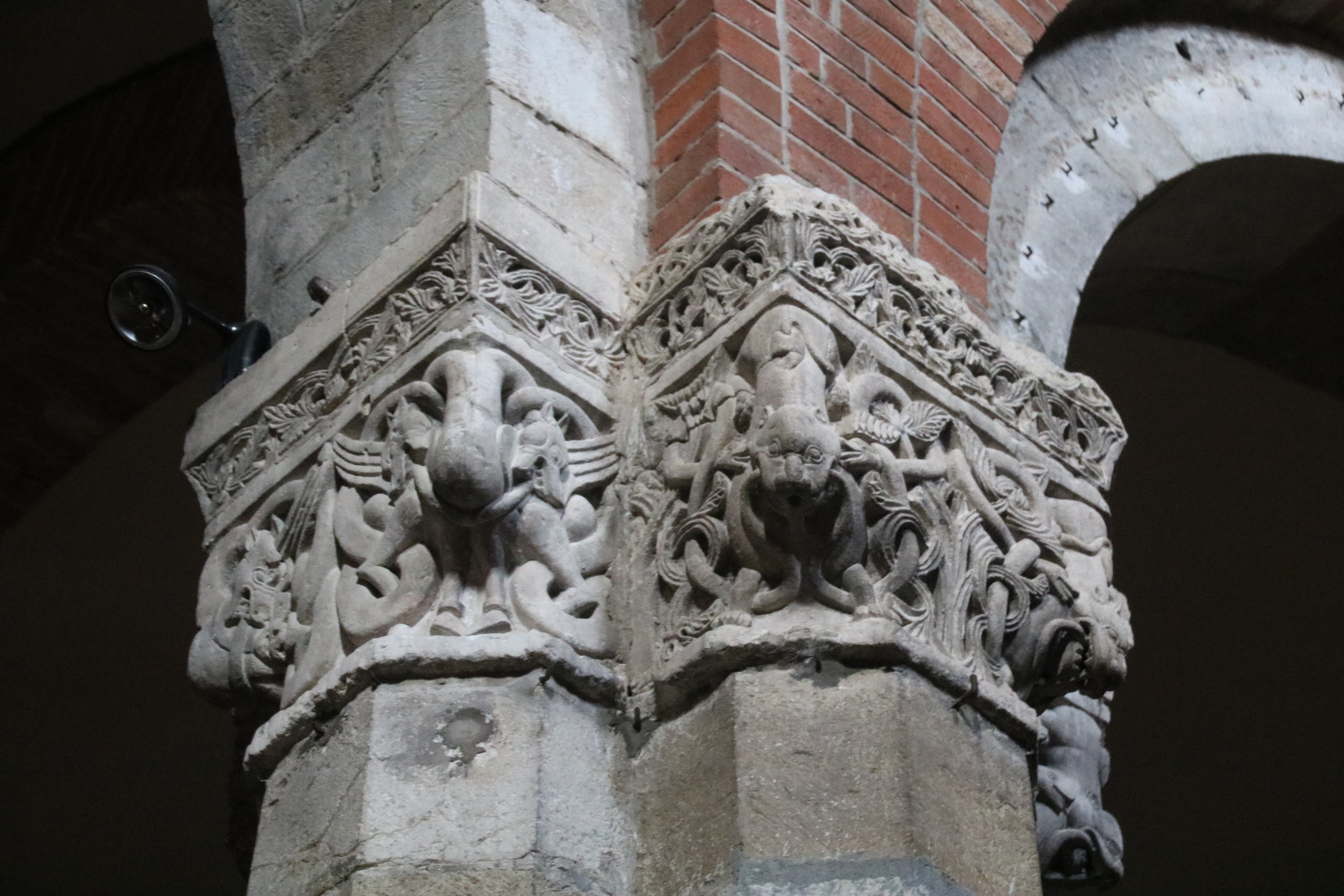
Romanesque Capital, nave

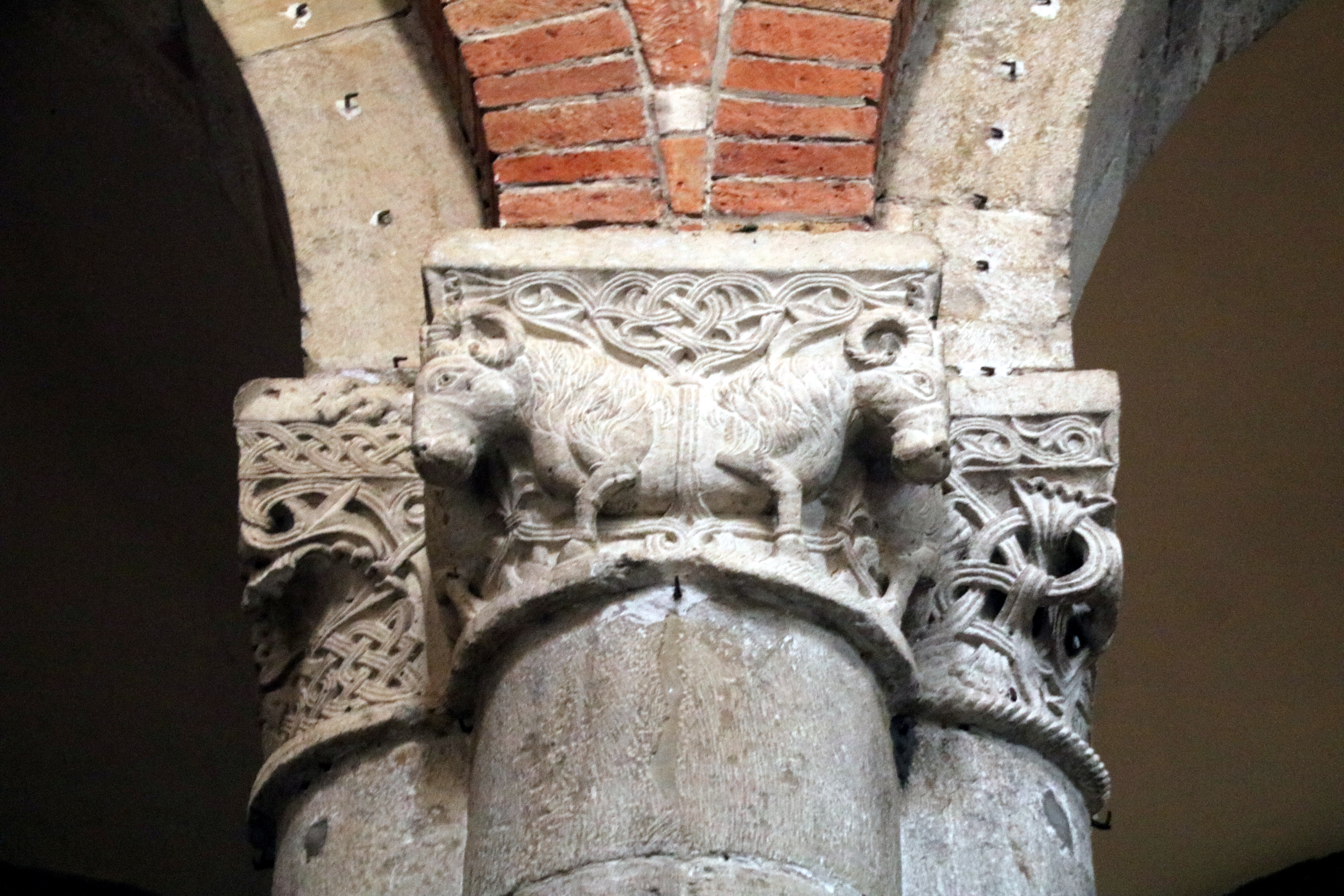
Capital, nave

Surviving capital from the 903 building, crypt

== Bibliography ==
- Malchiodi, Gaetano (1905). San Savino, Vescovo di Piacenza. Piacenza: F. Solari di Gregorio Tonini.
- Moehs, Teta E. (1972). Gregorius V, 996–999: A biographical Study. Stuttgart: Anton Hiersemann.
- Nicklies, C. E. (1995). "Cosmology and the Labors of the Months at Piacenza: The Crypt Mosaic at San Savino". Gesta. 34 (2): 108–125. doi:10.2307/767283. JSTOR 767283. S2CID 193497787.
- Porter, A. Kingsley (1912a). "San Savino at Piacenza, I: History and Structure". American Journal of Archaeology. 16 (3): 350–367. doi:10.2307/497193. JSTOR 497193. S2CID 191373774.
- Porter, A. Kingsley (1912b). "San Savino at Piacenza, II: Ornament, Conclusions". American Journal of Archaeology. 16 (4): 495–517. doi:10.2307/497423. JSTOR 497423.
