= Sant'Anna, Piacenza =

Roman Catholic parish church in Piacenza, Italy

Coordinates: 45°2′52″N 9°42′7.6″E

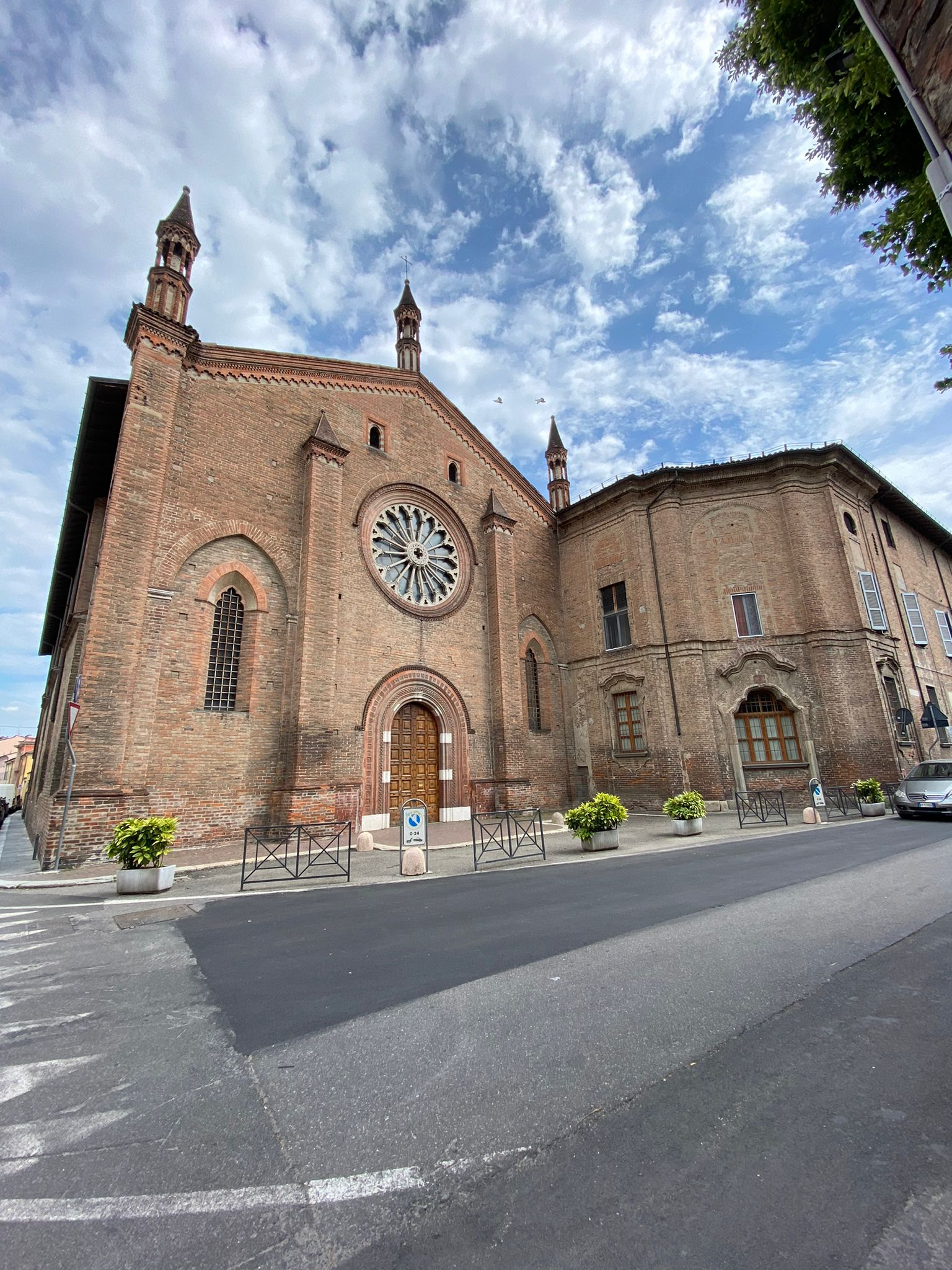
Piacenza - chiesa di Sant'Anna.jpg

Sant'Anna is a Gothic style, Roman Catholic parish church, located at Via Scalabrini #83 in Piacenza, Region of Emilia Romagna, Italy.

== History ==
A small church at the site titled Santa Maria di Betlem was associated with a nearby convent of the Umiliati. In 1334, the property passed to an order of Servite nuns, who rebuilt the structures and dedicated the church to St Anne. It remained with this order until 1788, when the church was assigned to Oratorian priests. By 1806, parts of the convent were used as a jail for women and an orphanage for boys. The prison was soon closed, and by 1819, the orphanage moved to the monastery of San Savino. In 1841, the convent then became use as a hospital and hospice run by Carmelites. In 1868, the church took the role of local parish temple from the church of San Salvatore.

The apse had been enlarged in 1500 to host the cloistered nuns during services. The construction of six side altars in the 17th-century caused the gothic-style lancet windows to be walled up. The facade of the church was not completed until 1925 using designs by Camillo Guidotti. The belltower was not erected until 1937 using designs by Pietro Berzolla.

Much of the interior church decoration is from the past two centuries. According to tradition, the monastery complex hosted a 14th-century wooden icon and painting of San Rocco. The Via Crucis canvases were painted (1892) by Paolo Bozzini. The stained glass window of St Roch on the facade was completed in 1925, while the side windows were completed only after 1980. The four stained glass windows of the apse designed by the Peresson firm from Milan, by their artist Trento Longaretti of Bergamo and depict Nativity, Baptism, Crucifixion, and the Mourning of the Death of Jesus Christ. In church on right is a fresco on Resurrection of Christ by Bernardino Gatti.
