= Sabinus of Piacenza =

Saint Sabinus of Piacenza
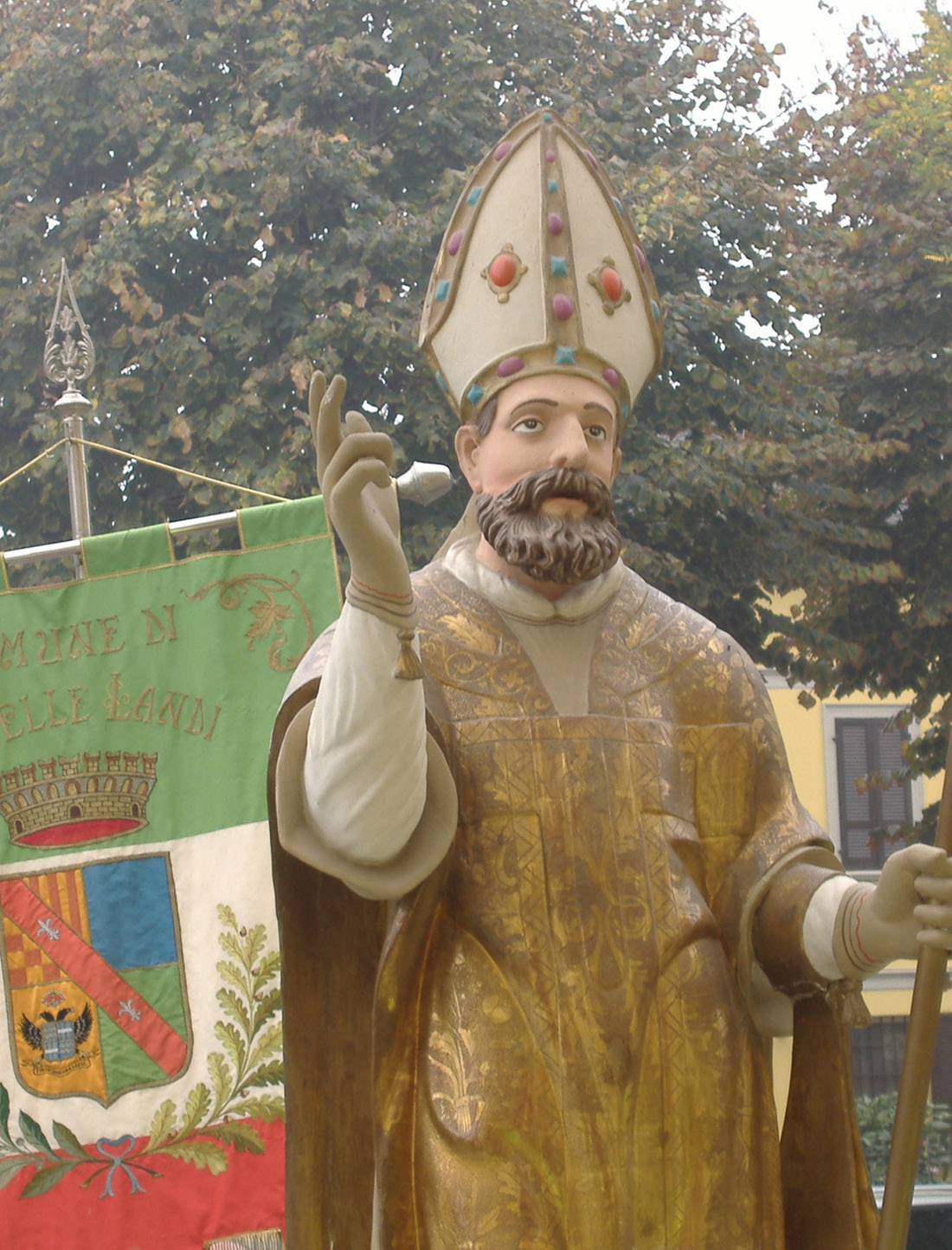
- Statue of Saint Sabinus located in the church of Caselle Landi.

bishop of Piacenza
- Born: 333; Milan, Italy
- Died: December 11, 420; Piacenza, Italy
- Venerated in: Roman Catholic Church
- Major shrine: Piacenza
- Feast: 11 December

Saint Sabinus of Piacenza (Italian: San Sabino di Piacenza) (333 – December 11, 420), venerated as a saint in the Roman Catholic church, was bishop of Piacenza until his death in the year 420.

== Life ==
Sabinus was born in Milan around 330 - 340. Initially was a deacon of Milan, then became bishop of Piacenza for other 50 years.

He was one of founding fathers of the Council of Antioch in 372. He defended Catholicism against the arian heresy.

He died about after 50 years as bishop, on December 11, 420.

== Cult ==
His relics are located into the Basilica of San Savino in Piacenza. Saint Sabinus is venerated in Caselle Landi, in both of which places the churches are dedicated to him, in the neighbourhood of Piacenza.

== Gallery ==
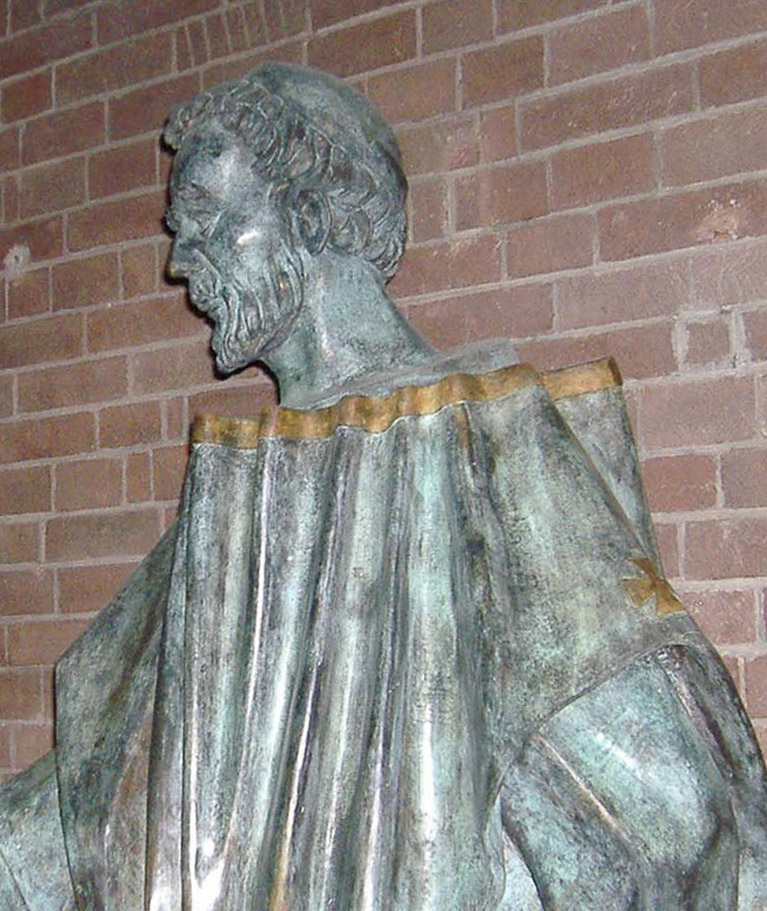
Statue of saint Sabinus into the Basilica of Saint Sabinus in Piacenza.

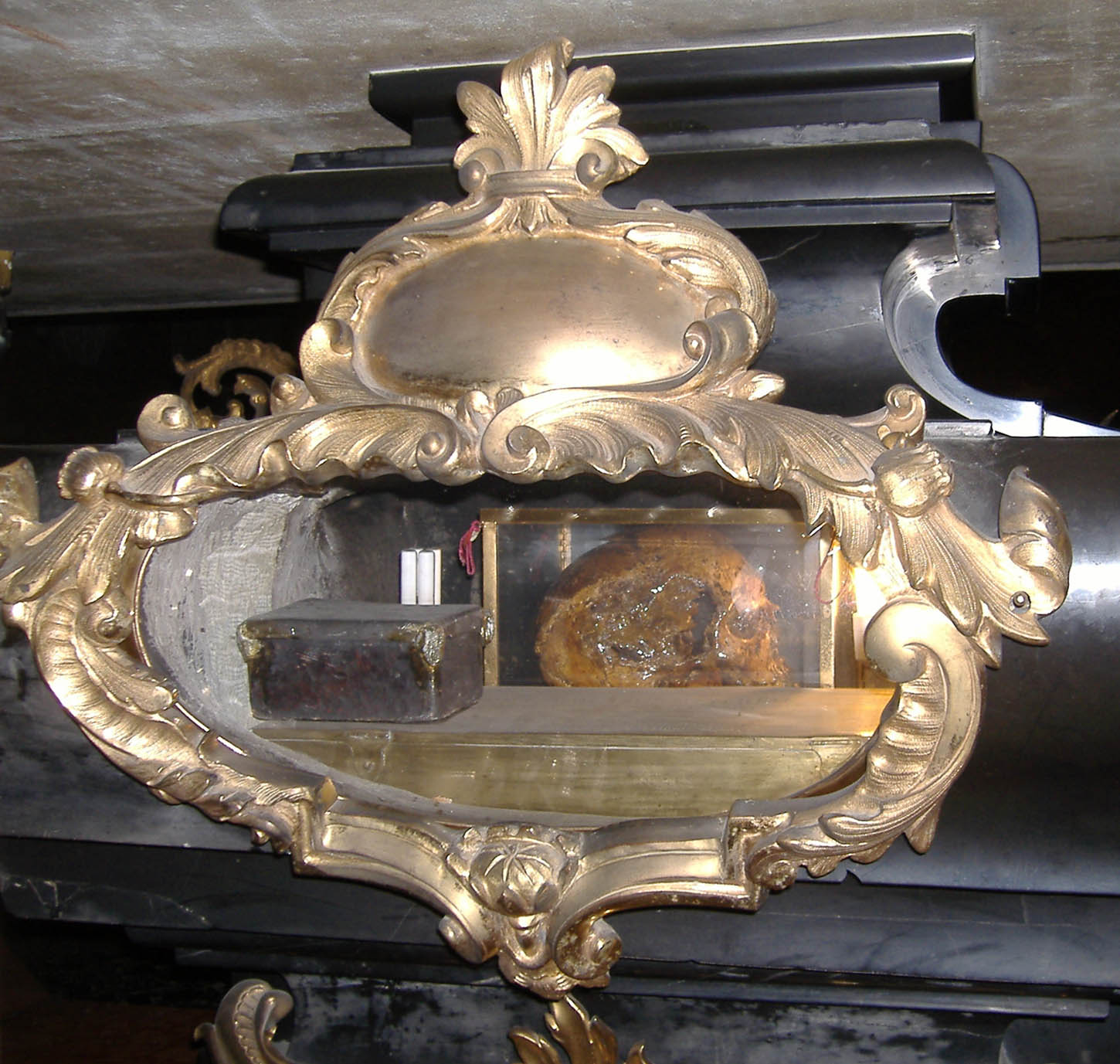
The relics of the saint located in the homonym church.
