= List of municipalities of Emilia-Romagna =

Location of Emilia-Romagna within Italy

Provinces of Emilia-Romagna

This is a list of the municipalities (comuni) of the region of Emilia-Romagna in Italy.

There are 330 municipalities in Emilia-Romagna as of 2026:

- 55 in the Metropolitan City of Bologna
- 21 in the Province of Ferrara
- 30 in the Province of Forlì-Cesena
- 47 in the Province of Modena
- 44 in the Province of Parma
- 46 in the Province of Piacenza
- 18 in the Province of Ravenna
- 42 in the Province of Reggio Emilia
- 27 in the Province of Rimini

== List ==
Municipality	Province	Population (2026)	Area (km²)	Density
Agazzano	Piacenza	2,054	36.15	56.8
Albareto	Parma	2,038	104.11	19.6
Albinea	Reggio Emilia	8,986	43.89	204.7
Alfonsine	Ravenna	11,667	106.79	109.3
Alseno	Piacenza	4,785	55.27	86.6
Alta Val Tidone	Piacenza	2,927	100.86	29.0
Alto Reno Terme	Bologna	7,179	73.62	97.5
Anzola dell'Emilia	Bologna	12,414	36.60	339.2
Argelato	Bologna	9,573	35.10	272.7
Argenta	Ferrara	21,295	311.67	68.3
Bagnacavallo	Ravenna	16,519	79.58	207.6
Bagnara di Romagna	Ravenna	2,317	9.96	232.6
Bagno di Romagna	Forlì-Cesena	5,584	233.52	23.9
Bagnolo in Piano	Reggio Emilia	9,588	26.94	355.9
Baiso	Reggio Emilia	3,268	75.55	43.3
Bardi	Parma	1,947	189.90	10.3
Baricella	Bologna	7,207	45.48	158.5
Bastiglia	Modena	4,244	10.47	405.3
Bedonia	Parma	3,103	169.56	18.3
Bellaria-Igea Marina	Rimini	19,562	18.17	1,076.6
Bentivoglio	Bologna	5,855	51.11	114.6
Berceto	Parma	1,917	131.71	14.6
Bertinoro	Forlì-Cesena	11,193	57.25	195.5
Besenzone	Piacenza	936	23.95	39.1
Bettola	Piacenza	2,627	122.37	21.5
Bibbiano	Reggio Emilia	10,199	28.16	362.2
Bobbio	Piacenza	3,344	106.53	31.4
Bologna	Bologna	391,473	140.86	2,779.2
Bomporto	Modena	10,398	38.87	267.5
Bondeno	Ferrara	14,179	174.76	81.1
Bore	Parma	619	43.01	14.4
Boretto	Reggio Emilia	5,456	18.11	301.3
Borghi	Forlì-Cesena	2,915	30.23	96.4
Borgo Tossignano	Bologna	3,231	29.27	110.4
Borgo Val di Taro	Parma	6,736	151.49	44.5
Borgonovo Val Tidone	Piacenza	8,305	51.22	162.1
Brescello	Reggio Emilia	5,556	24.04	231.1
Brisighella	Ravenna	7,181	194.33	37.0
Budrio	Bologna	18,494	120.19	153.9
Busseto	Parma	6,902	76.59	90.1
Cadelbosco di Sopra	Reggio Emilia	10,727	43.60	246.0
Cadeo	Piacenza	6,116	38.48	158.9
Calderara di Reno	Bologna	13,767	40.75	337.8
Calendasco	Piacenza	2,465	36.94	66.7
Calestano	Parma	2,183	57.36	38.1
Campagnola Emilia	Reggio Emilia	5,551	24.39	227.6
Campegine	Reggio Emilia	5,414	22.62	239.3
Campogalliano	Modena	8,516	35.69	238.6
Camposanto	Modena	3,397	22.71	149.6
Camugnano	Bologna	1,911	96.60	19.8
Canossa	Reggio Emilia	3,796	53.08	71.5
Caorso	Piacenza	4,797	40.98	117.1
Carpaneto Piacentino	Piacenza	7,775	63.08	123.3
Carpi	Modena	74,041	131.54	562.9
Carpineti	Reggio Emilia	3,905	89.57	43.6
Casalecchio di Reno	Bologna	35,359	17.33	2,040.3
Casalfiumanese	Bologna	3,361	82.03	41.0
Casalgrande	Reggio Emilia	19,039	37.71	504.9
Casina	Reggio Emilia	4,619	63.80	72.4
Casola Valsenio	Ravenna	2,489	84.42	29.5
Castel Bolognese	Ravenna	9,484	32.37	293.0
Castel d'Aiano	Bologna	1,969	45.26	43.5
Castel del Rio	Bologna	1,224	52.58	23.3
Castel di Casio	Bologna	3,348	47.33	70.7
Castel Guelfo di Bologna	Bologna	4,473	28.61	156.3
Castel Maggiore	Bologna	18,479	30.90	598.0
Castel San Giovanni	Piacenza	14,402	44.04	327.0
Castel San Pietro Terme	Bologna	20,702	148.42	139.5
Casteldelci	Rimini	349	49.68	7.0
Castelfranco Emilia	Modena	33,625	102.51	328.0
Castell'Arquato	Piacenza	4,712	52.75	89.3
Castellarano	Reggio Emilia	15,160	58.06	261.1
Castello d'Argile	Bologna	6,694	29.07	230.3
Castelnovo di Sotto	Reggio Emilia	8,707	35.01	248.7
Castelnovo ne' Monti	Reggio Emilia	10,407	96.68	107.6
Castelnuovo Rangone	Modena	15,116	22.44	673.6
Castelvetro di Modena	Modena	10,960	49.78	220.2
Castelvetro Piacentino	Piacenza	5,430	35.06	154.9
Castenaso	Bologna	16,670	35.73	466.6
Castiglione dei Pepoli	Bologna	5,499	65.76	83.6
Castrocaro Terme e Terra del Sole	Forlì-Cesena	6,530	38.95	167.7
Cattolica	Rimini	16,614	6.20	2,679.7
Cavezzo	Modena	7,236	26.77	270.3
Cavriago	Reggio Emilia	9,947	17.02	584.4
Cento	Ferrara	35,836	64.74	553.5
Cerignale	Piacenza	109	30.82	3.5
Cervia	Ravenna	29,075	82.27	353.4
Cesena	Forlì-Cesena	95,620	249.47	383.3
Cesenatico	Forlì-Cesena	26,042	45.16	576.7
Civitella di Romagna	Forlì-Cesena	3,626	117.93	30.7
Codigoro	Ferrara	10,932	170.01	64.3
Coli	Piacenza	877	71.69	12.2
Collecchio	Parma	14,911	58.83	253.5
Colorno	Parma	9,174	48.41	189.5
Comacchio	Ferrara	22,003	284.13	77.4
Compiano	Parma	1,047	37.53	27.9
Concordia sulla Secchia	Modena	8,541	40.97	208.5
Conselice	Ravenna	9,734	60.20	161.7
Copparo	Ferrara	15,657	157.01	99.7
Coriano	Rimini	10,487	46.77	224.2
Corniglio	Parma	1,779	165.70	10.7
Correggio	Reggio Emilia	25,234	77.51	325.6
Corte Brugnatella	Piacenza	501	46.31	10.8
Cortemaggiore	Piacenza	4,757	36.47	130.4
Cotignola	Ravenna	7,337	35.14	208.8
Crevalcore	Bologna	14,210	102.75	138.3
Dovadola	Forlì-Cesena	1,591	38.97	40.8
Dozza	Bologna	6,513	24.23	268.8
Fabbrico	Reggio Emilia	6,931	23.63	293.3
Faenza	Ravenna	58,750	215.76	272.3
Fanano	Modena	2,984	89.91	33.2
Farini	Piacenza	1,044	112.36	9.3
Felino	Parma	9,278	38.35	241.9
Ferrara	Ferrara	129,048	405.16	318.5
Ferriere	Piacenza	1,081	178.50	6.1
Fidenza	Parma	27,573	95.12	289.9
Finale Emilia	Modena	15,570	105.13	148.1
Fiorano Modenese	Modena	16,610	26.23	633.2
Fiorenzuola d'Arda	Piacenza	15,048	59.77	251.8
Fiscaglia	Ferrara	8,563	116.19	73.7
Fiumalbo	Modena	1,177	39.14	30.1
Fontanelice	Bologna	1,910	36.56	52.2
Fontanellato	Parma	7,095	53.98	131.4
Fontevivo	Parma	5,529	26.00	212.7
Forlì	Forlì-Cesena	118,053	228.20	517.3
Forlimpopoli	Forlì-Cesena	13,140	24.46	537.2
Formigine	Modena	34,496	46.74	738.0
Fornovo di Taro	Parma	6,039	57.52	105.0
Frassinoro	Modena	1,697	95.46	17.8
Fusignano	Ravenna	8,258	24.55	336.4
Gaggio Montano	Bologna	4,931	58.67	84.0
Galeata	Forlì-Cesena	2,556	63.13	40.5
Galliera	Bologna	5,776	37.15	155.5
Gambettola	Forlì-Cesena	10,963	7.77	1,410.9
Gattatico	Reggio Emilia	5,823	42.15	138.1
Gatteo	Forlì-Cesena	9,469	14.14	669.7
Gazzola	Piacenza	2,201	44.48	49.5
Gemmano	Rimini	1,156	18.85	61.3
Goro	Ferrara	3,353	33.18	101.1
Gossolengo	Piacenza	5,695	31.10	183.1
Gragnano Trebbiense	Piacenza	4,515	34.61	130.5
Granarolo dell'Emilia	Bologna	13,117	34.37	381.6
Grizzana Morandi	Bologna	3,947	77.40	51.0
Gropparello	Piacenza	2,173	56.33	38.6
Gualtieri	Reggio Emilia	6,364	35.65	178.5
Guastalla	Reggio Emilia	14,675	52.93	277.3
Guiglia	Modena	4,356	48.30	90.2
Imola	Bologna	69,702	205.02	340.0
Jolanda di Savoia	Ferrara	2,595	108.34	24.0
Lagosanto	Ferrara	4,658	34.44	135.2
Lama Mocogno	Modena	2,679	63.91	41.9
Langhirano	Parma	10,964	70.84	154.8
Lesignano de' Bagni	Parma	5,142	47.49	108.3
Lizzano in Belvedere	Bologna	2,295	85.45	26.9
Loiano	Bologna	4,589	52.41	87.6
Longiano	Forlì-Cesena	7,194	23.58	305.1
Lugagnano Val d'Arda	Piacenza	3,927	54.40	72.2
Lugo	Ravenna	32,128	117.06	274.5
Luzzara	Reggio Emilia	8,577	38.54	222.5
Maiolo	Rimini	783	24.28	32.2
Malalbergo	Bologna	9,403	53.82	174.7
Maranello	Modena	17,360	32.58	532.8
Marano sul Panaro	Modena	5,319	45.47	117.0
Marzabotto	Bologna	6,926	74.53	92.9
Masi Torello	Ferrara	2,241	22.71	98.7
Massa Lombarda	Ravenna	10,928	37.25	293.4
Medesano	Parma	10,762	88.77	121.2
Medicina	Bologna	16,817	159.11	105.7
Medolla	Modena	6,531	27.00	241.9
Meldola	Forlì-Cesena	10,037	79.08	126.9
Mercato Saraceno	Forlì-Cesena	6,826	99.33	68.7
Mesola	Ferrara	6,315	84.31	74.9
Minerbio	Bologna	8,959	43.07	208.0
Mirandola	Modena	24,921	137.09	181.8
Misano Adriatico	Rimini	14,171	22.35	634.0
Modena	Modena	184,361	183.19	1,006.4
Modigliana	Forlì-Cesena	4,301	101.17	42.5
Molinella	Bologna	15,910	127.84	124.5
Monchio delle Corti	Parma	836	69.04	12.1
Mondaino	Rimini	1,357	19.84	68.4
Monghidoro	Bologna	3,934	48.29	81.5
Monte San Pietro	Bologna	10,845	74.69	145.2
Montecchio Emilia	Reggio Emilia	10,441	24.39	428.1
Montechiarugolo	Parma	11,444	48.20	237.4
Montecopiolo	Rimini	1,029	35.81	28.7
Montecreto	Modena	951	31.22	30.5
Montefiore Conca	Rimini	2,312	22.32	103.6
Montefiorino	Modena	2,119	45.28	46.8
Montegridolfo	Rimini	1,025	6.94	147.7
Monterenzio	Bologna	6,169	105.26	58.6
Montescudo-Monte Colombo	Rimini	7,004	32.35	216.5
Montese	Modena	3,374	81.01	41.6
Montiano	Forlì-Cesena	1,695	9.26	183.0
Monticelli d'Ongina	Piacenza	5,223	46.33	112.7
Monzuno	Bologna	6,433	65.01	99.0
Morciano di Romagna	Rimini	7,282	5.44	1,338.6
Mordano	Bologna	4,588	21.45	213.9
Morfasso	Piacenza	849	83.93	10.1
Neviano degli Arduini	Parma	3,465	105.96	32.7
Noceto	Parma	13,367	79.17	168.8
Nonantola	Modena	16,186	55.32	292.6
Novafeltria	Rimini	7,031	41.84	168.0
Novellara	Reggio Emilia	13,406	58.11	230.7
Novi di Modena	Modena	10,413	51.82	200.9
Ostellato	Ferrara	5,609	173.34	32.4
Ottone	Piacenza	390	98.96	3.9
Ozzano dell'Emilia	Bologna	14,416	64.95	222.0
Palagano	Modena	2,034	60.41	33.7
Palanzano	Parma	999	69.80	14.3
Parma	Parma	199,450	260.60	765.3
Pavullo nel Frignano	Modena	18,405	143.73	128.1
Pellegrino Parmense	Parma	967	82.08	11.8
Pennabilli	Rimini	2,692	69.80	38.6
Piacenza	Piacenza	103,737	118.24	877.3
Pianello Val Tidone	Piacenza	2,179	36.29	60.0
Pianoro	Bologna	17,852	107.13	166.6
Pieve di Cento	Bologna	7,431	15.94	466.2
Pievepelago	Modena	2,096	76.54	27.4
Piozzano	Piacenza	581	43.61	13.3
Podenzano	Piacenza	9,045	44.34	204.0
Poggio Renatico	Ferrara	9,720	80.23	121.2
Poggio Torriana	Rimini	5,097	34.74	146.7
Polesine Zibello	Parma	3,137	48.52	64.7
Polinago	Modena	1,604	53.74	29.8
Ponte dell'Olio	Piacenza	4,694	43.92	106.9
Pontenure	Piacenza	6,719	33.85	198.5
Portico e San Benedetto	Forlì-Cesena	716	61.05	11.7
Portomaggiore	Ferrara	12,433	126.64	98.2
Poviglio	Reggio Emilia	7,240	43.55	166.2
Predappio	Forlì-Cesena	6,364	91.39	69.6
Premilcuore	Forlì-Cesena	675	98.56	6.8
Prignano sulla Secchia	Modena	3,898	79.67	48.9
Quattro Castella	Reggio Emilia	13,226	46.31	285.6
Ravarino	Modena	6,388	28.53	223.9
Ravenna	Ravenna	156,475	653.82	239.3
Reggio nell'Emilia	Reggio Emilia	172,921	230.66	749.7
Reggiolo	Reggio Emilia	9,318	42.68	218.3
Riccione	Rimini	34,367	17.50	1,963.8
Rimini	Rimini	150,774	135.71	1,111.0
Rio Saliceto	Reggio Emilia	6,099	22.56	270.3
Riolo Terme	Ravenna	5,824	44.26	131.6
Riolunato	Modena	657	44.91	14.6
Riva del Po	Ferrara	7,401	111.84	66.2
Rivergaro	Piacenza	7,172	43.83	163.6
Rocca San Casciano	Forlì-Cesena	1,823	50.56	36.1
Roccabianca	Parma	2,938	40.46	72.6
Rolo	Reggio Emilia	4,040	14.17	285.1
Roncofreddo	Forlì-Cesena	3,558	51.53	69.0
Rottofreno	Piacenza	12,320	35.17	350.3
Rubiera	Reggio Emilia	14,522	25.19	576.5
Russi	Ravenna	12,282	46.26	265.5
Sala Baganza	Parma	6,105	30.76	198.5
Sala Bolognese	Bologna	8,451	45.64	185.2
Salsomaggiore Terme	Parma	20,640	81.50	253.3
Saludecio	Rimini	3,274	34.27	95.5
San Benedetto Val di Sambro	Bologna	4,268	66.47	64.2
San Cesario sul Panaro	Modena	6,676	27.31	244.5
San Clemente	Rimini	5,749	20.70	277.7
San Felice sul Panaro	Modena	11,049	51.66	213.9
San Giorgio di Piano	Bologna	9,771	30.43	321.1
San Giorgio Piacentino	Piacenza	5,586	49.19	113.6
San Giovanni in Marignano	Rimini	9,425	21.37	441.0
San Giovanni in Persiceto	Bologna	28,195	114.41	246.4
San Lazzaro di Savena	Bologna	32,950	44.72	736.8
San Leo	Rimini	2,877	53.14	54.1
San Martino in Rio	Reggio Emilia	8,246	22.72	362.9
San Mauro Pascoli	Forlì-Cesena	12,458	17.29	720.5
San Pietro in Casale	Bologna	13,206	65.86	200.5
San Pietro in Cerro	Piacenza	739	27.35	27.0
San Polo d'Enza	Reggio Emilia	6,140	32.29	190.2
San Possidonio	Modena	3,577	17.06	209.7
San Prospero	Modena	6,261	34.56	181.2
San Secondo Parmense	Parma	5,921	37.71	157.0
Sant'Agata Bolognese	Bologna	7,345	34.79	211.1
Sant'Agata Feltria	Rimini	1,957	79.74	24.5
Sant'Agata sul Santerno	Ravenna	2,834	9.37	302.5
Sant'Ilario d'Enza	Reggio Emilia	11,423	20.23	564.7
Santa Sofia	Forlì-Cesena	4,033	148.87	27.1
Santarcangelo di Romagna	Rimini	22,366	45.01	496.9
Sarmato	Piacenza	3,108	27.26	114.0
Sarsina	Forlì-Cesena	3,287	100.72	32.6
Sasso Marconi	Bologna	14,829	96.45	153.7
Sassofeltrio	Rimini	1,379	21.08	65.4
Sassuolo	Modena	41,123	38.40	1,070.9
Savignano sul Panaro	Modena	9,591	25.55	375.4
Savignano sul Rubicone	Forlì-Cesena	18,147	23.30	778.8
Scandiano	Reggio Emilia	25,979	50.05	519.1
Serramazzoni	Modena	8,980	93.96	95.6
Sestola	Modena	2,401	52.47	45.8
Sissa Trecasali	Parma	7,995	72.72	109.9
Sogliano al Rubicone	Forlì-Cesena	3,145	93.43	33.7
Solarolo	Ravenna	4,461	26.04	171.3
Soliera	Modena	15,460	50.93	303.6
Solignano	Parma	1,664	73.14	22.8
Soragna	Parma	4,797	45.39	105.7
Sorbolo Mezzani	Parma	13,175	66.98	196.7
Spilamberto	Modena	12,968	29.79	435.3
Talamello	Rimini	1,081	10.59	102.1
Terenzo	Parma	1,138	72.70	15.7
Terre del Reno	Ferrara	10,457	51.04	204.9
Tizzano Val Parma	Parma	2,226	78.39	28.4
Toano	Reggio Emilia	4,189	67.25	62.3
Tornolo	Parma	846	67.48	12.5
Torrile	Parma	7,709	37.15	207.5
Traversetolo	Parma	9,687	54.86	176.6
Travo	Piacenza	2,165	81.01	26.7
Tredozio	Forlì-Cesena	1,075	62.20	17.3
Tresignana	Ferrara	6,956	43.05	161.6
Valmozzola	Parma	527	67.64	7.8
Valsamoggia	Bologna	32,258	178.14	181.1
Varano de' Melegari	Parma	2,589	64.92	39.9
Varsi	Parma	1,149	80.07	14.3
Ventasso	Reggio Emilia	3,824	258.19	14.8
Vergato	Bologna	7,946	59.94	132.6
Verghereto	Forlì-Cesena	1,721	117.90	14.6
Vernasca	Piacenza	2,029	72.57	28.0
Verucchio	Rimini	10,044	27.30	367.9
Vetto	Reggio Emilia	1,802	53.37	33.8
Vezzano sul Crostolo	Reggio Emilia	4,433	37.82	117.2
Viano	Reggio Emilia	3,472	44.97	77.2
Vigarano Mainarda	Ferrara	7,637	42.02	181.7
Vignola	Modena	26,310	22.86	1,150.9
Vigolzone	Piacenza	4,324	42.04	102.9
Villa Minozzo	Reggio Emilia	3,507	168.08	20.9
Villanova sull'Arda	Piacenza	1,666	36.57	45.6
Voghiera	Ferrara	3,594	40.33	89.1
Zerba	Piacenza	66	24.13	2.7
Ziano Piacentino	Piacenza	2,550	32.78	77.8
Zocca	Modena	4,846	69.37	69.9
Zola Predosa	Bologna	19,516	37.75	517.0

== See also ==
- List of municipalities of Italy
