= List of municipalities of the Province of Parma =

The following is a list of the 44 municipalities (comuni) of the Province of Parma in the region of Emilia-Romagna in Italy.

== List ==
Municipality	Population (2026)	Area (km²)	Density
Albareto	2,038	104.11	19.6
Bardi	1,947	189.90	10.3
Bedonia	3,103	169.56	18.3
Berceto	1,917	131.71	14.6
Bore	619	43.01	14.4
Borgo Val di Taro	6,736	151.49	44.5
Busseto	6,902	76.59	90.1
Calestano	2,183	57.36	38.1
Collecchio	14,911	58.83	253.5
Colorno	9,174	48.41	189.5
Compiano	1,047	37.53	27.9
Corniglio	1,779	165.70	10.7
Felino	9,278	38.35	241.9
Fidenza	27,573	95.12	289.9
Fontanellato	7,095	53.98	131.4
Fontevivo	5,529	26.00	212.7
Fornovo di Taro	6,039	57.52	105.0
Langhirano	10,964	70.84	154.8
Lesignano de' Bagni	5,142	47.49	108.3
Medesano	10,762	88.77	121.2
Monchio delle Corti	836	69.04	12.1
Montechiarugolo	11,444	48.20	237.4
Neviano degli Arduini	3,465	105.96	32.7
Noceto	13,367	79.17	168.8
Palanzano	999	69.80	14.3
Parma	199,450	260.60	765.3
Pellegrino Parmense	967	82.08	11.8
Polesine Zibello	3,137	48.52	64.7
Roccabianca	2,938	40.46	72.6
Sala Baganza	6,105	30.76	198.5
Salsomaggiore Terme	20,640	81.50	253.3
San Secondo Parmense	5,921	37.71	157.0
Sissa Trecasali	7,995	72.72	109.9
Solignano	1,664	73.14	22.8
Soragna	4,797	45.39	105.7
Sorbolo Mezzani	13,175	66.98	196.7
Terenzo	1,138	72.70	15.7
Tizzano Val Parma	2,226	78.39	28.4
Tornolo	846	67.48	12.5
Torrile	7,709	37.15	207.5
Traversetolo	9,687	54.86	176.6
Valmozzola	527	67.64	7.8
Varano de' Melegari	2,589	64.92	39.9
Varsi	1,149	80.07	14.3

== See also ==
- List of municipalities of Emilia-Romagna
- List of municipalities of Italy
