= Medesano =

- Comune
- Comune di Medesano
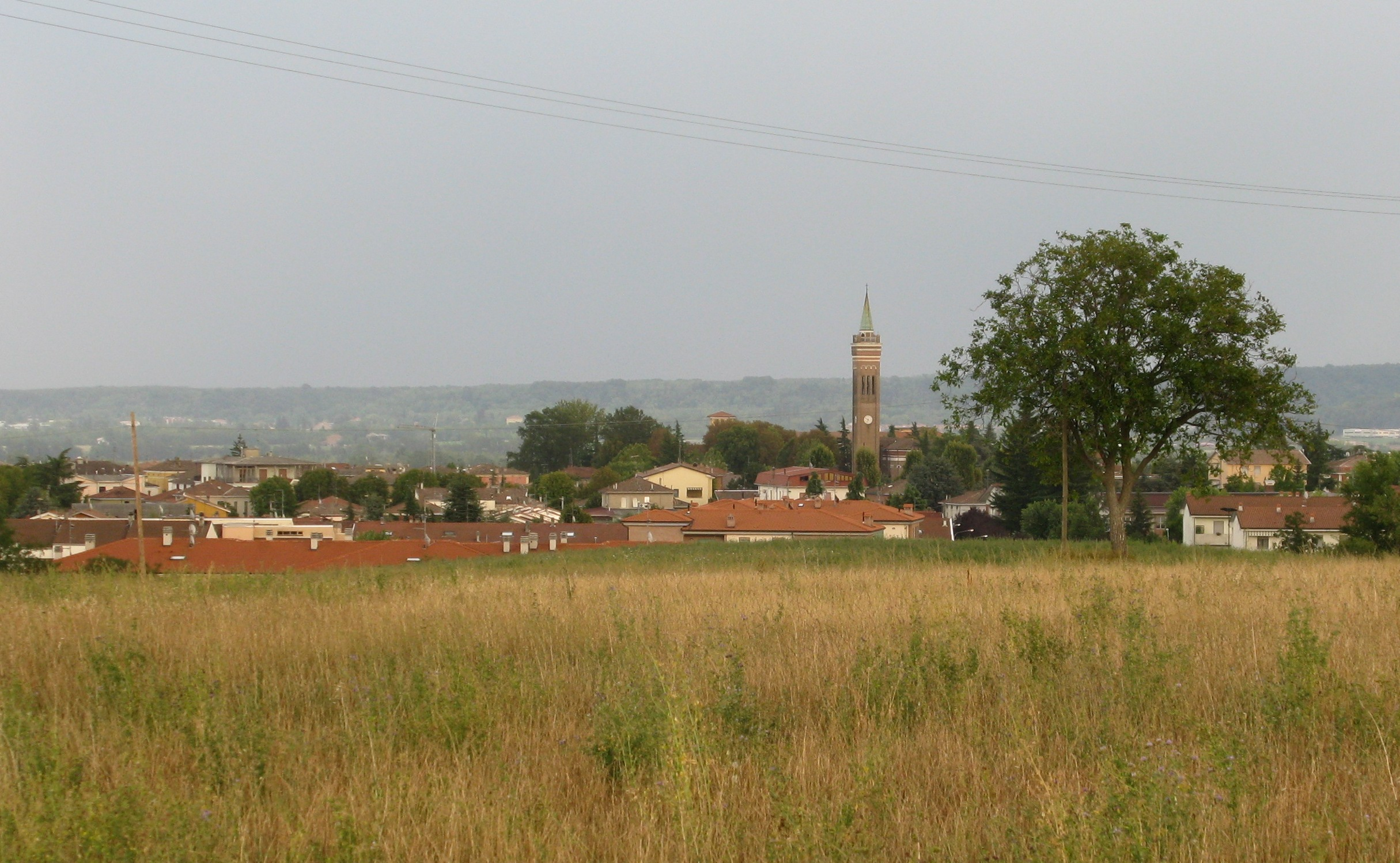

- Location within Italy Location within Emilia-Romagna
- Coordinates: 44°45′N 10°8′E
- Country: Italy
- Region: Emilia-Romagna
- Province: Province of Parma (PR)
- Frazioni: Arduini, Ca'Bernini, Ca'Dordone, Ca'Rettori, Casa di Cura, Case Caselli, Case Faggi, Casa Matteo, Cavicchiolo, Divisione Julia, Felegara, Ferrari, Il Novellino, La Carnevala, Mezzadri, Pianezza, Ramiola, Roccalanzona, Sant'Andrea Bagni, Troilo, Varano Marchesi

Area
  - Total: 88.8 km^{2} (34.3 sq mi)

Population (May 2007)
  - Total: 10,221
  - Density: 115/km^{2} (298/sq mi)
- Time zone: UTC+1 (CET)
  - Summer (DST): UTC+2 (CEST)
- Postal code: 43014
- Dialing code: 0525
- Website: Official website

Medesano (Parmigiano: Medzàn) is a comune (municipality) in the Province of Parma in the Italian region Emilia-Romagna, located about 100 kilometres (62 mi) northwest of Bologna and about 15 kilometres (9 mi) southwest of Parma. As of 31 May 2007, it had a population of 10,221 and an area of 88.8 square kilometres (34.3 mi^{2}).

The municipality of Medesano contains the frazioni (subdivisions, mainly villages and hamlets) Arduini, Ca'Bernini, Ca'Dordone, Ca'Rettori, Casa di Cura, Case Caselli, Case Faggi, Casa Matteo, Cavicchiolo, Divisione Julia, Felegara, Ferrari, Il Novellino, La Carnevala, Mezzadri, Pianezza, Ramiola, Roccalanzona, Sant'Andrea Bagni, Troilo, and Varano Marchesi.

Medesano borders the following municipalities: Collecchio, Fidenza, Fornovo di Taro, Noceto, Pellegrino Parmense, Salsomaggiore Terme, Varano de' Melegari.

== Demographic evolution ==
Historical population

Year	Pop.	±%
1861	4,370	—
1871	4,671	+6.9%
1881	4,877	+4.4%
1901	5,113	+4.8%
1911	6,120	+19.7%

Year	Pop.	±%
1921	7,319	+19.6%
1931	7,966	+8.8%
1936	7,949	−0.2%
1951	8,057	+1.4%
1961	7,310	−9.3%

Year	Pop.	±%
1971	7,079	−3.2%
1981	7,618	+7.6%
1991	7,909	+3.8%
2001	9,139	+15.6%

Source: Data from ISTAT
