= Valmozzola =

- Comune
- Comune di Valmozzola
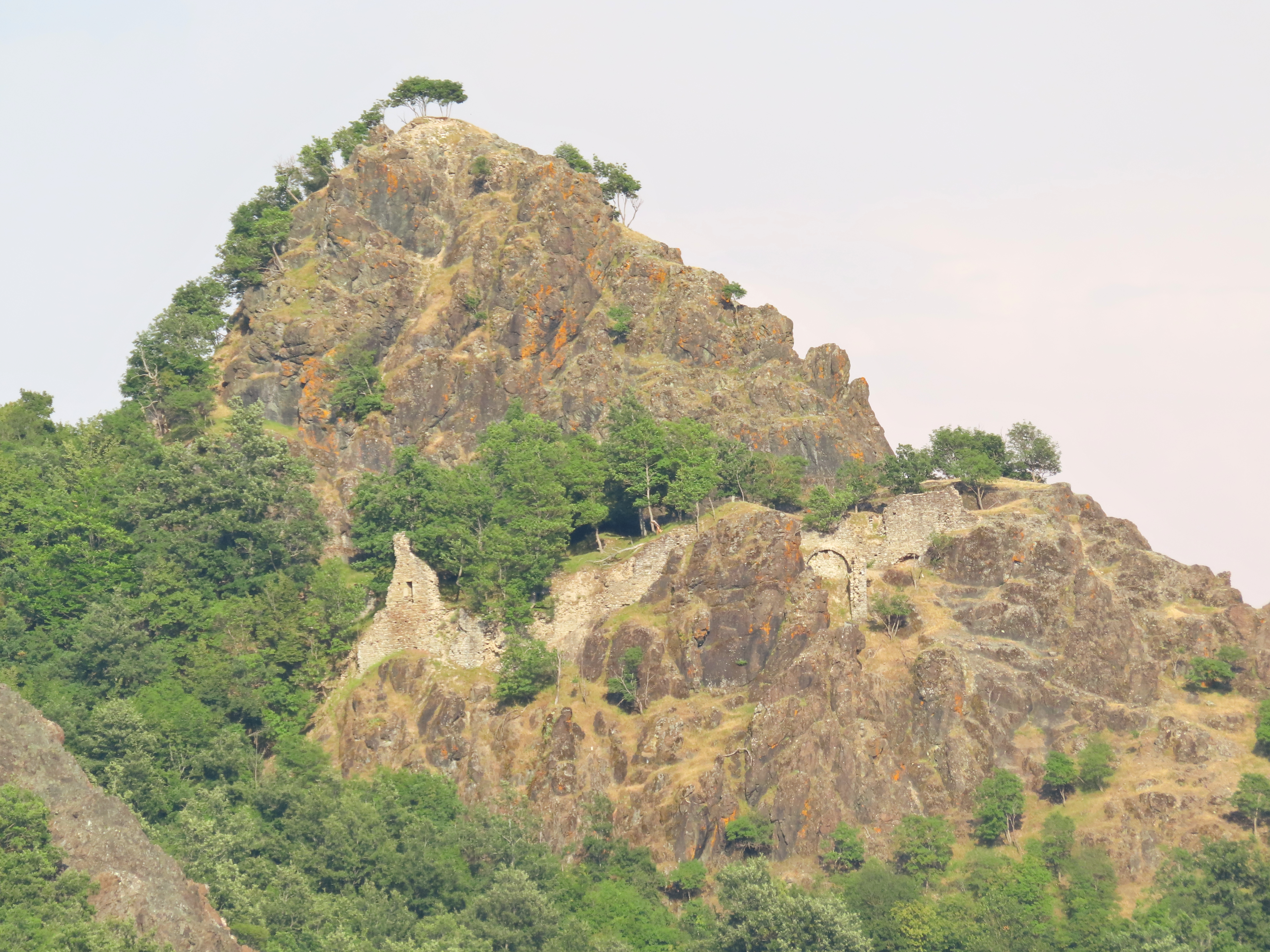
- Castle of Gusaliggio

- Coat of arms

- Location within Italy Location within Emilia-Romagna
- Coordinates: 44°34′N 9°53′E
- Country: Italy
- Region: Emilia-Romagna
- Province: Parma (PR)
- Frazioni: Arsina, Cascina, Case Gatto, Case Lamini, Casella, Castellaro, Castoglio, Costa, Costadasino, Galella, Groppo San Siro, La Valle, Lennova, Maestri, Mormorola, Pieve di Gusaliggio, Roncotasco, Rovere, Rovina, San Martino, San Siro, Sozzi, Stazione Valmozzola, Tessi, Vettola

Government
  - Mayor: Claudio Alzapiedi

Area
  - Total: 67.7 km^{2} (26.1 sq mi)

Population (31 May 2007)
  - Total: 632
  - Density: 9.34/km^{2} (24.2/sq mi)
- Time zone: UTC+1 (CET)
  - Summer (DST): UTC+2 (CEST)
- Postal code: 43050
- Dialing code: 0525

Valmozzola (Parmigiano: Valmùsla) is a comune (municipality) in the Province of Parma in the Italian region Emilia-Romagna, located about 119 kilometres (74 mi) west of Bologna and about 45 kilometres (28 mi) southwest of Parma.

Valmozzola borders the following municipalities: Bardi, Berceto, Borgo Val di Taro, Solignano, Varsi.
