= Fornovo di Taro =

Fornovo di Taro Fornóv (Emilian)
- Comune
- Comune di Fornovo di Taro
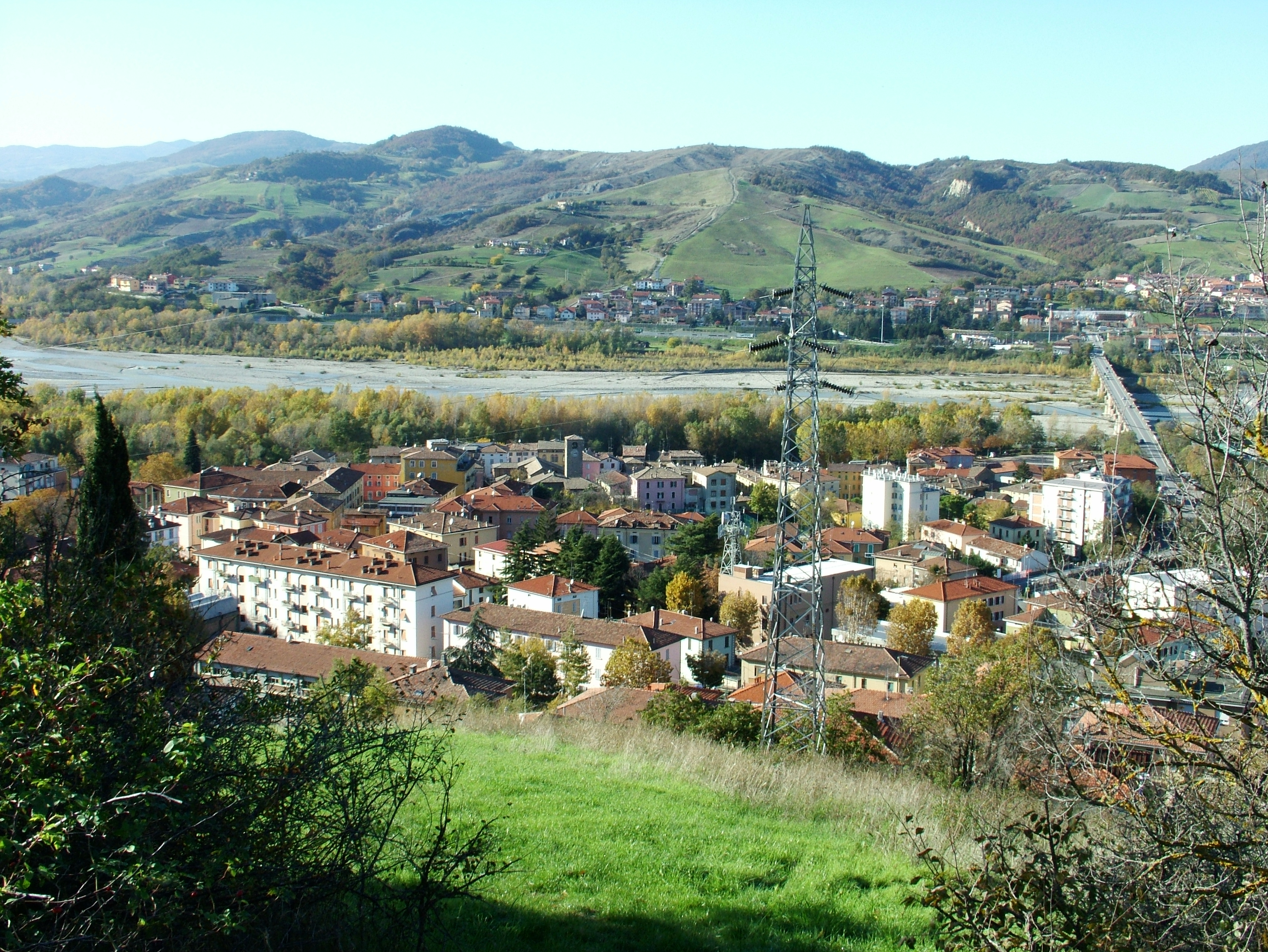

- Coat of arms

- Location within Italy Location within Emilia-Romagna
- Coordinates: 44°41′N 10°6′E
- Country: Italy
- Region: Emilia-Romagna
- Province: Parma (PR)
- Frazioni: Banzola, Cafragna, Camporosso, Case Borgheggiani, Caselle, Case Rosa, Case Stefanini, Citerna, Citerna Vecchia, Faseto, Fornace, La Costla, La Magnana, Le Capanne, Neviano de' Rossi, Osteriazza, Piantonia, Piazza, Provinciali, Respiccio, Riccò, Roncolongo, Salita-Riola, Sivizzano, Spagnano, Triano, Villanova, Vizzola

Government
  - Mayor: Michela Zanetti

Area
  - Total: 57.52 km^{2} (22.21 sq mi)
- Elevation: 158 m (518 ft)

Population (01/01/2019)
  - Total: 6,007
  - Density: 104.4/km^{2} (270.5/sq mi)
- Time zone: UTC+1 (CET)
  - Summer (DST): UTC+2 (CEST)
- Postal code: 43045
- Dialing code: 0525
- Website: Official website

Fornovo di Taro (Parmigiano: Fornóv) is a comune (municipality) in the province of Parma, in the Italian region Emilia-Romagna, located about 100 kilometres (62 mi) west of Bologna and about 25 kilometres (16 mi) southwest of Parma. The town lies on the east bank of the Taro River.

Fornovo di Taro borders the following municipalities: Collecchio, Medesano, Sala Baganza, Solignano, Terenzo, Varano de' Melegari. The Via Solferino bridge connects it to Ramiola on the other side of the river.

It is especially remembered as the seat of the Battle of Fornovo, fought in 1495 between the Italian league and the French troops of Charles VIII.

At the end of the Second World War, the commune was liberated from Nazi German and Italian fascist forces by Brazilian forces on 29 April 1945. The main church is Chiesa di Fornovo Taro. The town also houses the Romanesque architecture church of Santa Maria Assunta (9th-12th centuries).

== Population ==
There were 6007 inhabitants on 1 January 2019. At that time, there were 948 foreigners resident in the municipality, constituting 16% of the population. 54% of them are from African countries, 35% are from European countries and 9% from Asian countries. Below are the largest groups:

- Morocco: 272,
- Albania: 132,
- Romania: 126,
- Ghana: 80,
- Tunisia: 66,
- Moldova: 46,
- India: 32,
- Nigeria: 28,
- Ivory coast: 25,
- Ukraine: 21
