= Santa Maria Assunta a Fornovo =

Church building in Fornovo di Taro, Italy

Coordinates: 44.6913°N 10.0972°E

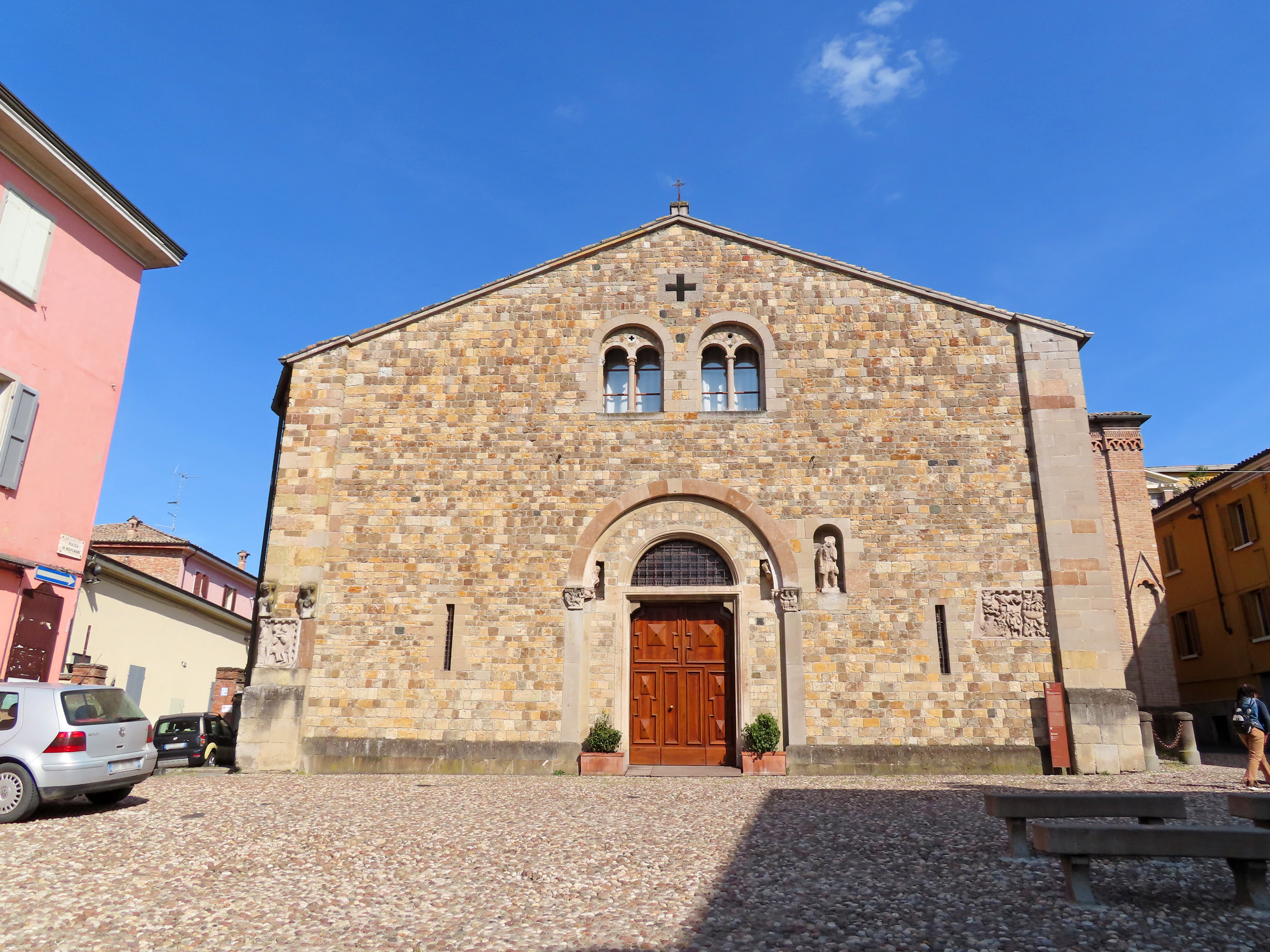

Santa Maria Assunta a Fornovo is a Romanesque-style, Roman Catholic parish church or pieve located in Fornovo di Taro in the region of Emilia Romagna, Italy.

== History ==
A church at the site is documented since 854, and was initially rebuilt in the 11th century. The bell-tower was added in 1302. The first two chapels were only added to the church in the 14th and 16th centuries. Further ones were added during reconstructions from 1712 to 1745. A reconstruction in 1927–1945, reverted the church and the facade to its Romanesque elements.

Part of a carved stone pulpit from the 11th century are now part of the facade. Other statuary dates from the 13th century. The main altarpiece depicts the Life of St Margaret.
