= Cisa Pass =

Mountain pass in Italy

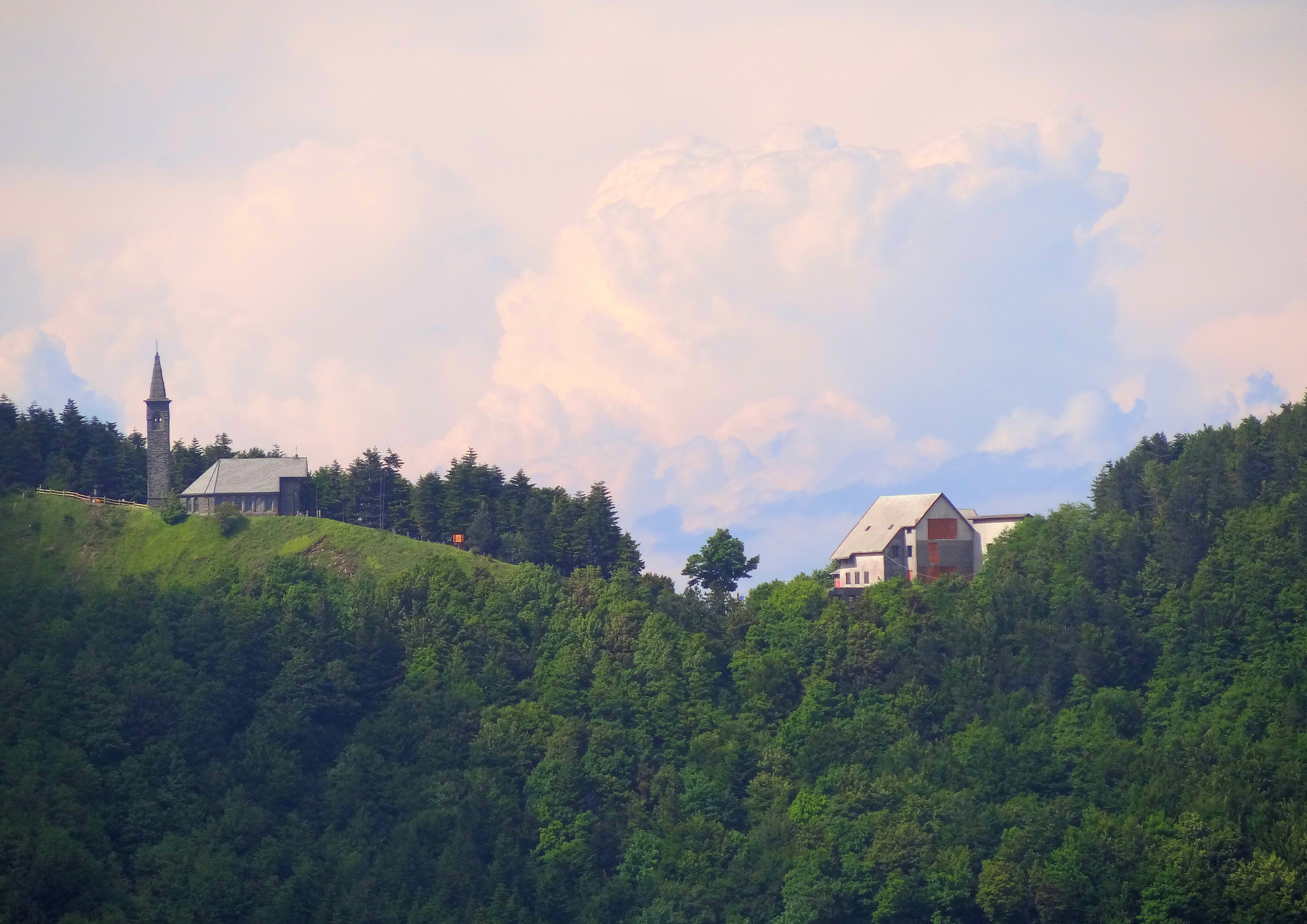
- The Cisa Pass seen from the south

- Location within Alps
- Elevation: 1,041 metres (3,415 ft)
- Traversed by: Italian Road 62 (Strada Statale 62 della Cisa)

Third Approach
- Location: Italy
- Range: Apennine Mountains
- Coordinates: 44°28′18″N 9°55′42″E

The Cisa Pass or La Cisa Pass is a mountain pass in Italy that marks the division between the Ligurian and Tuscan Apennines. It is located on the border between northern Tuscany (Province of Massa-Carrara) and Emilia-Romagna (Province of Parma), near the source of the Magra River at an altitude of 1,040 meters (3,414 feet) above sea level.

== Climate ==
Cisa's climate is classified as warm-summer mediterranean climate (Köppen: Csb). The annual average temperature is 8.3 °C (46.9 °F), the hottest month in July is 17.8 °C (64.0 °F), and the coldest month is 0.4 °C (32.7 °F) in February. The annual precipitation is 1,428.5 millimetres (56.24 in), of which October is the wettest with 202.3 millimetres (7.96 in), while July is the driest with only 42.4 millimetres (1.67 in).

Climate data for Passo Della Cisa, elevation: 1,039 m or 3,409 ft, 1981-2010 normals, extremes 1924–2018
Month	Jan	Feb	Mar	Apr	May	Jun	Jul	Aug	Sep	Oct	Nov	Dec	Year
Record high °C (°F)	15.0 (59.0)	15.0 (59.0)	18.4 (65.1)	22.3 (72.1)	25.8 (78.4)	29.5 (85.1)	31.8 (89.2)	32.6 (90.7)	27.4 (81.3)	22.0 (71.6)	18.0 (64.4)	15.4 (59.7)	32.6 (90.7)
Mean daily maximum °C (°F)	2.5 (36.5)	2.6 (36.7)	6.0 (42.8)	9.2 (48.6)	14.4 (57.9)	18.0 (64.4)	21.2 (70.2)	20.8 (69.4)	15.7 (60.3)	11.1 (52.0)	6.0 (42.8)	3.5 (38.3)	10.9 (51.6)
Daily mean °C (°F)	0.4 (32.7)	0.4 (32.7)	3.4 (38.1)	6.4 (43.5)	11.2 (52.2)	14.7 (58.5)	17.8 (64.0)	17.6 (63.7)	13.1 (55.6)	9.1 (48.4)	4.2 (39.6)	1.4 (34.5)	8.3 (46.9)
Mean daily minimum °C (°F)	−1.8 (28.8)	−1.9 (28.6)	0.8 (33.4)	3.6 (38.5)	8.1 (46.6)	11.5 (52.7)	14.3 (57.7)	14.4 (57.9)	10.4 (50.7)	7.1 (44.8)	2.4 (36.3)	−0.8 (30.6)	5.7 (42.3)
Record low °C (°F)	−18.8 (−1.8)	−18.0 (−0.4)	−15.4 (4.3)	−6.0 (21.2)	−4.4 (24.1)	1.7 (35.1)	4.0 (39.2)	5.0 (41.0)	1.6 (34.9)	−5.8 (21.6)	−10.3 (13.5)	−13.0 (8.6)	−18.8 (−1.8)
Average precipitation mm (inches)	122.8 (4.83)	85.3 (3.36)	100.1 (3.94)	167.3 (6.59)	106.6 (4.20)	84.5 (3.33)	42.4 (1.67)	58.8 (2.31)	120.7 (4.75)	202.3 (7.96)	200.7 (7.90)	137.0 (5.39)	1,428.6 (56.24)
Average precipitation days (≥ 1.0 mm)	8.8	7.0	8.5	11.2	9.2	7.6	5.2	5.7	8.1	10.9	10.4	8.7	101.2
Average dew point °C (°F)	−3.0 (26.6)	−3.3 (26.1)	−0.6 (30.9)	2.6 (36.7)	7.0 (44.6)	10.7 (51.3)	12.8 (55.0)	12.9 (55.2)	8.8 (47.8)	6.1 (43.0)	1.6 (34.9)	−1.7 (28.9)	4.5 (40.1)
Mean monthly sunshine hours	125.9	129.8	166.7	175.5	206.4	250.2	305.1	270.5	201.6	164.8	122.3	114.0	2,232.9
Source 1: NOAA
Source 2: Temperature estreme in Toscana

== See also ==
- List of highest paved roads in Europe
- List of mountain passes
