= Erreà =

Italian sports equipment company supplier

Erreà Sport S.p.A.
- Type: Private
- Industry: Sports equipment
- Founded: 1988; 38 years ago
- Founder: Angelo Gandolfi
- Headquarters: Torrile, Italy
- Area served: Worldwide
- Products: Clothing, athletic shoes
- Website: errea.com

Erreà (pronounced [ˌɛrreˈa]) is an Italian sports equipment supplier. Erreà was the first Italian sportswear company to be accredited with the Oeko-tex standard certification, which assures that garments textiles are free from harmful chemicals.

== Background ==
Established in 1988, Erreà's world headquarters are in San Polo di Torrile, just outside Parma. It was founded by Angelo Gandolfi, who remains president today.

Erreà entered the English football market in 1994, signing a deal with then Premier League side Middlesbrough that lasted for many years. Erreà were the kit manufacturer for Burnley Football Club from the 2005/06 championship season through to their first promotion to the Premier League in 2009/10. The company also signed a deal to supply Norwich City with equipment in 2011.

It celebrated its 25th anniversary in 2013 with the presentation of its key footballing clients' shirts for the next season. Parma, Atalanta, Norwich City, Brighton, Blackpool, Rayo Vallecano, Numancia, Alcorcón, ADO Den Haag and Nantes were the teams represented.

The current kit supplier for the Malta national football team is Errea. They have held this role since 2022 under the UEFA Kit Assistance Scheme, providing kits for the 2022-2025 and 2024-2026 periods.

== See also ==
Excludes articles found in Category:Sporting goods manufacturers of Italy.

- Sergio Tacchini
