= Terenzo =

- Comune
- Comune di Terenzo
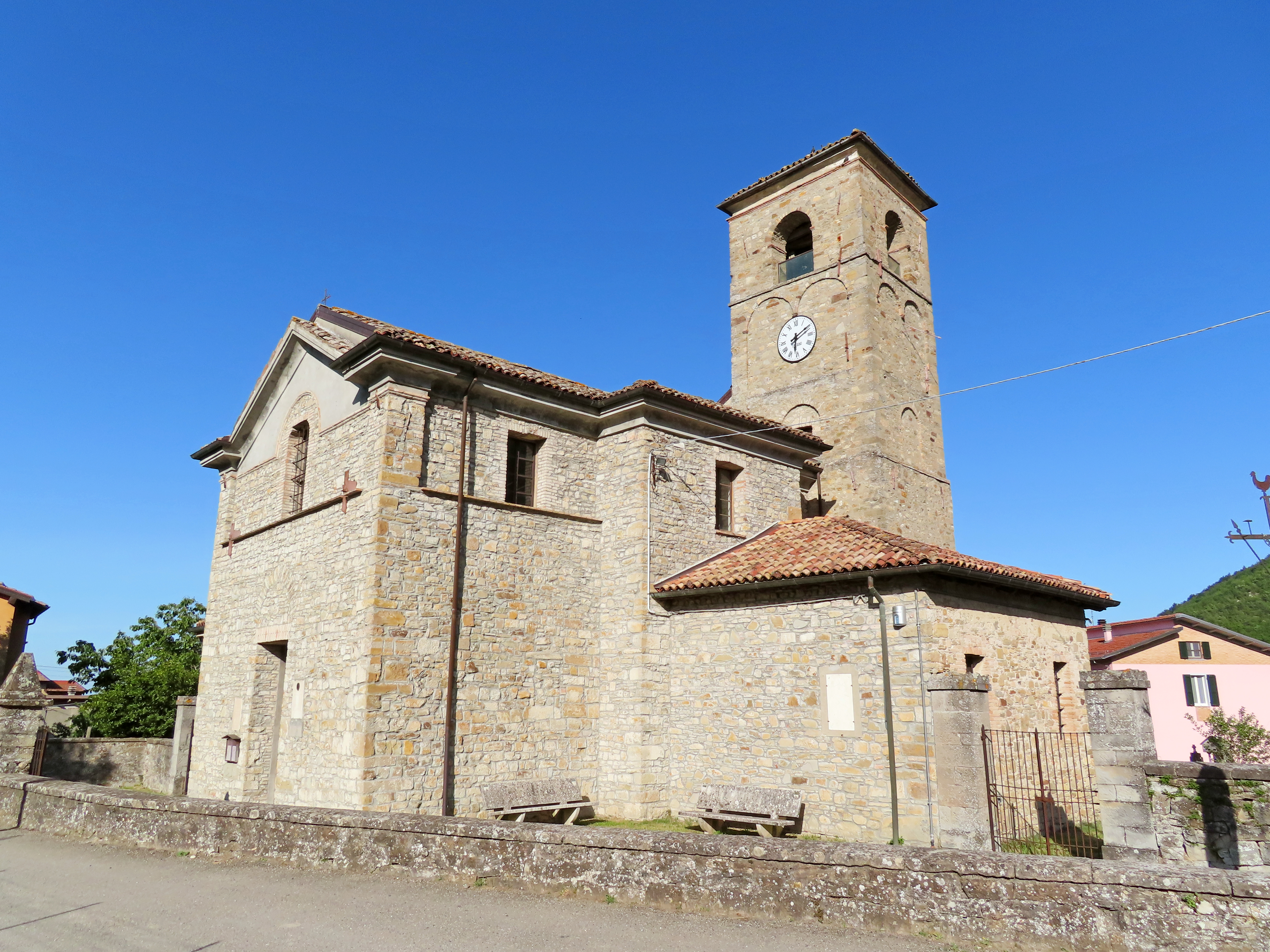
- Santo Stefano

- Location within Italy Location within Emilia-Romagna
- Coordinates: 44°37′N 10°5′E
- Country: Italy
- Region: Emilia-Romagna
- Province: Province of Parma (PR)
- Frazioni: Bardone, Boschi di Bardone, Case Castellani, Cassio, Castello, Castello di Casola, Cazzola, Corniana, Goiano, Lesignano Palmia, Lughero, Palmia, Puilio, Selva Grossa, Stazione Bocchetto, Villa, Villa di Casola, Viola

Area
  - Total: 72.4 km^{2} (28.0 sq mi)

Population (Dec. 2004)
  - Total: 1,250
  - Density: 17.3/km^{2} (44.7/sq mi)
- Time zone: UTC+1 (CET)
  - Summer (DST): UTC+2 (CEST)
- Postal code: 43040
- Dialing code: 0525
- Website: Official website

Terenzo (Parmigiano: Tréns) is a comune (municipality) in the Province of Parma in the Italian region Emilia-Romagna, located about 100 kilometres (62 mi) west of Bologna and about 30 kilometres (19 mi) southwest of Parma. As of 31 December 2004, it had a population of 1,250 and an area of 72.4 square kilometres (28.0 mi^{2}).

The municipality of Terenzo contains the frazioni (subdivisions, mainly villages and hamlets) Bardone, Boschi di Bardone, Case Castellani, Cassio, Castello, Castello di Casola, Cazzola, Corniana, Goiano, Lesignano Palmia, Lughero, Palmia, Puilio, Selva Grossa, Stazione Bocchetto, Villa, Casola, and Viola.

At the foot of Monte Zirone, is the slender former church or Pieve di San Michele di Corniana, dedicate to St Michael Archangel. Also nearby is the Pieve di Bardone, completed prior to 13th-century.

Terenzo borders the following municipalities: Berceto, Calestano, Fornovo di Taro, Sala Baganza, Solignano.

== Demographic evolution ==
Historical population

Year	Pop.	±%
1861	3,245	—
1871	3,352	+3.3%
1881	3,640	+8.6%
1901	3,785	+4.0%
1911	3,668	−3.1%

Year	Pop.	±%
1921	3,840	+4.7%
1931	3,668	−4.5%
1936	3,537	−3.6%
1951	3,215	−9.1%
1961	2,490	−22.6%

Year	Pop.	±%
1971	1,597	−35.9%
1981	1,388	−13.1%
1991	1,319	−5.0%
2001	1,289	−2.3%

Source: Data from ISTAT
