= Bardi, Emilia-Romagna =

Bardi
- Comune
- Comune di Bardi
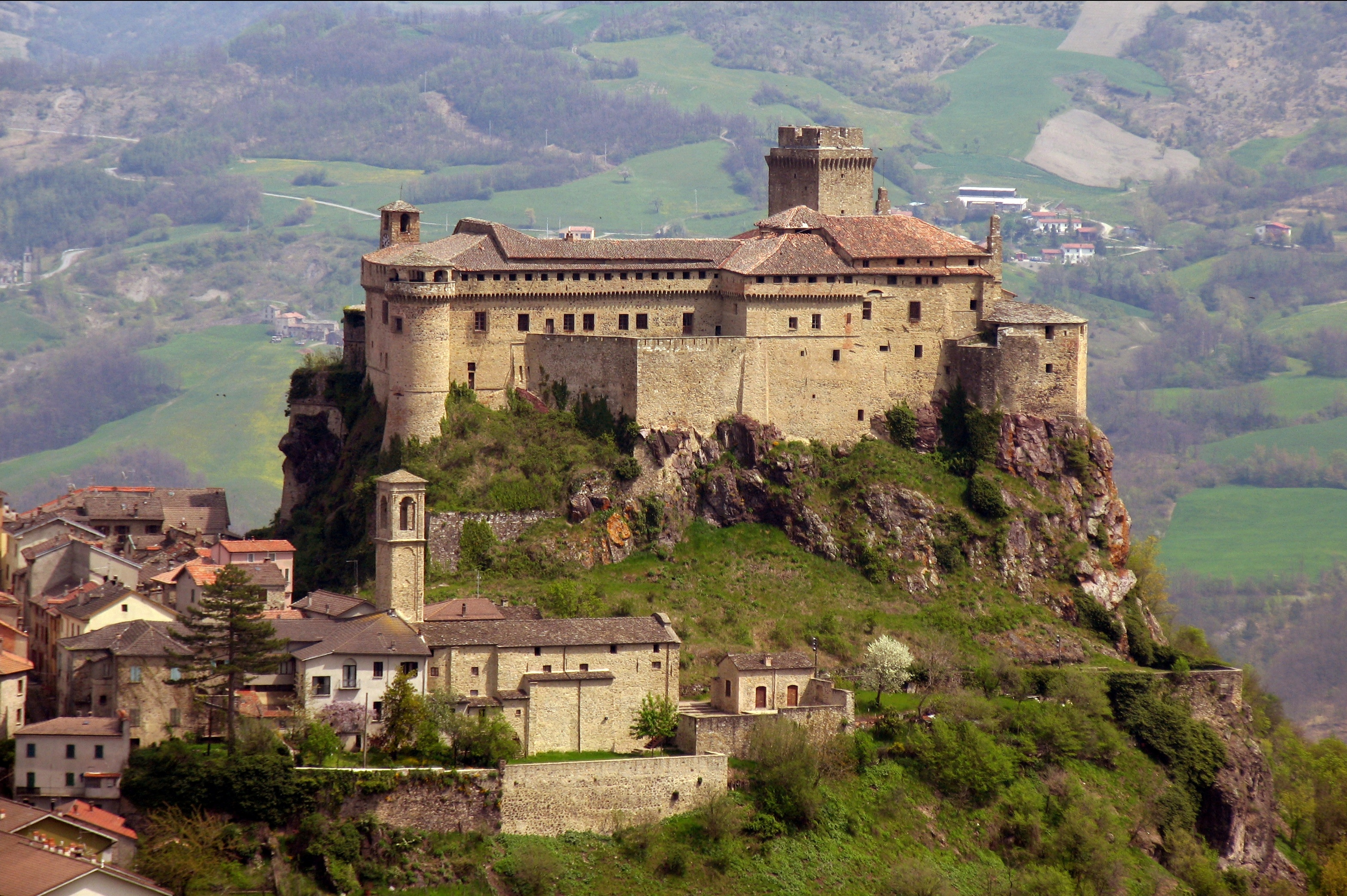
- The Castle of Bardi

- Coat of arms

- Location within Italy Location within Emilia-Romagna
- Coordinates: 44°38′N 9°44′E
- Country: Italy
- Region: Emilia-Romagna
- Province: Parma (PR)
- Frazioni: Assirati, Bazzini, Bergazzi, Berlini, Bertonazzi, Boccolo, Bosini, Bre, Brugnoli, Caberra, Cacrovoli, Caneto, Cantiga, Caprile, Carpana, Casanova, Case Ini, Case Soprane, Cavallare, Cerreto, Chiesabianca, Cogno, Credarola, Cogno Grezzo, Comune Soprano, Costa, Cremadasca, Diamanti, Dorbora, Faccini, Faggio, Fantoni, Ferrari, Filippini, Franchini, Frassineto, Gabriellini, Gazzo, Geminiano, Granelli, Granere, Gravago, Grezzo, Lezzara, Lobbie, Moglie, Monastero, Noveglia, Osacca, Panigaro, Pareto, Piana Gazzo, Pianelletto, Pieve, Pione, Ponteceno di sopra, Romei, Roncole, Rossi, Rugarlo, Saliceto, Santa Giustina, Segarati, Sidolo, Tanugola, Taverna, Tiglio, Vicanini, Vischetto di Là, Vosina

Government
  - Mayor: Valentina Pontremoli

Area
  - Total: 190.1 km^{2} (73.4 sq mi)
- Elevation: 625 m (2,051 ft)

Population (31 July 2022)
  - Total: 1,994
  - Density: 10.49/km^{2} (27.17/sq mi)
- Demonym: Bardigiani
- Time zone: UTC+1 (CET)
  - Summer (DST): UTC+2 (CEST)
- Postal code: 43032
- Dialing code: 0525
- Patron saint: St. John the Baptist
- Saint day: June 24
- Website: Official website

Bardi (Emilian: Bàrdi) is a comune (municipality) in the Province of Parma in the Italian region Emilia-Romagna, located about 130 kilometres (81 mi) west of Bologna and about 50 kilometres (31 mi) southwest of Parma, in the upper Ceno valley at the confluence of the rivers Ceno and Noveglia. It is dominated by the imposing Landi Castle built over a spur of red jasper.

Bardi borders the following municipalities: Bedonia, Bore, Borgo Val di Taro, Compiano, Farini, Ferriere, Morfasso, Valmozzola, Varsi.

== History ==
According to a legend, the town's name derives from "Bardus", or "Barrio", the last elephant of Hannibal's army, who supposedly died here during the march to Rome. Historically, the name stems from the Lombard nobility who established themselves in Bardi around 600 AD. In 1000 the bishop of Piacenza took up residence here.

In 1257 the Landi of Piacenza acquired it, remaining lord of Bardi for the following four centuries. In 1269 the castle was stormed by an army led by Alberto Fontana, and the commune of Piacenza held it until 1307, when Emperor Henry VII gave it back to Umbertino II Landi. Galeazzo I Visconti of Milan obtained a notable victory over the Guelphs in the vicinity on November 29, 1321. In 1381 the Landi were declared formally independent by Gian Galeazzo Visconti, and obtained a complete autonomy in 1415.

Federico and his daughter Polissena Bardi renewed the castle in the 16th-17th century, also establishing a college of notaries which lasted until 1805. In 1682 Polissena's son Dario ceded Bardi to Ranuccio II Farnese, Duke of Parma and Piacenza, and the town followed the story of the latter until the unification of Italy.

From the late 19th to the 20th century, much of the town's population emigrated to France, Switzerland, Belgium and particularly Wales, where they had a notable impact on Welsh life. Today many Welsh Italians return to Emilia Romagna for short breaks and as a second home.

During World War II the area saw numerous clashes between the German occupants and the partisans, the city being bombed by 12 Stukas on July 17, 1944.

== Main sights ==
- Castello dei Landi
- Parish Church of San Giovanni Battista (16th century)
- Parish Church of Santa Maria Addolorata (20th century)
- Oratory of Santa Maria delle Grazie (13th century) - It houses an early work by Mannerist painter Parmigianino, the Bardi Altarpiece (1521)
- Parish Church San Martino Dicatum (Localita Rugarlo di Bardi)
- Parish Church of Santa Maria Assunta - 900AD - (Frazione Casanova di Bardi)
- Chapel dedicated to San Siro
- Memorial Chapel of the Arandora Star (20th century)
- River Ceno
- Frazione Gravago di Bardi - There is a castle here built in the 8th century and owned by the Landi.
- Oratorio della Beata Vergine di Pompei
- The Mechanical Bear situated in Via Provinciale. A few people make it a tradition to have their photo taken whilst astride the bear every time they visit. They say it brings good fortune and virility although it is unproven.

== Notable people ==
- Aldo Berni, founder, Berni Inn restaurant chain
- Walter Belli, World Champion MTB rider.
- Andrea Pontremoli, former president and CEO of IBM Europe and now CEO and General Manager of Dallara Racing
