= Torrile =

- Comune
- Comune di Torrile
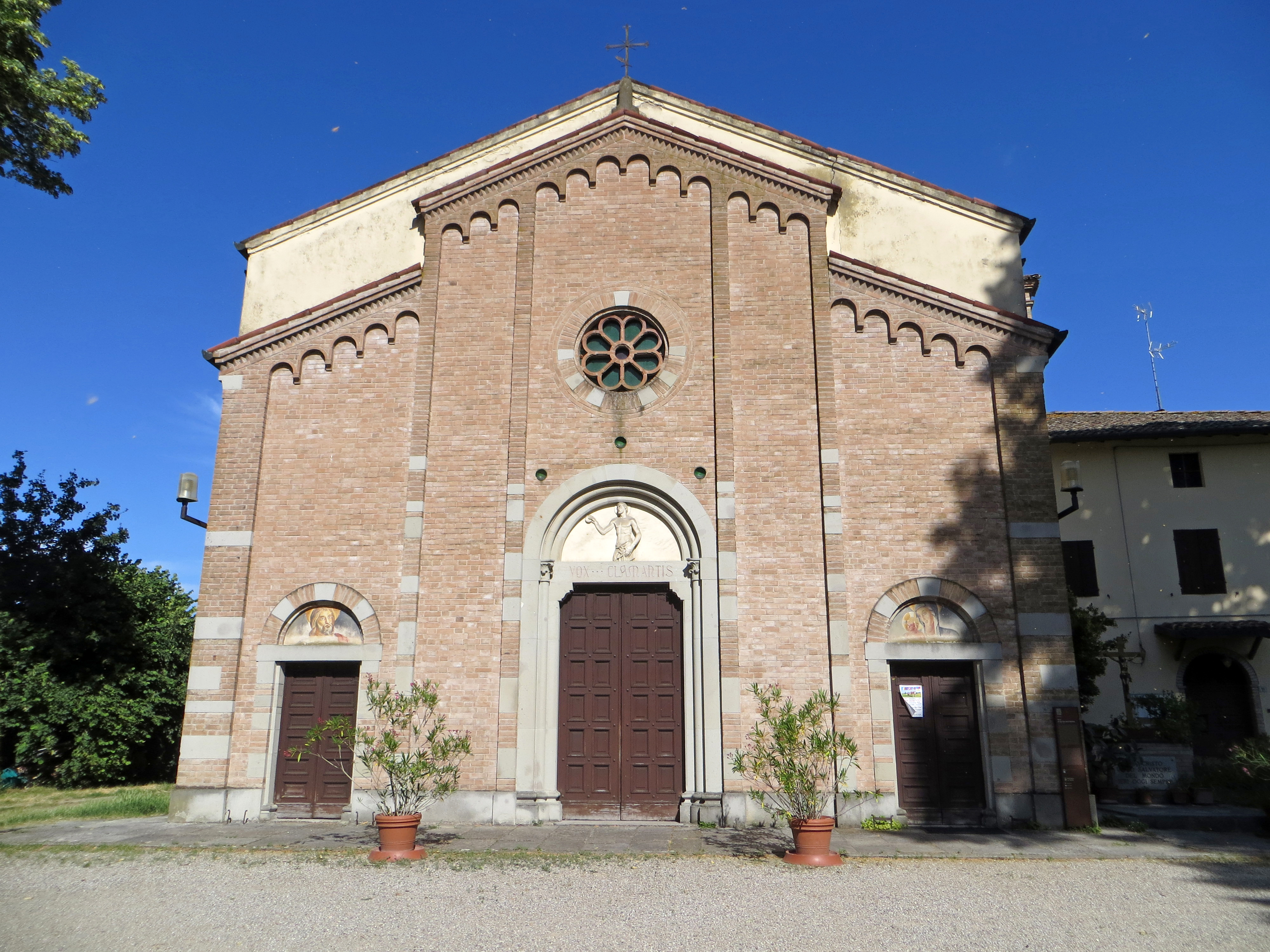
- The pieve of St. John the Baptist.

- Coat of arms

- Location within Italy Location within Emilia-Romagna
- Coordinates: 44°55′N 10°19′E
- Country: Italy
- Region: Emilia-Romagna
- Province: Parma (PR)
- Frazioni: Bezze, Borgazzo-Ca'Scipioni, Gainago Ariana, Quartiere Minari, Rivarolo, San Polo (municipal seat), San Siro, Sant'Andrea

Government
  - Mayor: Alessandro Fadda

Area
  - Total: 37.15 km^{2} (14.34 sq mi)
- Elevation: 32 m (105 ft)

Population (30 September 2016)
  - Total: 7,741
  - Density: 208.4/km^{2} (539.7/sq mi)
- Demonym: Torrilesi
- Time zone: UTC+1 (CET)
  - Summer (DST): UTC+2 (CEST)
- Postal code: 43030
- Dialing code: 0521
- Patron saint: St. Blaise
- Saint day: February 3
- Website: Official website

Torrile (Parmigiano: Toril) is a comune (municipality) in the Province of Parma in the Italian region Emilia-Romagna, located about 90 kilometres (56 mi) northwest of Bologna and about 13 kilometres (8 mi) north of Parma.

Torrile borders the following municipalities: Colorno, Mezzani, Parma, Sissa Trecasali.

== Main sights ==
In the comune is the pieve of Gainago, known from 1144 and dedicated to St. John the Baptist. It houses 13th-century frescoes with a Deposition, Saint and Madonna with Child. Another sight is the Torre ("Tower") from which the commune takes its name, located in the frazione of Gainago. The patrician Villa Balduino-Serra is home to a large garden and park.

== Economy ==
The town is home to Erreà, which is one of the leading sportswear producers of Italy.
