= Albareto =

- Comune
- Comune di Albareto
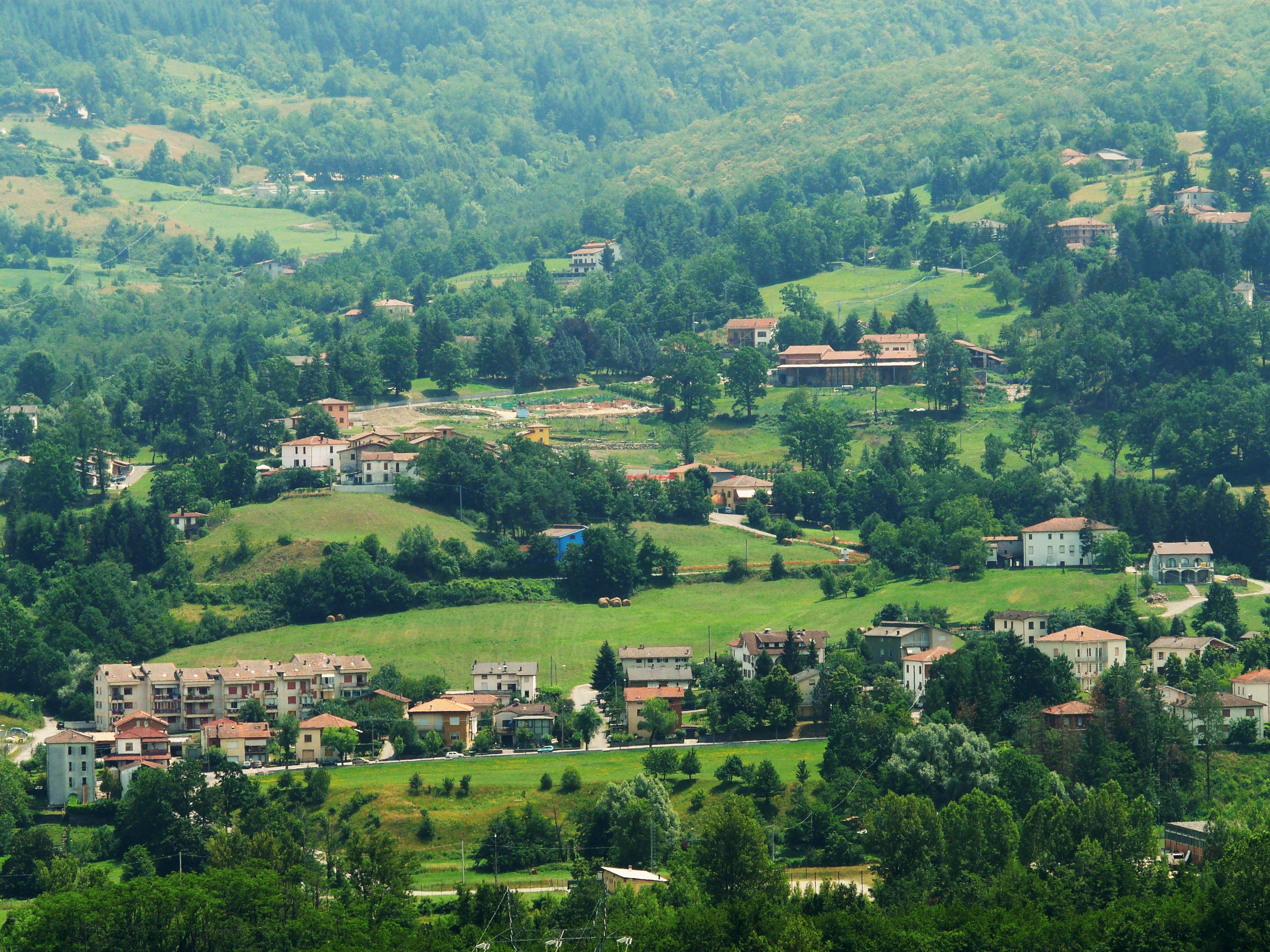

- Coat of arms

- Location of Albareto in Italy Albareto (Emilia-Romagna)
- Coordinates: 44°27′N 9°42′E
- Country: Italy
- Region: Emilia-Romagna
- Province: Parma (PR)
- Frazioni: Bertorella, Boschetto, Buzzò, Cacciarasca, Campi, Case Bozzini, Caselle, Case Mazzetta, Case Mirani, Codogno, Folta, Gotra, Il Costello, Lazzarè, Le Moie, Montegroppo, Pieve di Campi, Pistoi, Ponte Scodellino, Roncole, San Quirico, Spallavera, Squarci, Torre

Government
  - Mayor: Davide Riccoboni

Area
  - Total: 103.9 km^{2} (40.1 sq mi)
- Elevation: 512 m (1,680 ft)

Population (30 April 2017)
  - Total: 2,149
  - Density: 20.68/km^{2} (53.57/sq mi)
- Demonym: Albaretesi
- Time zone: UTC+1 (CET)
  - Summer (DST): UTC+2 (CEST)
- Postal code: 43051
- Dialing code: 0525
- Website: Official website

Albareto (Parmigiano: Albarèjj) is a comune (municipality) in the Province of Parma in the Italian region Emilia-Romagna, located about 130 kilometres (81 mi) west of Bologna and about 60 kilometres (37 mi) southwest of Parma.

Albareto borders the following municipalities: Borgo Val di Taro, Compiano, Pontremoli, Sesta Godano, Tornolo, Varese Ligure, Zeri.
