= Calestano =

- Comune
- Comune di Calestano
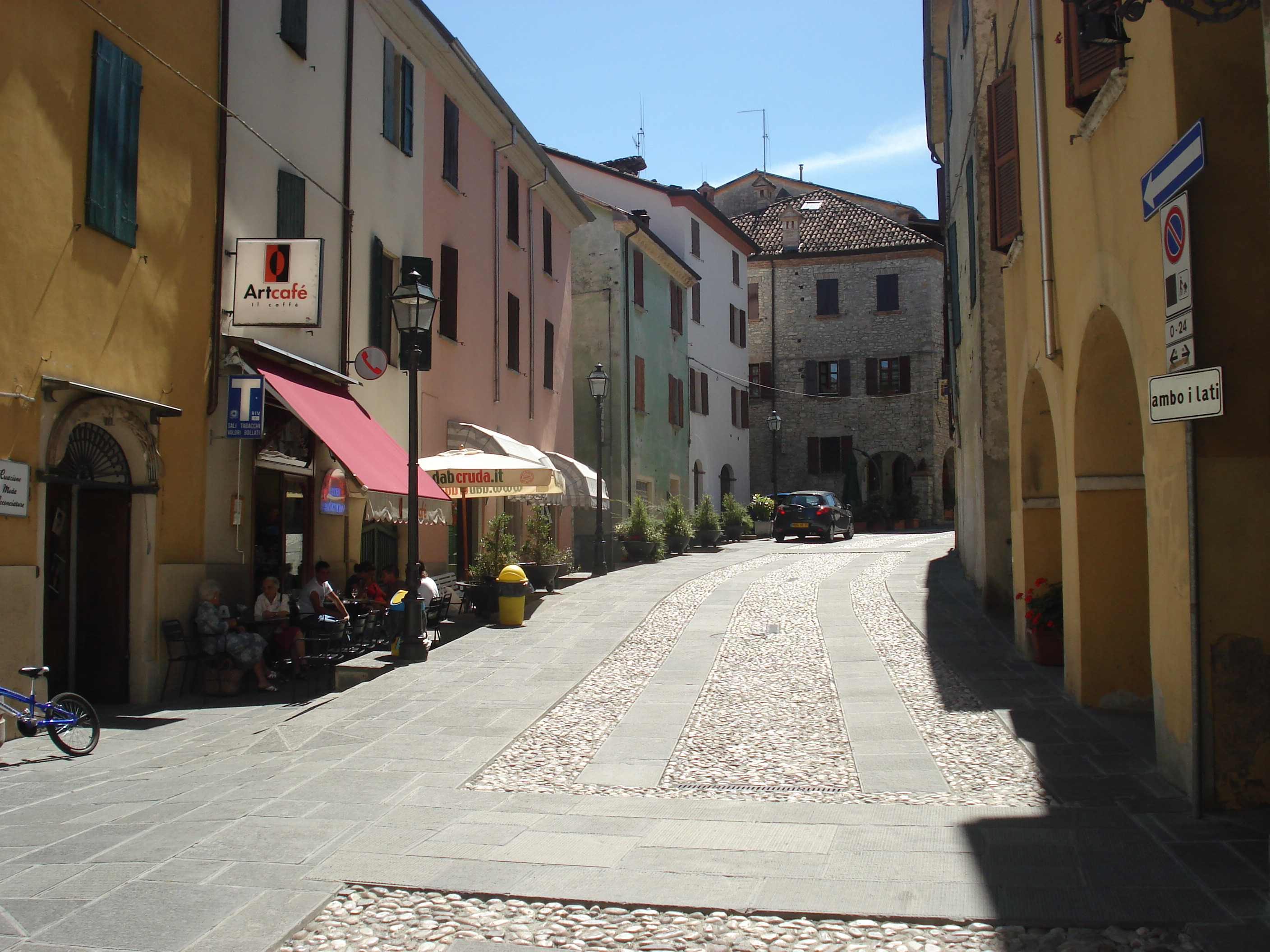

- Location within Italy Location within Emilia-Romagna
- Coordinates: 44°36′N 10°7′E
- Country: Italy
- Region: Emilia-Romagna
- Province: Parma (PR)
- Frazioni: Borsano, Canesano, Cascina, Castello, Chiastre, Fragno, Fragnolatico, Fragnolo, La Costa, Linara, Marzolara, Montale, Pioppone, Ramiano, Ravarano, Ronzano, San Remigio, Torre, Vallerano, Vigolone

Government
  - Mayor: Francesco Peschiera

Area
  - Total: 57.36 km^{2} (22.15 sq mi)
- Elevation: 417 m (1,368 ft)

Population (30 April 2017)
  - Total: 2,127
  - Density: 37.08/km^{2} (96.04/sq mi)
- Demonym: Calestanesi
- Time zone: UTC+1 (CET)
  - Summer (DST): UTC+2 (CEST)
- Postal code: 43030
- Dialing code: 0525
- Website: Official website

Calestano (Parmigiano: Calistan) is a comune (municipality) in the Province of Parma in the Italian region Emilia-Romagna, located about 100 kilometres (62 mi) west of Bologna and about 30 kilometres (19 mi) southwest of Parma.

Calestano borders the following municipalities: Berceto, Corniglio, Felino, Langhirano, Sala Baganza, Terenzo.
