= Noceto =

- Comune
- Comune di Noceto
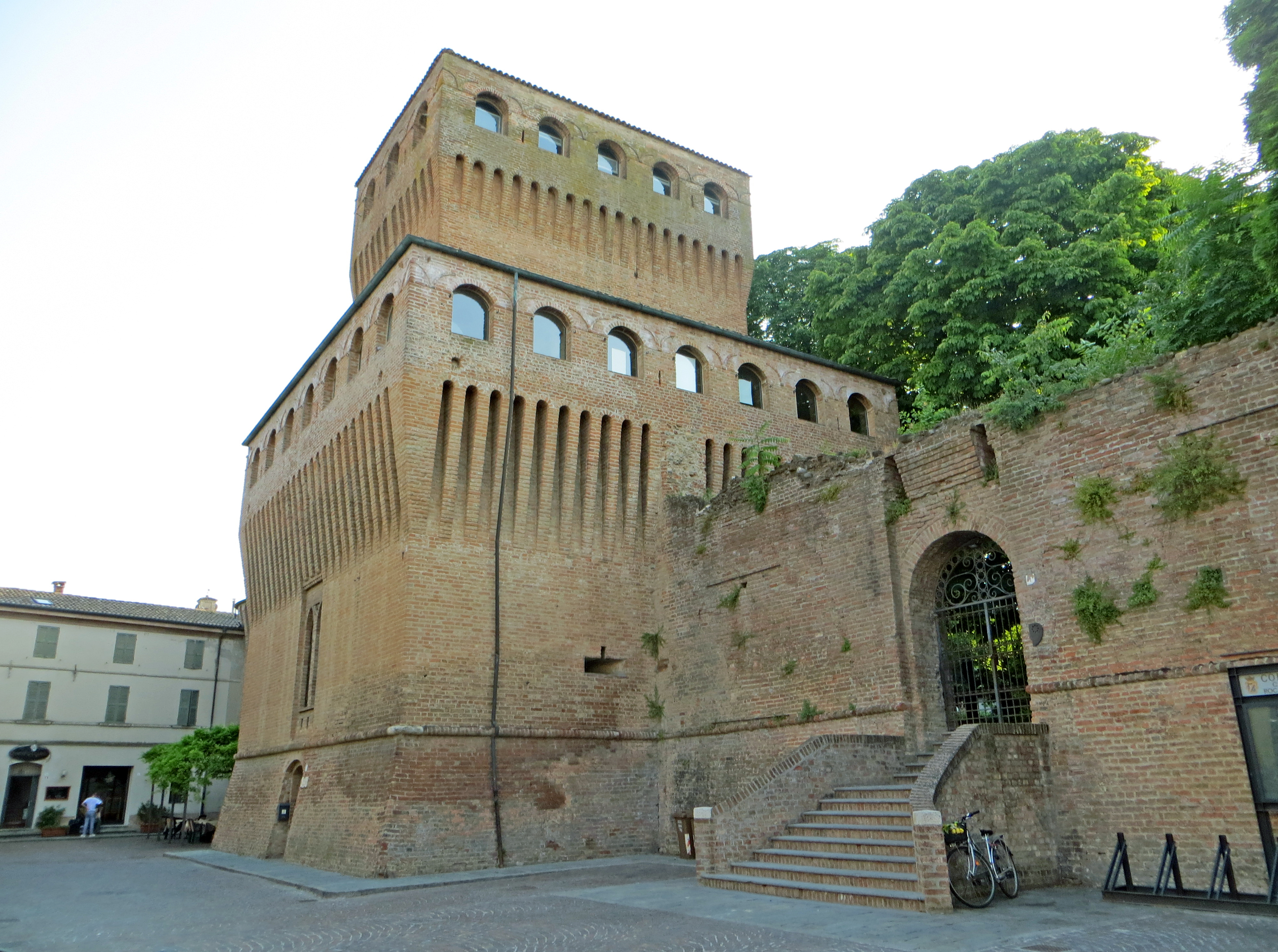
- Noceto: the fortress

- Location within Italy Location within Emilia-Romagna
- Coordinates: 44°49′N 10°11′E
- Country: Italy
- Region: Emilia-Romagna
- Province: Parma (PR)
- Frazioni: Borghetto, Cella, Costamezzana, Ponte Taro, Sanguinaro

Government
  - Mayor: Fabio Fecci

Area
  - Total: 79.6 km^{2} (30.7 sq mi)
- Elevation: 74 m (243 ft)

Population (31 December 2021)
  - Total: 13,155
  - Density: 165/km^{2} (428/sq mi)
- Demonym: Nocetano
- Time zone: UTC+1 (CET)
  - Summer (DST): UTC+2 (CEST)
- Postal code: 43015
- Dialing code: 0521
- Website: Official website

Noceto (Parmigiano: Nozèi) is a comune (municipality) in the province of Parma in the Italian region Emilia-Romagna, located about 100 kilometres (62 mi) northwest of Bologna and about 12 kilometres (7 mi) west of Parma.

The municipality of Noceto contains the frazioni (subdivisions, mainly villages and hamlets) Borghetto, Cella, Costamezzana, Ponte Taro and Sanguinaro.

Noceto borders the following municipalities: Collecchio, Fidenza, Fontanellato, Fontevivo, Medesano, Parma.

== Twin towns ==
- (United States) Walnut Creek, USA, since 1987
- Noyers-sur-Serein, France, since
