= Tornolo =

- Comune
- Comune di Tornolo
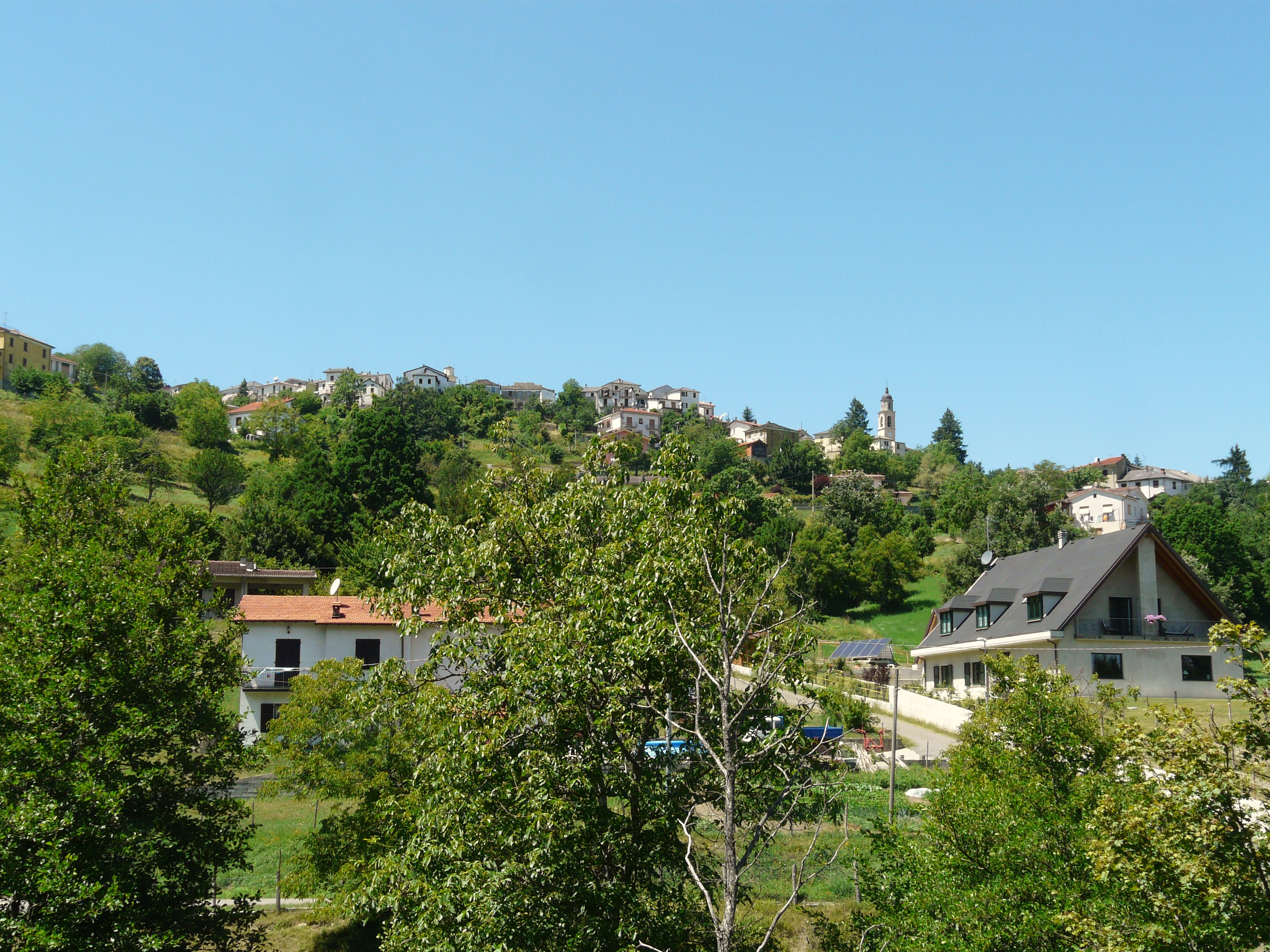
- Tornolo

- Location within Italy Location within Emilia-Romagna
- Coordinates: 44°29′N 9°38′E
- Country: Italy
- Region: Emilia-Romagna
- Province: Province of Parma (PR)
- Frazioni: Barca, Boresasco, Campeggi, Casale, Case Belloni, Case Fazzi, Case Lasine, Casello, Casoni, Cerosa, Codorso, Giungareggio, I Massi, Isorelli, Marzuola, Menta, Morgallo, Pianazzo, Pianlavagnolo, Pontestrambo, Ravezza, Santa Maria del Taro, Sbarbori, Squeri, Tarsogno, Torre, Vannini

Government
  - Mayor: Maria Cristina Cardinali

Area
  - Total: 69.4 km^{2} (26.8 sq mi)

Population (31 December 2015)
  - Total: 1,010
  - Density: 14.6/km^{2} (37.7/sq mi)
- Time zone: UTC+1 (CET)
  - Summer (DST): UTC+2 (CEST)
- Postal code: 43059
- Dialing code: 0525

Tornolo (Ligurian: Tùrneru; Parmigiano: Tornol) is a comune (municipality) in the Province of Parma in the Italian region Emilia-Romagna, located about 140 kilometres (87 mi) west of Bologna and about 70 kilometres (43 mi) southwest of Parma.

Tornolo borders the following municipalities: Albareto, Bedonia, Borzonasca, Compiano, Mezzanego, Santo Stefano d'Aveto, Varese Ligure.
