= Pellegrino Parmense =

- Comune
- Comune di Pellegrino Parmense
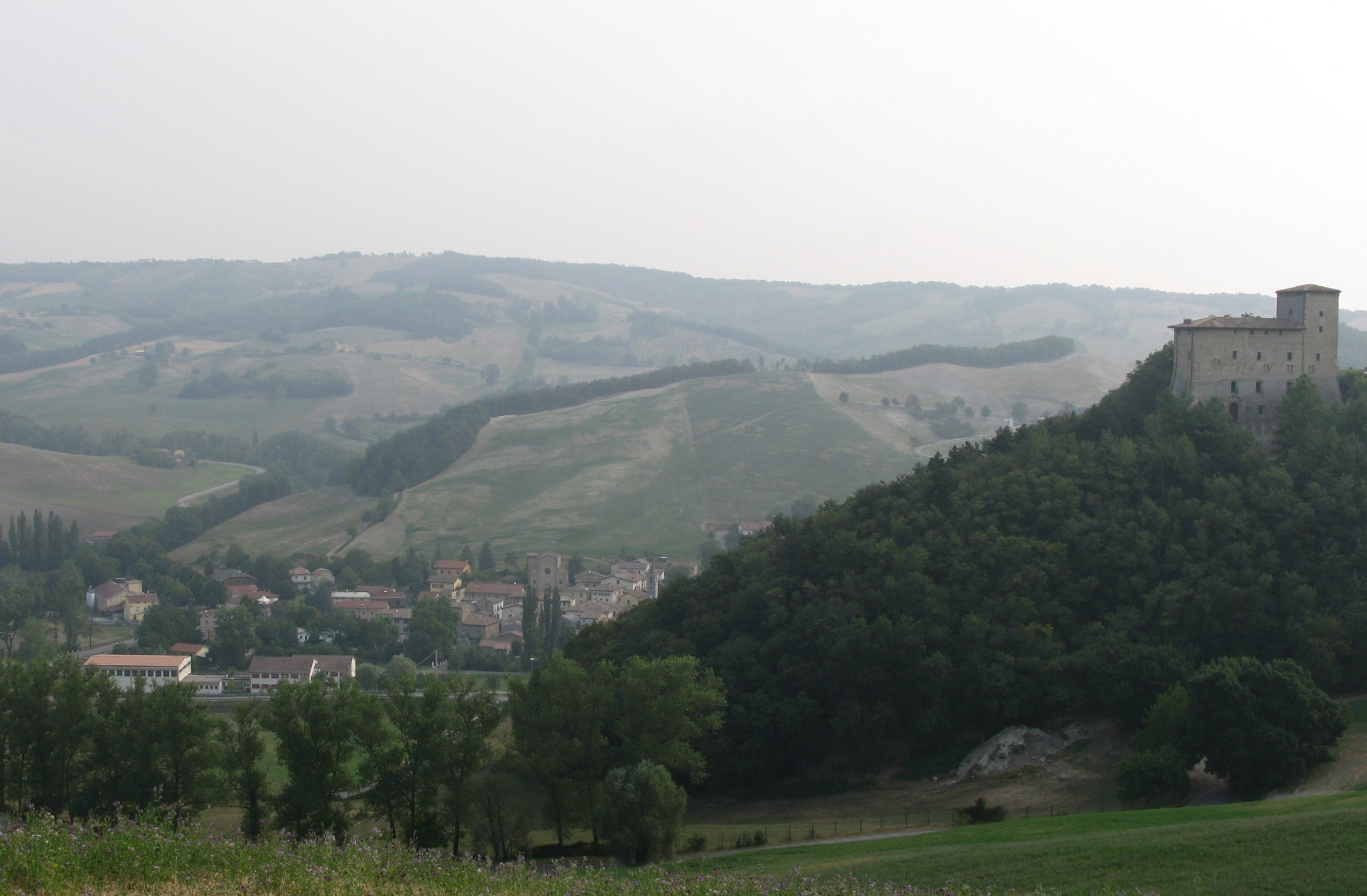

- Location within Italy Location within Emilia-Romagna
- Coordinates: 44°43′56″N 9°55′44″E
- Country: Italy
- Region: Emilia-Romagna
- Province: Parma (PR)
- Frazioni: Aione di Sopra, Aione Sotto, Berzieri, Casalino, Casalicchio, Castellaro, Cavallo, Ceriato Lobbia, Grotta, Iggio, Mariano Case-Dell'Asta, Marubbi, Montanari, Pietra Nera, Pietraspaccata, Rigollo, Sant'Antonio, Santini, Stuzzano, Varone, Vigoleni

Government
  - Mayor: Alberto Canepari

Area
  - Total: 82.4 km^{2} (31.8 sq mi)

Population (31 May 2007)
  - Total: 1,182
  - Density: 14.3/km^{2} (37.2/sq mi)
- Time zone: UTC+1 (CET)
  - Summer (DST): UTC+2 (CEST)
- Postal code: 43047
- Dialing code: 0524
- Website: Official website

Pellegrino Parmense (Parmigiano: Pelegrén) is a comune (municipality) in the Province of Parma in the Italian region Emilia-Romagna, located about 120 kilometres (75 mi) west of Bologna and about 35 kilometres (22 mi) west of Parma, in the northern part of the Valle del Ceno.
