= Bore, Emilia-Romagna =

Bore
- Comune
- Comune di Bore
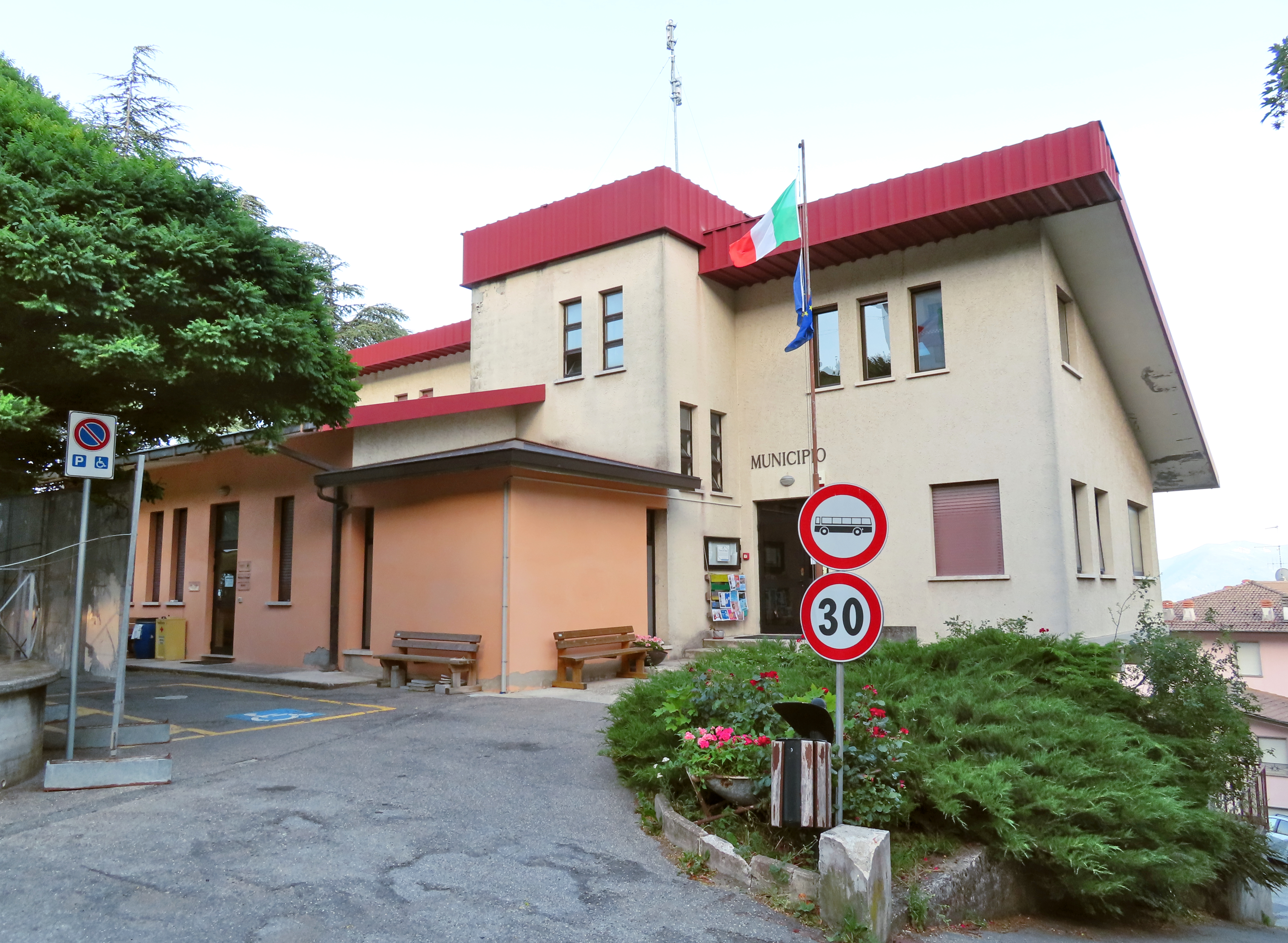
- Town hall

- Coat of arms

- Location within Italy Location within Emilia-Romagna
- Coordinates: 44°43′N 9°48′E
- Country: Italy
- Region: Emilia-Romagna
- Province: Parma (PR)
- Frazioni: Bellaria, Castiglione, Felloni, Ferrari, Fiori, Franchi-Salvi, Luneto, Metti, Mortarelli, Orsi, Pereto, Pozzolo, Pratogrande, Raffi, Ralli, Rovina, Silva, Zani, Zermani

Government
  - Mayor: Diego Giusti (Lega party)

Area
  - Total: 43 km^{2} (17 sq mi)

Population (31 May 2007)
  - Total: 833
  - Density: 19/km^{2} (50/sq mi)
- Time zone: UTC+1 (CET)
  - Summer (DST): UTC+2 (CEST)
- Postal code: 43030
- Dialing code: 0525
- Website: Official website

Bore (Parmigiano: Bori or Bòre; Piacentino: Böri; locally In-t-i Böre) is a comune in the province of Parma, Emilia-Romagna, central Italy. It is 832 metres (2,730 ft) above sea level.
