= Varano de' Melegari =

- Comune
- Comune di Varano de' Melegari
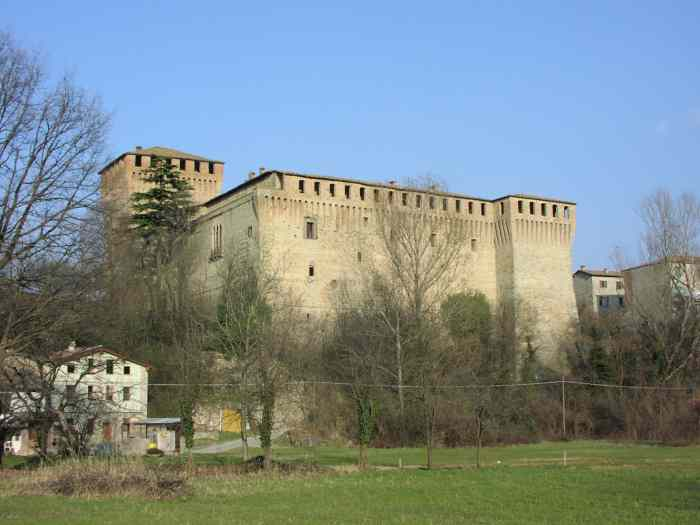
- Castle Pallavicino.

- Coat of arms

- Location within Italy Location within Emilia-Romagna
- Coordinates: 44°41′N 10°1′E
- Country: Italy
- Region: Emilia-Romagna
- Province: Parma (PR)
- Frazioni: Boschi, Il Monte, Le Aie, Mazzini, Molino, Pecorini, Pianelli, Pradarolo, Scarampi, Serravalle, Vianino, Viazzano, Volta

Government
  - Mayor: Adriano Eustachio Coretti (prefectural commissioner)

Area
  - Total: 64.4 km^{2} (24.9 sq mi)
- Elevation: 190 m (620 ft)

Population (31 May 2007)
  - Total: 2,598
  - Density: 40.3/km^{2} (104/sq mi)
- Demonym: Varanesi
- Time zone: UTC+1 (CET)
  - Summer (DST): UTC+2 (CEST)
- Postal code: 43040
- Dialing code: 0525
- Website: https://www.comune.varano-demelegari.pr.it/

Varano de' Melegari (Parmigiano: Varàn di Melgär) is a comune (municipality) in the Province of Parma in the Italian region Emilia-Romagna, located about 110 kilometres (68 mi) west of Bologna and about 30 kilometres (19 mi) southwest of Parma.

The town is home to a medieval castle (Castello Pallavicino), a motorsport circuit, the Autodromo Riccardo Paletti, and the headquarters of racecar manufacturer Dallara. Also notable is the 7th century octagonal baptistery in the frazione of Serravalle Ceno, located on the Ceno River.

Near the town is located the Mount Prinzera, 724 meters high, it is a regional natural park along the Via Francigena, mainly formed by rocks of ophiolite origin.
