= Varsi =

- Comune
- Comune di Varsi
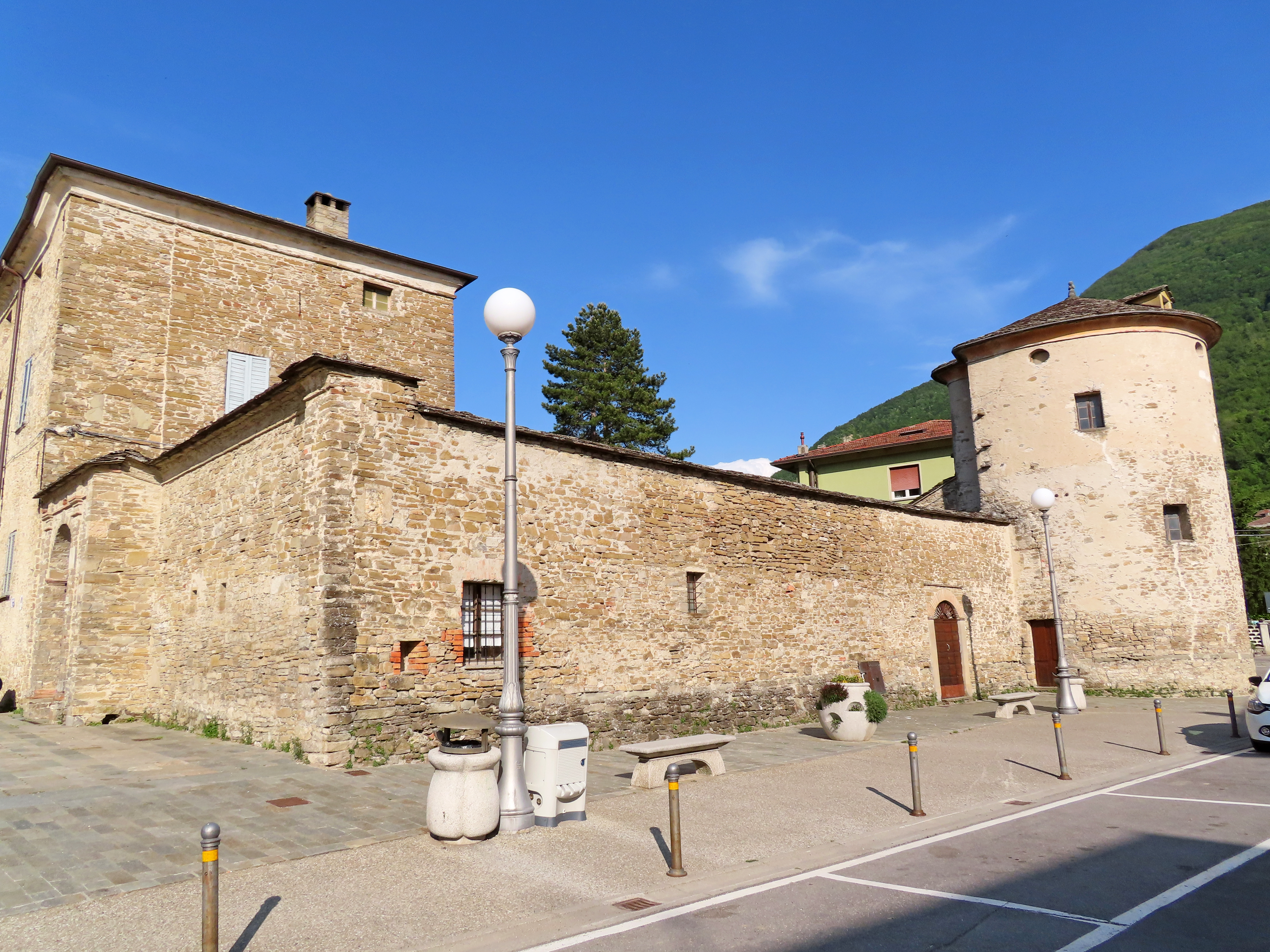
- Castle(main square)

- Coat of arms

- Location within Italy Location within Emilia-Romagna
- Coordinates: 44°40′N 9°51′E
- Country: Italy
- Region: Emilia-Romagna
- Province: Parma (PR)
- Frazioni: Baghetti, Bianchi, Contile, Corticella, Ferré, Franchini,Golotta,Lagadello, Leonardi, Lubbia Sopra, Lubbia Sotto, Manini, Michelotti, Minassi,Mosca,Peracchi, Peretti, Perotti, Pessola, Pietracavata,Pietrarada, Rocca Nuova,Rocca Vecchia ,Pisterlana,Scaffardi, Scortichiere, Sgui, Tognoni, Tosca, Villora, Volpi

Government
  - Mayor: Giovanni Ilariuzzi (Nuovi obbiettivi per Varsi)

Area
  - Total: 79.6 km^{2} (30.7 sq mi)
- Elevation: 426 m (1,398 ft)

Population (31 May 2007)
  - Total: 1,352
  - Density: 17.0/km^{2} (44.0/sq mi)
- Demonym: Varsigiani
- Time zone: UTC+1 (CET)
  - Summer (DST): UTC+2 (CEST)
- Postal code: 43049
- Dialing code: 0525
- Patron saint: San Pietro and Santa Giustina
- Saint day: 27 June
- Website: Official website

Varsi (Parmigiano: Värz) is a comune (municipality) in the Province of Parma in the Italian region Emilia-Romagna, located about 120 kilometres (75 mi) west of Bologna and about 40 kilometres (25 mi) southwest of Parma.

Notable people

Notable people

- Alfredo Credali (1889–1916), Italian Army captain and recipient of the Silver Medal of Military Valor. Born in Varsi on 25 March 1889, he died on 22 July 1916 on Mount Mosciagh, on the Asiago Plateau, from wounds sustained in combat during the First World War. A secondary school in Varsi is named after him.

Historical figures associated with Varsi

- Obietto Fieschi (died after 1445), member of the Fieschi family, who conquered the castle of Varsi in 1445.
- Donella Fieschi, sister of Obietto Fieschi, to whom the manor of Varsi was assigned as a dowry. She married Spinetta Malaspina, Marquis of Fosdinovo.
- Spinetta Malaspina (died 1473), Marquis of Fosdinovo and member of the Malaspina family, who became connected to Varsi through his marriage to Donella Fieschi.
- Giovanni Scotti, Count of Fombio, who received the fief of Varsi in 1303 from Ugo Pelosi, Bishop of Piacenza.
- Tristano Scotti, member of the Scotti family and lord of Varsi in the 15th century.
- Alessio Scotti, Count of Fombio, who subsequently acquired the castle and its appurtenances.
- Galeazzo Maria Sforza (1444–1476), Duke of Milan, who in 1469 assigned the fief of Varsi to the Scotti family
