= Province of Parma =

Province of Italy

Province of Parma Provincia di Parma (Italian)
- Province
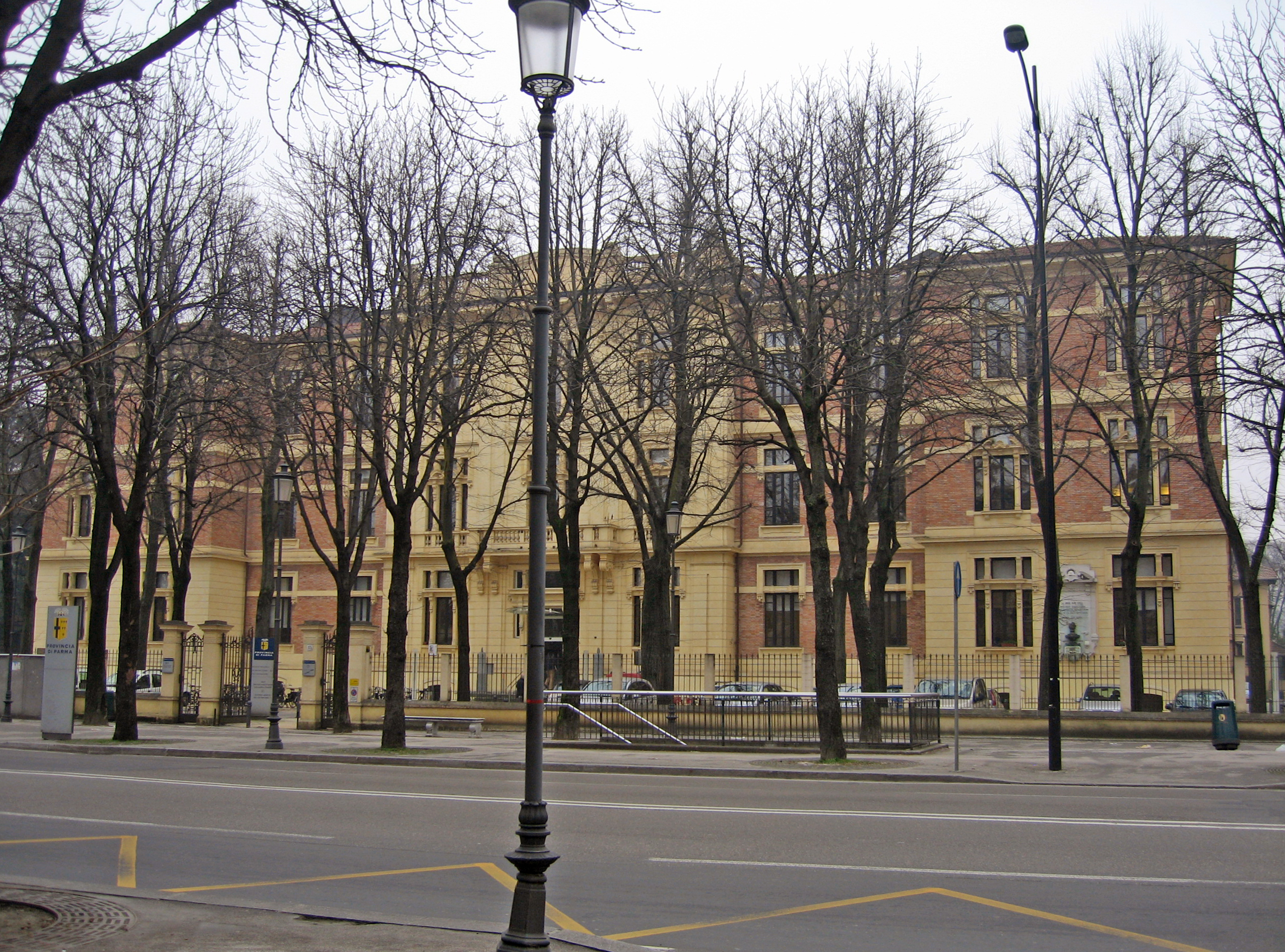
- Palazzo Giordani, the provincial seat

- Flag Coat of arms

- Location of the province of Parma in Italy
- Coordinates: 44°47′42.2″N 10°19′52.3″E
- Country: Italy
- Region: Emilia-Romagna
- Capital(s): Parma
- Municipalities: 44

Government
  - President: Alessandro Fadda (PD)

Area
  - Total: 3,447.48 km^{2} (1,331.08 sq mi)

Population (2026)
  - Total: 457,509
  - Density: 132.708/km^{2} (343.713/sq mi)
- Demonym(s): Parmense; Parmesan

GDP
  - Total: €15.672 billion (2015)
  - Per capita: €35,093 (2015)
- Time zone: UTC+01:00 (CET)
  - Summer (DST): UTC+02:00 (CEST)
- Postal code: 43010-43015; 43017-43019; 43021-43022; 43024-43025; 43028-43030; 43032; 43035-43045; 43047; 43049-43053; 43055; 43058-43059; 43100
- Telephone prefixes: 0521, 0524, 0525
- ISO 3166 code: IT-PR
- Vehicle registration: PR
- ISTAT: 034

The province of Parma (Italian: provincia di Parma) is a province in the region of Emilia-Romagna in Italy. Its largest town and capital is the city of Parma. It has a population of 457,509 in an area of 3,447.48 square kilometres (1,331.08 sq mi) across its 44 municipalities.

The province is bordered by the province of Reggio Emilia to the east, the Piacenza to the west, Lombardy's provinces of Cremona and Mantua to the north and by Liguria's provinces of La Spezia and Genoa and Tuscany's Province of Massa-Carrara to the south.

== History ==
In 1861, Italian provinces were established on the French republican model.

Italian Fascism saw the end of elections in the province of Parma in the 1920s until the end of the Second World War.

== Geography ==
The province is divided into three zones from north to south: the pianura (plains), the collina (hills) and the montagna (mountains). The Po river acts as a boundary with the nearby province of Cremona in the plains. The main centres of the collina and montagna are situated along the course of the main rivers, which descend from the Parmesan Apennine Mountains. Roughly, each zone comprises one third of the total area.

=== The plains ===
The part in the North of the Province comprises Parma, Fidenza and various smaller towns, and covers from the Po river to the foothills at an altitude of 50 to 100 m amsl. This area has a continental climate, with cold winters (minimum temperatures around −1 °C in the city centres, −3 °C to −4° in the countryside on average), hot and humid summers (maximum temperatures over 30 °C on average). During autumns and springs it is not uncommon to encounter fog, with an average of 31 days of fog a year in the city of Parma and higher values on the countryside, particularly in the area close to the Po river. During summer, thunderstorms with heavy rain and hail can hit the area. This is the part of the Province that hosts the vast majority of the industrial production, while the rest of the land is extensively used to grow crops, mainly wheat, tomatoes (with Mutti and various other producers based here) and alfalfa to feed the cows whose milk is used to produce Parmesan cheese.

=== The hills ===
The centre part of the Province comprises only smaller towns, built in the valleys along rivers or on top of hills for defensive purposes, from the foothills to where the Apennine begin to grow into fully developed mountains, between 100 and around 700 m amsl. Many of those towns are built around medieval castles, such as Bardi, Torrechiara, Compiano and many others. In this area the climate is slightly different from that of the plains, with less foggy days, milder temperatures (higher minimum temperatures during winter and lower maximum temperatures during summer due to its height that makes it less prone to Temperature inversions. Here, cultivated fields and wide woods coexist, mainly because part of the land is owned by families no longer living in the area, as big chunks of the population migrated to the plains or to other nations, mainly the United States, the United Kingdom and Argentina, over the course of the 20th century.

=== The mountains ===
The southernmost area of the Province is occupied by the ridge of the Apennine, with mountains ranging from 1000 m to the 1850 m amsl of Mount Sillara, Mount Losanna and Mount Marmagna. Due to the geographical nature of this mountain range, the Parmesan side, facing North, has considerably longer nights than the rest of Pianura padana and the Italian Alps, even during summer. In this area the climate is Alpine, with long winters, temperatures frequently reaching double digits negatives and snow falling from October to May, typically leaving the tops snow-free only from mid June to the end of September. During the summer months temperatures reach the lower 20s°C only when intense heat waves hit the region, while minimum temperatures are in the 5–8 °C range, depending on the altitude. Almost daily thunderstorms develop on these mountains during summer, rarely being snow thunderstorms. The mountains are almost completely covered in forests to a height of about 1500 m amsl, where grass, heather and various berries predominate. Two main towns are located in the valleys between the Apennine mountains: Bedonia and Borgotaro, historically in control of commercial traffic through the passes to Liguria (Passo del Tomarlo, Passo della Cisa, Passo del Brattello, Passo del Bocco and others).

=== Municipalities ===
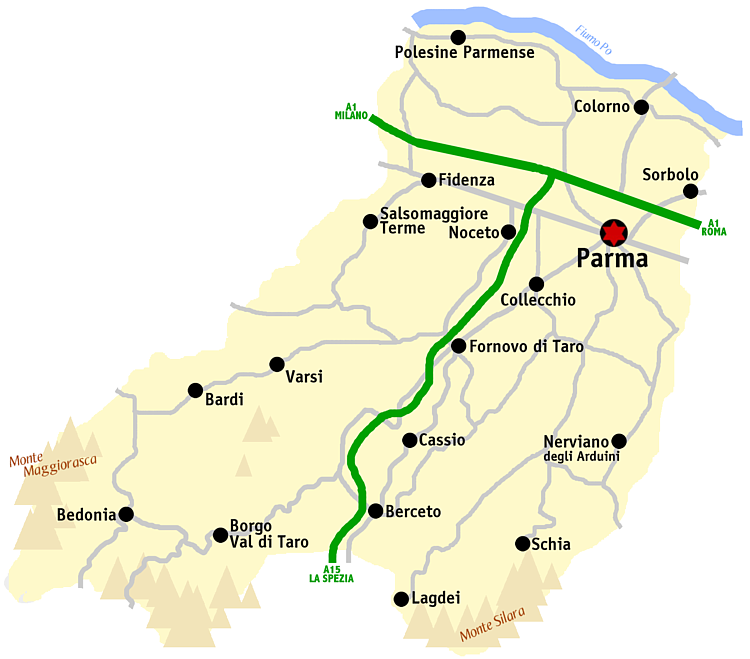
Map of the province

The province has 44 municipalities:

- Albareto
- Bardi
- Bedonia
- Berceto
- Bore
- Borgo Val di Taro
- Busseto
- Calestano
- Collecchio
- Colorno
- Compiano
- Corniglio
- Felino
- Fidenza
- Fontanellato
- Fontevivo
- Fornovo di Taro
- Langhirano
- Lesignano de' Bagni
- Medesano
- Monchio delle Corti
- Montechiarugolo
- Neviano degli Arduini
- Noceto
- Palanzano
- Parma
- Pellegrino Parmense
- Polesine Zibello
- Roccabianca
- Sala Baganza
- Salsomaggiore Terme
- San Secondo Parmense
- Sissa Trecasali
- Solignano
- Soragna
- Sorbolo Mezzani
- Terenzo
- Tizzano Val Parma
- Tornolo
- Torrile
- Traversetolo
- Valmozzola
- Varano de' Melegari
- Varsi

== Demographics ==
As of 2026, the population is 457,509, of which 49.5% are male, and 50.5% are female. Minors make up 15.0% of the population, and seniors make up 23.8%.

Historical population

Year	Pop.	±%
1861	271,050	—
1871	282,373	+4.2%
1881	287,347	+1.8%
1901	312,623	+8.8%
1911	342,455	+9.5%
1921	376,239	+9.9%
1931	383,683	+2.0%
1936	381,771	−0.5%

Year	Pop.	±%
1951	391,299	+2.5%
1961	389,199	−0.5%
1971	395,497	+1.6%
1981	400,192	+1.2%
1991	391,330	−2.2%
2001	392,976	+0.4%
2011	427,434	+8.8%
2021	448,916	+5.0%

Source: ISTAT

=== Immigration ===
As of 2025, immigrants make up 18.2% of the total population. The 5 largest foreign countries of birth are Moldova, Albania, Morocco, India, and Romania.

=== Quality of life ===
According to the CGIA of Mestre, in 2021 the province of Parma had the highest annual gross salaries for the private sector employees, after Milan.

== Cuisine ==
The cuisine of Parma is part of Emilian cuisine.

Parma is famous for its prosciutto di Parma. The whole area is renowned for its salami production (particularly the well known salame Felino), as well as for the Parmesan cheese and some kinds of pasta like gnocchi di patate, cappelletti (or anolini) in brodo (a kind of round tortelli stuffed with a filling made of stewed donkey, Parmesan cheese and bread crumbs, cooked and served in hot broth), tortelli with different stuffing (erbetta, potatoes, pumpkin, mushrooms, chestnuts, tortél dóls di Colorno) and chicche.

== Transport ==
=== Highways ===
There are two main highways that go through Parma: A1, to Milan to the west and to Bologna to the east, and A15, to La Spezia and the sea to the south.

=== Airport ===
The Province of Parma is served by the Giuseppe Verdi Airport.

=== Railways ===
The province is crossed by the Milan-Bologna railroad, one of the most important in Italy, with a station in Parma. The latter is the starting point for the following lines, connecting the city to the Tyrrhenian Sea, Alps and the Po River delta:

- Pontremolese line, with a branch to Fidenza and Fornovo di Taro
- Parma-Piadena-Brescia
- Parma-Suzzara (held by Ferrovie Emilia Romagna Srl.

The station of Fidenza is an exchange point for the lines:

- Fidenza-Salsomaggiore Terme
- Fidenza-Cremona

== Sport ==
Parma FC was founded in 1913. It is a Serie A football club renowned in Italy and Europe for its successes including three national cups, a European Cup Winner's Cup, two UEFA Cups, a European Supercup and an Italian Supercup. It plays in the city's stade Ennio Tardini which used to host up to 29,000 spectators but is being renovated in 2008 after the club was demoted to Serie B. In spring 2009 the team was promoted again in the top league (Serie A). Crociati Noceto play in Lega Pro Seconda Divisione, the fourth tier.

Parma is also home to two rugby union teams in the top national division, Overmach Rugby Parma and SKG Gran Rugby.

Parma Panthers is the Parma American football team for which John Grisham's book Playing for Pizza was based.

Also volleyball, women's basketball and baseball have large popularity in the city and have scored relevant successes.

== See also ==
- Lake Scuro Parmense
- Lake Verde (Parma)
