= Solignano =

- Comune
- Comune di Solignano
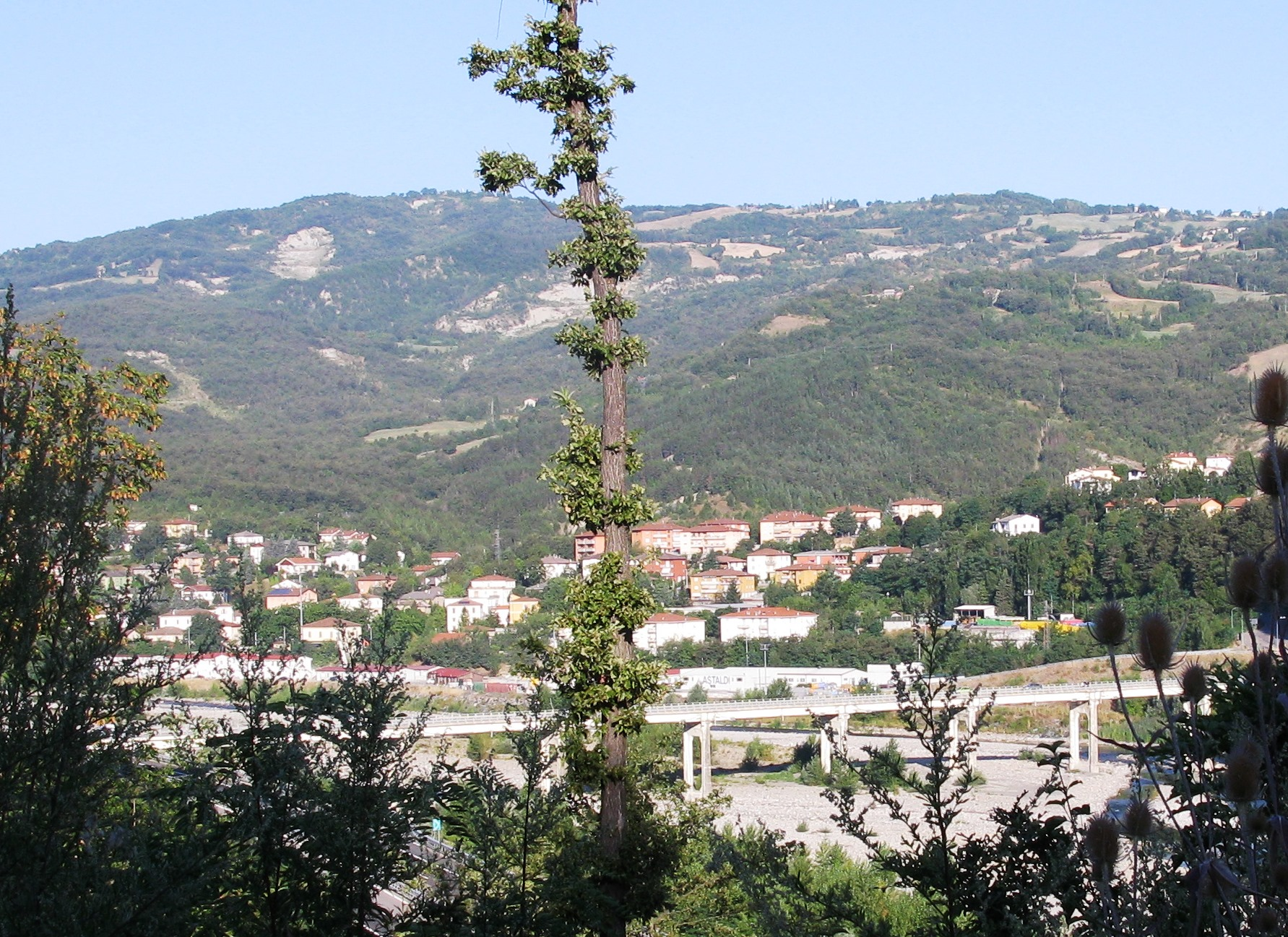

- Coat of arms

- Location within Italy Location within Emilia-Romagna
- Coordinates: 44°37′N 9°59′E
- Country: Italy
- Region: Emilia-Romagna
- Province: Parma (PR)
- Frazioni: Boio, Bottione, Filippi, Fosio, Gabelli, Marena, Masari, Masereto, Oriano, Prelerna, Rubbiano, Specchio, Spiaggio

Government
  - Mayor: Gaetano Carpena

Area
  - Total: 73.6 km^{2} (28.4 sq mi)

Population (31 May 2007)
  - Total: 1,866
  - Density: 25.4/km^{2} (65.7/sq mi)
- Time zone: UTC+1 (CET)
  - Summer (DST): UTC+2 (CEST)
- Postal code: 43040
- Dialing code: 0525
- Website: Official website

Solignano (Parmigiano: Solgnàn) is a comune (municipality) in the Province of Parma in the Italian region Emilia-Romagna, located about 110 kilometres (68 mi) west of Bologna and about 35 kilometres (22 mi) southwest of Parma.

== Twin towns ==
- Grambois, France
