= Parmigiano dialect =

Emilian dialect of Parma, Italy

Parmigiano
- Parmesan
- dialètt pramzàn
- Native to: Italy
- Language family: Indo-European: Italic; Latino-Faliscan; Romance; Italo-Western; Western Romance; Gallo-Romance; Gallo-Italic; Emilian–Romagnol; Emilian; Parmigiano

Language codes
- ISO 639-3: –
- Glottolog: None
- Linguasphere: 51-AAA-okd
- IETF: egl-u-sd-itpr

The Parmigiano dialect, sometimes anglicized as the Parmesan dialect, (al djalètt pramzàn) is a variety of the Emilian language spoken in the Province of Parma, the western-central portion of the Emilia-Romagna administrative region.

== Terminology ==
The term dialetto, usually translated as dialect in English, is commonly used in reference to all local Romance languages native to Italy, many of which are not mutually intelligible with Standard Italian and all of which have developed from Vulgar Latin independently. Parmigiano is no exception and is a variety of Emilian, not of Italian.

== Classification ==
Parmigiano is a dialect of Emilian, which is identified as "seriously endangered" by UNESCO.

Emilian is part of the Gallo-Italic family, which also includes Romagnol, Piedmontese, Ligurian, and Lombard. Among these, Ligurian in particular has influenced Parmigiano.

== History ==
Parmigiano has much of the history as Emilian, but at some point, it diverged from other versions of that linguistic group. It now lies somewhere between Western Emilian, which includes Piacentino, and Central Emilian, which includes Reggiano and Modenese. Like the other Emilian dialects, it has fewer speakers than ever because of political, social and economic factors, but La Repubblica has suggested that it is changing. It is still declining but more slowly, as parents are keen to preserve their ancestral roots.

Its origins are with Gauls, who occupied the Parma area in around 400 BC, who had stayed there after the invasion of the Romans. The lexicon was therefore a type of Latin influenced by Gaulish. The Gauls, or Celts, left their mark on modern Parmigiano in some words today, such as gozèn "pig", scrana "chair" and sôga "rope". As a result of Spanish and especially French invasions, Parmigiani began to use words which came from a French language that had Latin roots. That is seen in tirabusòn "corkscrew" (similar to Modern French's tire-bouchon) vert "open" (French: ouvert), pòmm da téra "potato" (French: pomme de terre) and many other words.

== Geographic distribution ==
Parmigiano is mainly spoken in the province of Parma. The vocabulary and vowels vary across the region, particularly between the urban and rural dialects, as there was once little mobility from within to outside the city walls. The dialect spoken outside Parma is often called Arioso or Parmense within the city itself, but variation is less pronounced than it once was. The dialect spoken in Casalmaggiore in the Province of Cremona to the north of Parma is closely related to Parmigiano. Parmigiano subdialects have three forms:

- Low Parmigiano, which is native to a northern part of the province that lies between the Po and the Via Aemilia and whose largest town is Colorno.
- Western Parmigiano, which is heard around Fidenza and Salsomaggiore Terme and has been strongly influenced by Piacentino, another Emilian language.
- High Parmigiano, which has been affected by Ligurian and is spoken in the Apennine region to the south.

An example of the variation is the word bombèn "very well". In 1861, the popular forms were moltbein and monbén, but it has also taken these forms: montben, mondbén, moltbén, moltbein, monbén, and mombén. In the "Western Parmigiano" it's used a variety of locutions with the same meaning of bombèn, such as bèn a bota or bèn da bòn.

=== Official status ===
Like other varieties of Emilian, Parmigiano is not recognised as a minority dialect in the European Union or in Italy. Since 27 June 2000, Italy has been a signatory of the Council of Europe's European Charter for Regional or Minority Languages, which aims to protect and promote historical regional and minority languages in Europe, but it has not ratified it.

== Phonology ==
=== Consonants ===
		Labial	Coronal	Postalveolar /Palatal	Dorsal
Nasal		m	n̪	ɲ	ŋ
Occlusive	unv.	p	t̪	t͡ʃ	k
Occlusive	v.	b	d̪	d͡ʒ	g
Fricative	unv.	f	s̠	(ʃ)	
Fricative	v.	v	z̠		
Approximant		w	l	j	
Rhotic			r		(ʁ)

- The phonemic status of /ŋ/ is debated. While most sources claim that /ŋ/ contrasts with /n/ in coda position, this assertion is challenged by Michelini, who instead asserts that [ŋ] is merely a word-final allophone of /n/ following vowels with simple intonation. A peculiarity of Parmigiano, which it does however share with some other Emilian dialects, is the cluster /ŋn/.
- /s, z/ are retracted alveolar [s̠, z̠], while /n, t, d/ are dental [n̪, t̪, d̪].
- /ʃ/ is only present in recent loanwords from Italian, and is variously substituted by /s̠/.
- [ʁ] is a common realization of /r/. Its presence varies by speaker.

=== Vowels ===
	Front	Central	Back
Close	i		u
Close-mid	e		o
Open-mid	ɛ		ɔ
Open		a	

There is considerable debate regarding the phonemic nature of vowels in Parmigiano. Traditionally, it is analysed as having a length contrast between vowels, with each vowel having a short and a long variant. Other studies suggest that vowel length is allophonic and determined by the length of the next consonant. Most recently, it has been shown that a better description of the contrast mentioned above is one of pitch accent (or intonation, as Michelini terms it). What was considered to originally have been a short stressed vowel shows "simple intonation" (flat tone), and originally long stressed vowels show "rising intonation" (rising tone). Vowels followed by /l, m, n, r/ which are in turn followed by a consonant are considered to have simple intonation, but rising intonation applies to the whole unit: the sonorants are treated as if they were the falling element of a diphthong. Finally, there exists a falling intonation, which is phonemic on very few words: bènla ("skunk"), tènra ("tender", f.sg.), sèndra ("ash"). Otherwise, falling intonation can substitute rising intonation in sentence final imperative verbs.

== Writing system ==
Parmigiano is written using the Latin alphabet, but spelling can vary within a dialect. It has never been standardised, and the language is rarely written.

Still, a number of Parmigiano-Italian dictionaries have been published. Angelo Mazza and translator Clemente Bondi were prolific writers of poetry in Parmigiano. Most of the works were first published in the late 1700s or the early to mid-1800s.

Currently, one of the most widely adopted orthographies is that devised by Guglielmo Capacchi, author of perhaps the most complete Italian-Parmigiano dictionary to date. A more recent orthography was created in 2017 by Guido Michelini, with the aim to convey the exact pronunciation to readers that may be unfamiliar with spoken Parmigiano.

=== Comparison between orthographies ===
==== Vowels ====
IPA	Capacchi orthography			Michelini orthography			
IPA	unstressed	stressed		unstressed	simple intonation	rising intonation	falling intonation
IPA	unstressed	short	long	unstressed	simple intonation	rising intonation	falling intonation
/a/	a	à		a	à	aà	àa
/ɛ/	e	è	ä	e	è	eè	èe
/e/	e	é		e	é	eé	ée
/i/	i	ì		i	ì	iì	ìi
/ɔ/	o	ò		o	ò	oò	òo
/o/	o	ó		o	ó	oó	óo
/u/	u	ù		u	ù	uù	ùu

==== Consonants ====
IPA	Conditions	Capacchi orthography		Michelini orthography
IPA	Conditions	usually	after short stressed vowel	Michelini orthography
/m/		m	mm	m
/n/	Not word-finally	n	nn	n
/n/	Word-finally	nʼ	nnʼ	n
/ŋ/		n		n
/ŋn/		-	nʼn	ⁿn
/ɲ/		gn	ggn	gn
/p/		p	pp	p
/t/		t	tt	t
/k/	Before consonant or back vowel	c	cc	c
/k/	Word-finally	ch	cch	c
/k/	Before front vowel	ch	cch	ch
/tʃ/	Before back vowel	ci	cci	ci
/tʃ/	Word-finally or before consonant	cʼ	ccʼ	ć
/tʃ/	Before front vowel	c	cc	c
/b/		b	bb	b
/d/		d	dd	d
/g/	Before consonant or back vowel	g	gg	g
/g/	Word-finally	gh	ggh	g
/g/	Before front vowel	gh	ggh	gh
/dʒ/	Before back vowel	gi	ggi	gi
/dʒ/	Word-finally or before consonant	gʼ	ggʼ	ǵ
/dʒ/	Before front vowel	g	gg	g
/f/		f	ff	f
/s̠/		s	ss	s
/s̠t͡ʃ/	Before back vowel	sʼci	ssʼci	sći
/s̠t͡ʃ/	Word-finally or before consonant	sʼcʼ	ssʼcʼ	sć
/s̠t͡ʃ/	Before front vowel	sʼc	ssʼc	sć
/ʃ/	Only in loanwords	sc	ssc	sc
/v/		v	vv	v
/z̠/		z	zz	z
/l/		l	ll	l
/r/		r	rr	r
/ʁ/		r	rr	r
/j/		j	jj	j
/w/		u	-	u

== Grammar ==
Parmigiano is a synthetic language like Italian and French (but much less so than Classical Latin) and shares several notable features with most other Romance languages:

- loss of Latin's declension and the neuter grammatical gender for nouns
- development of grammatical articles from Latin demonstratives
- new tenses formed from auxiliaries

Nouns and most pronouns are inflected for number (singular or plural); adjectives, for number and gender (masculine or feminine), agreeing with their respective nouns; personal pronouns, for person, number, gender, and case; and verbs, for mood, tense, and the person and number of their subjects. Case is primarily marked using word order and prepositions, and certain verb features are marked using auxiliary verbs.

=== Verbs ===
Verbs in Parmigiano are usually divided into four conjugations based on their ending in the infinitive form: -är, -ér, -or, -ìr.

There are three persons (1st, 2nd, 3rd) and two numbers (singular, plural) in finite moods. The finite moods are indicative, subjunctive, conditional and imperative. The indicative further has 3 simple tenses (present, imperfect, future) and 3 compound tenses (perfect, plurperfect, future perfect). The subjunctive has 2 simple tenses (present, imperfect) and 2 compound tenses (past, plurperfect). The conditional has one simple tense (present) and one compound tense (past).

Non-finite moods are the present infinitive, the past infinitive (compound tense), the present gerund, the past gerund and the past participle. The present participle is not used, and the gerund is very rare, most of its original functions being expressed periphrastically.

==== Conjugation of regular verbs in -är ====
Indicative: -är; gerund: -ànd; past participle: -è (m.sg., m.pl.), -äda (f.sg.), -ädi (f.pl.)

Number	Person		Indicative						Subjunctive				Conditional		Imperative
Number	Person		Present		Imperfect		Future		Present		Imperfect		Present		Present
Singular	1st		mi a	-	mi a	-äva	mi a	-arò	mi a	-a	mi a	-ìss	mi a	-arè/-arìss	
Singular	2nd		ti t	-	ti t	-äv	ti t	-arè	ti t	-	ti t	-ìss	ti t	-arìss	-a
Singular	3rd	m	lu al	-a	lu al	-äva	lu al	-arà	lu al	-a	lu al	-ìss	lu al	-arè/arìss	
Singular	3rd	f	lè la	-a	lè la	-äva	lè la	-arà	lè la	-a	lè la	-ìss	lè la	-arè/arìss	
Plural	1st		nuätor a	-èmma	nuätor a	-ävon	nuätor a	-arèmma	nuätor a	-èmma	nuätor a	-ìsson	nuätor a	-arìsson	-èmma
Plural	2nd		vuätor a	-ì	vuätor a	-ävov	vuätor a	-arì	vuätor a	-ì	vuätor a	-ìssov	vuätor a	-arìssov	-ì
Plural	3rd		lór i	-on	lór i	-ävon	lór i	-aràn	lór i	-on	lór i	-ìsson	lór i	-arìsson	

==== Conjugation of regular verbs in -ér ====
Indicative: -ér; gerund: -énd; past participle: -ù (m.sg., m.pl.), -uda (f.sg.), -udi (f.pl.)

Number	Person		Indicative						Subjunctive				Conditional		Imperative
Number	Person		Present		Imperfect		Future		Present		Imperfect		Present		Present
Singular	1st		mi a	-	mi a	-äva	mi a	-rò	mi a	-a	mi a	-ìss	mi a	-rè/-rìss	
Singular	2nd		ti t	-	ti t	-äv	ti t	-rè	ti t	-	ti t	-ìss	ti t	-rìss	-
Singular	3rd	m	lu al	-	lu al	-äva	lu al	-rà	lu al	-a	lu al	-ìss	lu al	-rè/-rìss	
Singular	3rd	f	lè la	-	lè la	-äva	lè la	-rà	lè la	-a	lè la	-ìss	lè la	-rè/-rìss	
Plural	1st		nuätor a	-èmma	nuätor a	-ävon	nuätor a	-rèmma	nuätor a	-èmma	nuätor a	-ìsson	nuätor a	-rìsson	-èmma
Plural	2nd		vuätor a	-ì	vuätor a	-ävov	vuätor a	-rì	vuätor a	-ì	vuätor a	-ìssov	vuätor a	-rìssov	-ì
Plural	3rd		lór i	-on	lór i	-ävon	lór i	-ràn	lór i	-on	lór i	-ìsson	lór i	-rìsson	

==== Conjugation of regular verbs in -or ====
Indicative: -or (stressed on the root); gerund: -énd; past participle: -ù (m.sg., m.pl.), -uda (f.sg.), -udi (f.pl.)

Number	Person		Indicative						Subjunctive				Conditional		Imperative
Number	Person		Present		Imperfect		Future		Present		Imperfect		Present		Present
Singular	1st		mi a	-	mi a	-äva	mi a	-rò	mi a	-a	mi a	-ìss	mi a	-rè/-rìss	
Singular	2nd		ti t	-	ti t	-äv	ti t	-rè	ti t	-	ti t	-ìss	ti t	-rìss	-
Singular	3rd	m	lu al	-a	lu al	-äva	lu al	-rà	lu al	-a	lu al	-ìss	lu al	-rè/-rìss	
Singular	3rd	f	lè la	-a	lè la	-äva	lè la	-rà	lè la	-a	lè la	-ìss	lè la	-rè/-rìss	
Plural	1st		nuätor a	-èmma	nuätor a	-ävon	nuätor a	-rèmma	nuätor a	-èmma	nuätor a	-ìsson	nuätor a	-rìsson	-èmma
Plural	2nd		vuätor a	-ì	vuätor a	-ävov	vuätor a	-rì	vuätor a	-ì	vuätor a	-ìssov	vuätor a	-rìssov	-ì
Plural	3rd		lór i	-on	lór i	-ävon	lór i	-ràn	lór i	-on	lór i	-ìsson	lór i	-rìsson	

==== Conjugation of regular verbs in -ìr ====
Indicative: -ìr; gerund: -énd; past participle: -ì (m.sg., m.pl.), -ida (f.sg.), -idi (f.pl.)

Number	Person		Indicative						Subjunctive				Conditional		Imperative
Number	Person		Present		Imperfect		Future		Present		Imperfect		Present		Present
Singular	1st		mi a	-ìss	mi a	-ìva	mi a	-irò	mi a	-ìssa	mi a	-ìss	mi a	-irè/-irìss	
Singular	2nd		ti t	-ìss	ti t	-ìv	ti t	-irè	ti t	-ìss	ti t	-ìss	ti t	-irìss	-ìssa
Singular	3rd	m	lu al	-ìssa	lu al	-ìva	lu al	-irà	lu al	-ìssa	lu al	-ìss	lu al	-irè/-irìss	
Singular	3rd	f	lè la	-ìssa	lè la	-ìva	lè la	-irà	lè la	-ìssa	lè la	-ìss	lè la	-irè/-irìss	
Plural	1st		nuätor a	-ìmma	nuätor a	-ìvon	nuätor a	-irèmma	nuätor a	-ìmma	nuätor a	-ìsson	nuätor a	-irìsson	-èmma
Plural	2nd		vuätor a	-ì	vuätor a	-ìvov	vuätor a	-irì	vuätor a	-ì	vuätor a	-ìssov	vuätor a	-irìssov	-ì
Plural	3rd		lór i	-ìsson	lór i	-ìvon	lór i	-iràn	lór i	-ìsson	lór i	-ìsson	lór i	-irìsson	

==== Negation ====
Parmigiano expresses negation in two parts, with the particle n attached to the verb (often adding the pleonastic particle "gh") and one or more negative words (connegatives) that modify the verb or one of its arguments. Negation encircles a conjugated verb with n after the subject and the negative adverb after the conjugated verb, For example, the simple verbal negation is expressed by n before the finite verb (and any object pronouns) and the adverb miga after the finite verb. That is a feature it has in common with French, which uses ne and pas. Pas derives from the Latin passus "step", and miga "breadcrumb" also signifies a small quantity (Ex. "A n gh'ò miga visst Zvan incó", meaning "I have not seen John today").

== Samples ==
Below is a sample of Parmigiano, compared to Italian and English. Even within the province, there is considerable variation in vocabulary and phonetics, therefore this sample is not representative of all varieties.

Language	Sample
English	The crow stole from the window a piece of cheese; perched on a treetop, he was ready to eat it when a fox saw him; he was absolutely starving.
Italian	Il corvo aveva rubato da una finestra un pezzo di formaggio; appollaiato sulla cima di un albero, era pronto a mangiarselo, quando la volpe lo vide; era davvero affamata.
Parmigiano	Al cornación l'äva robè da 'na fnéstra 'n tòch äd formàj; pozè insimma a 'na pianta, l'éra lì lì par magnärsol, quand la volpa la l'à visst; la gh'äva fama dabón.
IPA	[ɐl koʁnɐˈt͡ʃõ˧ⁿ ˌlɛ˧˥vɐ ʁoˈbɛ˧ d̪ɐ nɐ ˈfneː˧˥s̠t̪ʁɐ n̪ ˌt̪ɔ˧˥k ɛd̪̥ foʁˈmaː˧˥j | poˈz̠ɛ ĩn̠ˌs̠i˧mɐ nɐ ˈpjã˧n̪˥t̪ɐ | ˈleː˧˥ʁɐ ˌli˩ ˈli˧ pɐʁ mɐˈɲɛ˧ʁ˥s̠ɔl | ˌkwã˧n̪d̪ lɐ ˈvo˧l˥pɐ lɐ ˌla˧ ˈvi˧s̠t̪ | lɐ ˌgɛ˧˥vɐ ˈfaː˧˥mɐ d̪ɐˈbõⁿ]

== Words ==
English	Parmigiano
And	E
Emilia	Emilja
Romagna	Romagna
Italy	Italja

== Bibliography ==
- Gilmour, David (2011). The Pursuit of Italy: A History of a Land, Its Regions and Their Peoples. Allen Lane. ISBN 978-1-84614-251-2.
- Maiden, Martin; Parry, M. Mair (1997). The dialects of Italy. Routledge. ISBN 978-0-415-11104-1.
- Parker, Philip M. (2008). Webster's Parmigiano - English Thesaurus Dictionary. ICON Group International. ISBN 978-0-497-83663-4.
