= Tizzano Val Parma =

Tizzano Val Parma Comune

- Piazza Roma

Location
- Country: Italy
- Region: Emilia-Romagna
- Province: Parma

Administration
- Mayor: Isabella Rossi (civic list Futuro in Comune), since 10 June 2024

Territory
- Coordinates: 44°31′14.4″N 10°11′55″E
- Elevation: 814 m above sea level
- Area: 78.39 km^{2}
- Population: 2,244 (31 May 2026)
- Density: 28.63 inhabitants/km^{2}
- Frazioni: Albazzano, Antognola, Anzolla, Boschetto, Capoponte, Capriglio, Carobbio, Carpaneto, Casagalvana, Casale di Vezzano, Casola, Costa, Fontanafredda, Groppizioso, Groppo, Isola, Lagrimone, Madurera, Moragnano, Musiara Inferiore, Musiara Superiore, Pianestolla, Pietta, Pratolungo, Reno, Rusino, Schia, Treviglio
- Neighbouring comuni: Corniglio, Langhirano, Neviano degli Arduini, Palanzano

Other information
- Postal code: 43028
- Dialing code: 0521
- Time zone: UTC+1
- ISTAT code: 034039
- Cadastral code: L183
- Licence plate: PR
- Seismic zone: Zone 3 (low seismicity)
- Climate zone: Zone F, 3,499 degree days
- Demonym: Tizzanesi

Maps
- Tizzano Val Parma (Italy)

- Location of the comune of Tizzano Val Parma in the province of Parma
- Official website

Tizzano Val Parma (Parmigiano: Tisàn) is a comune (municipality) in the Province of Parma in the Italian region Emilia-Romagna, located about 90 kilometres (56 mi) west of Bologna and about 35 kilometres (22 mi) southwest of Parma.

== Geography ==
The municipal territory of Tizzano Val Parma lies on the right bank of the middle and upper Parma valley. It is crossed by the Parma torrent, which marks the boundary with the municipality of Langhirano, by the Parmossa torrent, a right-bank tributary of the Parma, and, in its south-eastern part, by the Bardea torrent, a left-bank tributary of the Enza. The area is mountainous and is dominated to the south by the broad massif of Monte Caio, which reaches 1,584 m above sea level at Punta Bocchialini and marks the boundary with the municipalities of Corniglio to the south-west and Palanzano to the south-east; to the east rises Monte Fuso, on the boundary with the municipality of Neviano degli Arduini.

The territory is affected by numerous landslides. In the mountain areas dense woodland prevails, alternating with rocky spurs and gentler slopes, mostly cultivated; near the main watercourses there are some fluvial terraces.

The main village lies at 814 m above sea level on the northern slope of Monte Rotondo, around a hill crowned by the ruins of the medieval castle. The old centre extends south of the castle, around an elongated square and two parallel streets lined with rows of buildings.

== Name ==
The place name Tizzano is of praedial origin: it derives from the Latin cognomen Titius (or Titus) with the suffix -anus. In Roman times landholdings took the name of their owner, so Tizzano indicated the estate of a certain Titius or Titus. The similarity between the dialect name and the Latin word statio, which indicated a staging post along Roman roads, has also been noted.

=== Legends ===
Several popular legends, with no documentary basis, have grown up around the name. According to the historian Bonaventura Angeli, the castle was built on the ruins of an ancient tower erected by a certain Titus "in the times of Julius Caesar and Pompey", as some Latin verses written in large letters in a room of the castle were said to testify; this Titus was supposedly the Roman general Titus Cornelius Balbus, who in 71 BC is said to have founded three fortified villages in the area, giving each a part of his own name: Tizzano, Corniglio and Ballone. A variant of the local tradition makes Titus a Roman soldier who, at the end of his service, received a few iugera of land along the road taken by the legions in the war against the Ligures, and built his farm there.

There is no basis either for the theory that the name is connected with the alleged discovery of a burning brand (tizzone) in the ground during the construction of the castle, a legend to which the municipal coat of arms refers.

=== Names of the hamlets ===
Many other place names in the municipality are also of Latin origin: Isola from insula ("isolated house or farm"), Carobbio from quadrubium ("crossroads of four ways"), Musiara from mus ("mouse"), Lagrimone from ager montium ("field among the mountains"), Caio from callis ("narrow, rough path"), Rusino from rus ("countryside, farm") and Selvapiana from silva plana ("level forest"), while the name of La Vertara, a locality near the main village, has been linked to the god Vertumnus, protector of the ripening of fruit (Vertumni ara, "altar of Vertumnus"). For Siola (formerly Ciola or Sciola), a locality by the ford on the Parma torrent, two etymologies have been proposed: from sellula, the sedan chair used to carry people across the ford (hence also Antesica, ante sellula, "before the ford"), or from cellula, in the sense of a cell, a monastic dependency.

== History ==
=== Prehistory and Roman period ===
The area was already inhabited in the Bronze Age, as shown by finds in the main village, at Femminatiche (near Albazzano), at Monteremo and at Ca' Bottazzo (near Moragnano). Two fragments of Etruscan pottery from the Iron Age found at Monteremo suggest that the site lay on a route towards Lupazzano across a ford on the Parmossa.

In antiquity the Parma Apennines belonged to the territory of the Ligures, who were subdued by Rome after a long series of wars (238–155 BC); in 180 and 179 BC some 47,000 Ligurians were deported to Samnium. According to local historical tradition, the area was crossed by the so-called "Hundred Miles road", recorded in the Antonine Itinerary, which ran up the Parma valley from Parma, crossed Monte Caio and descended into the Enza valley to cross the Apennines at the Lagastrello Pass. As no trace of a Roman bridge has been found, the Parma is thought to have been forded between Antesica and Siola. A statio or mansio is placed 25 Roman miles from Parma, near present-day Piantalfumo. A small settlement grew up near Albazzano between the Republican and Imperial periods; no other Roman finds have been identified, partly because no targeted research has been carried out.

=== Early Middle Ages ===
Between the 8th and 9th centuries the locality of Ciola, today's Siola near Capoponte, was organised as a curtis belonging to the monastery of San Tommaso in Reggio Emilia. An inventory describes its sowings (40 moggia of cereals), its tools, its livestock, its 36 male and female serfs and its ten dependent farms, which supplied cereals, sheep, poultry, eggs, days of corvée labour and eleven amphorae of wine.

The village of Tizzano arose in the early Middle Ages. The place name is first recorded in March 991, in a deed by which Prangarda, daughter of the margrave Adalbert Atto of Canossa and wife of the marquis Maginfred, sold the houses and property she owned at Tizzano to the deacon Rambaldo of the parish church of Borgo San Donnino (today Fidenza) for forty pounds of silver. On 22 August 1004 the Lombard Guido, son of the late Adamo, "de loco qui dicitur Antisica", gave his future bride Richilda three farms with twelve iugera of vineyards and ploughland and six of woodland at Cattabiano, Cisiliano and Tizzano. In the same decades the documents also mention Carobbio (912), Isola (Insula Vallis Parmae, 10 October 999) and Casola (Casule, 1000), while a deed of 880 naming Albazzano is considered a forgery. In 1016 the oratory of Santa Caterina at Ciola, which belonged to the Benedictines of San Giovanni Evangelista in Parma, is mentioned in the will of Everardo of Antesica, a member of a branch of the Attonid family.

The settlement lay near the parish church (pieve) of San Pietro, almost certainly built around the 10th century and rebuilt between the late 11th and early 12th centuries with a nave, two aisles and apses. The pieve is first mentioned on 11 June 1005 in the Ordo Archipresbiterorum Plebium drawn up by Bishop Sigifredo II of Parma; in a donation by the bishop of the same date, "Bonizo archipresbiter Sancti Petri de Ticiano" appears among the witnesses. Its main bell, dated 1272, is considered the oldest in the diocese. In the Rotulus decimarum of 1230 the churches of Sant'Andrea di Cerreto, San Genesio di Albazzano, San Maurizio di Carobbio and San Giorgio di Fontanafredda depended on the pieve.

=== The castle and the Terzi ===
Between the 10th and 11th centuries a castle was built south of the village to guard the Parma valley and the salt road; its existence is documented from the 11th century. According to reports of uncertain reliability, in the early 13th century the fief belonged to Giberto III da Correggio; in 1247 Emperor Frederick II granted it to the da Cornazzano, ancestors of the Terzi. In 1309 the inhabitants of the various villages drew up the Statutes of Tizzano, which were not imposed by the feudal lord.

In 1364 the brothers Niccolò Terzi the Elder and Giberto swore fealty to Bernabò Visconti for the castles of Tizzano and Belvedere (today's Rocca di Rusino). In 1386 Gian Galeazzo Visconti confirmed the fief to Niccolò and his heirs, granting Tizzano wider immunities; on 19 August 1387, by a diploma sealed at Nuremberg, Emperor Wenceslaus of Luxembourg raised Tizzano to a county. On that occasion the name of Reno, until then called Vaccarizza, appears for the first time. Niccolò died in Bergamo in January 1398, leaving his sons Ottobuono, Giacomo and Giovanni; Ottobuono, a condottiero in the service of the Visconti, built or rebuilt the castle of Belvedere between 1395 and 1405. The first record of the San Genesio fair at Albazzano, held in August and exempt from all duties except that on wine, dates from 1372.

On 27 May 1409, after Ottobuono was killed in an ambush at Valverde near Rubiera by Muzio Attendolo Sforza, the castle was occupied by the Fieschi; Parma passed to the Este, who had entered the city on 25 May. In the salt census (estimo del sale) of 1415 the fief of Tizzano was exempted from the salt tax, except for the villages of Albazzano, Anzolla, Isola and Pietta, in return for its support of the Este. Ottobuono's son, Niccolò known as "the Warrior", later recovered the title of count of Tizzano and held it until the end of Visconti rule, when, with Parma passing to Francesco Sforza, the Terzi took refuge with the Gonzaga in Mantua.

=== From the Pallavicino to the Farnese ===
Sforza granted the fief to Pietro Ghirasio (or Girasio) da Contrano, known as Fiasco. In 1478 his son Agolante sold it to the marquis Gianfrancesco I Pallavicino, taking advantage of the absence of his brother Anfitrione, who had gone to Milan to clear himself of a charge brought by the duke and later tried in vain to recover it. On 7 April 1495 Ludovico il Moro confirmed the investiture to Pallavicino. In the late 15th century the village was rebuilt further south, on the castle hill, and the oratory of the Madonna del Santo Rosario was built; on 1 August 1476 the oratory of Saints Bartholomew and George had been established in the castle.

By his will of 29 November 1497 Gianfrancesco divided his property among his sons, entailing it on the legitimate male line, and left to his eldest son Gaspare the fief of Tizzano and Ballone "with villages, holdings, mills, meadows, pastures, fishing rights, inns, duties, various tolls, rents and revenues". When Gaspare died without heirs in 1518, a long dispute began: on one side Barbara and Teodora, daughters of Rolando Pallavicino (d. 1529), with Barbara's husband Ludovico Rangoni; on the other the sons of Bernardino Pallavicino, who in 1530 claimed the castles under the entail, and Livia, daughter of Polidoro, with her husband Gregorio Casali, whose rights later passed to the Gonzaga of Novellara. The castle was occupied by troops from Parma and then by those of Pier Luigi Farnese, and the fief was sequestered; during the sequestration the podestà was replaced by a commissioner appointed by the ducal Chamber.

During the War of Parma in 1551 the castle was held by a French garrison; on 7 September the imperial troops of Ferrante I Gonzaga bombarded it and the French abandoned it during the night, while the village was sacked. Duke Ottavio Farnese lifted the sequestration on 22 April 1569 and ended the dispute by buying the shares of the fief from the individual heirs: from Michele Casali on 4 May 1571, from Count Giulio Rangoni on 12 November 1571 and from Camillo and Alfonso Gonzaga on 12 June 1572. In the military reorganisation begun by Ottavio in 1581, Tizzano became the seat of one of the ten infantry terzi of the duchy.

=== Economy and society in the early modern period ===
In 1571 the revenues of the fief amounted to 3,458 lire. The main items were the tax paid by the villages (576 lire, the highest from Ballone, the lowest from Isola), the duties on wine, meat, transit and weighing and on the San Genesio fair, the rent of seven large estates and that of the feudal mills of the Masere, Groppo and Pietta, paid in wheat; the podestà, who lived in the castle, received 120 lire a year. Subjects were obliged to use the feudal mills and to maintain the mill races without pay. In 1573 the lease of the seven estates was renewed for seven years; on 30 May 1582 they were sold together with other land.

The census of 1581 counted 2,628 inhabitants in the fief (excluding children under seven) in 549 families, with 1,845 cattle and 4,394 sheep and goats. The economy was based on cereals, chestnuts, vines and hemp, and on livestock; a 16th-century commissioner described the area as "pleasant and fruitful, with many vineyards that make excellent wines" and its inhabitants as "rich and engaged in trade, chiefly in livestock and hemp cloth". Seasonal emigration was widespread: men aged sixteen to sixty left after sowing for the Maremma and Corsica and returned after Easter; in 1545 between 20 and 30% of the villages' population left, and at Carobbio half.

=== The Doria, Liberati and Ventura ===
In 1650 Duke Ranuccio II Farnese sold the fief to the marquis Domenico Doria of Genoa. In the early 18th century the Doria built the mills of Capoponte and of the Archetto at Casola to replace the Masere mill, damaged by a flood of the Parma. The marquis Agostino Doria, by his will of 1 November 1756, made his daughter Maria Maddalena his heir; the fief was assigned to her as dowry on 2 March 1763, and in 1764 her husband, Count Luigi Onofrio Liberati, was invested with the marquisate of Tizzano. On 16 May 1775 Marsilio Ventura, formerly chamber physician to Duke Francesco Farnese and first physician at the Spanish court, and his son Troilo obtained the exchange of their fief of Neviano Arduini for Tizzano. The deed of possession describes the castle with a four-storey tower, the prisons, the community bell, the oratory, the well, the oven, the stables, the granaries and the drawbridge; no feudal lord had ever lived there, and it was the residence of the podestà. Troilo Ventura (1741–1814), prime minister of Duke Ferdinand of Bourbon in 1787–1788, was the last feudal lord: the Napoleonic decrees of June 1805 abolished the fiefs from 1 January 1806.

=== Modern era ===
After the abolition of the fief Tizzano became the seat of a municipality, which also absorbed the territory of the former fief of Belvedere, except for Lalatta, Magretto, Pignone, Sansolla and Vezzano; in 1832 the municipality comprised twenty hamlets: Albazzano, Anzola, Capriglio, Carobbio, Carpaneto, Casola, Cozzo, Costa, Groppizioso, Gubinaria, Isola, Madurera, Moragnano, Musiara Inferiore, Musiara Superiore, Pietta, Reno, Rusino, Sternoldo and Treviglio. With the end of the feudal monopoly in 1805 new mills were built, and in the second half of the 19th century more than a dozen were at work. The Ventura property passed in 1816 to Angelo Pettorelli Lalatta, who sold it; the castle was bought by the Castiglioni family of Palanzano. On 9 April 1855 a landslide from Monte Caio destroyed 47 buildings at Carobbio, leaving 300 people homeless.

In 1901 the writer Hilaire Belloc, walking to Rome, described the village as "entirely walled, with a church and a castle in the middle" and its square crowded for the cattle market. In 1903 an aqueduct was built, fed by the Fontana Gelata spring. In 1913 the castle was bought by the sculptor Ettore Ximenes, who intended to make it his summer residence to a design by the architect Cusani; work was interrupted by the First World War and abandoned on the owner's death. On 7 September 1920 the Lunigiana and Garfagnana earthquake made the churches of Capriglio and Cerreto unusable. The rural bank of Moragnano was founded in 1917 and the Piccolo Credito Agricolo Tizzanese in 1919, on the initiative of Senator Giuseppe Micheli; their records document the loans made to those who emigrated in autumn to France, North Africa and Corsica. In 1928 the Rosary oratory, rebuilt in the square in 1791, became the parish church, and the following year the archpriest moved his residence there from the pieve. In the 1930s the town hall moved to a new building; in 1938–1939 the road to Schia was completed, and the first cross-country skiing races were held there.

During the Second World War Tizzano was one of the places of "free internment" for foreign Jewish refugees, and eighteen Jews from the Balkans were housed there; in early December 1943 nine of them were arrested and deported to Auschwitz, together with four Italian Jews who had come to the hamlet of Reno.

In the second half of the 20th century Tizzano became a mountain resort, with the construction of holiday homes and accommodation facilities, while the ski resort of Schia developed on Monte Caio. Most of the mills closed between the post-war years and the 1970s; the Groppo mill, closed in the 1990s, has been restored with its original machinery.

=== Coat of arms ===
The coat of arms is blazoned: Azure, a dexter hand proper issuing from the sinister, holding a brand argent kindled gules. External ornaments of a municipality. The brand (tizzone) echoes the name of the municipality and refers to the local legend according to which a burning brand was found in the foundations during the construction of the castle. The municipal banner (gonfalone) is a white cloth.

=== Honours ===
On 5 October 1994 the municipality of Tizzano Val Parma was awarded the Bronze Medal of Military Valour for the sacrifices of its population and for its part in the partisan struggle during the Second World War. The citation reads:

A municipality in a mountain area where armed resistance against the Nazi-Fascist invasion and oppression developed with particular intensity, it suffered for twenty months the bereavements, horrors and destruction of a guerrilla war fought bitterly over every metre of its territory. Even under the constant threat of reprisals, its people worked unflinchingly alongside the partisans, giving concrete support in every field of organisation and combat, and their contribution made possible the achievement of that shining epic. Tizzano Val Parma, 8 September 1943 – 25 April 1945.

== Main sights ==
=== Religious buildings ===
==== Pieve of San Pietro ====
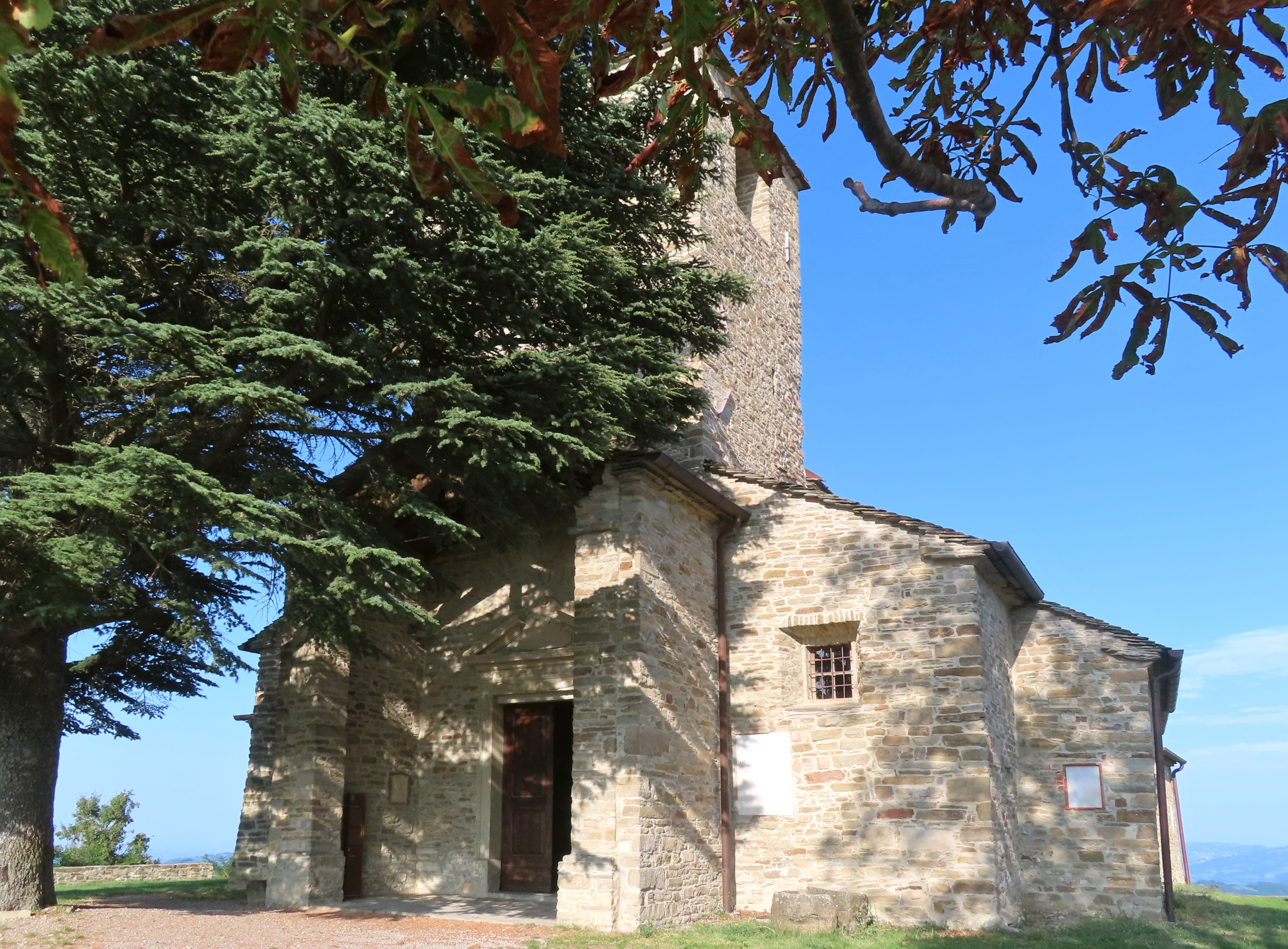
Façade of the pieve of San Pietro

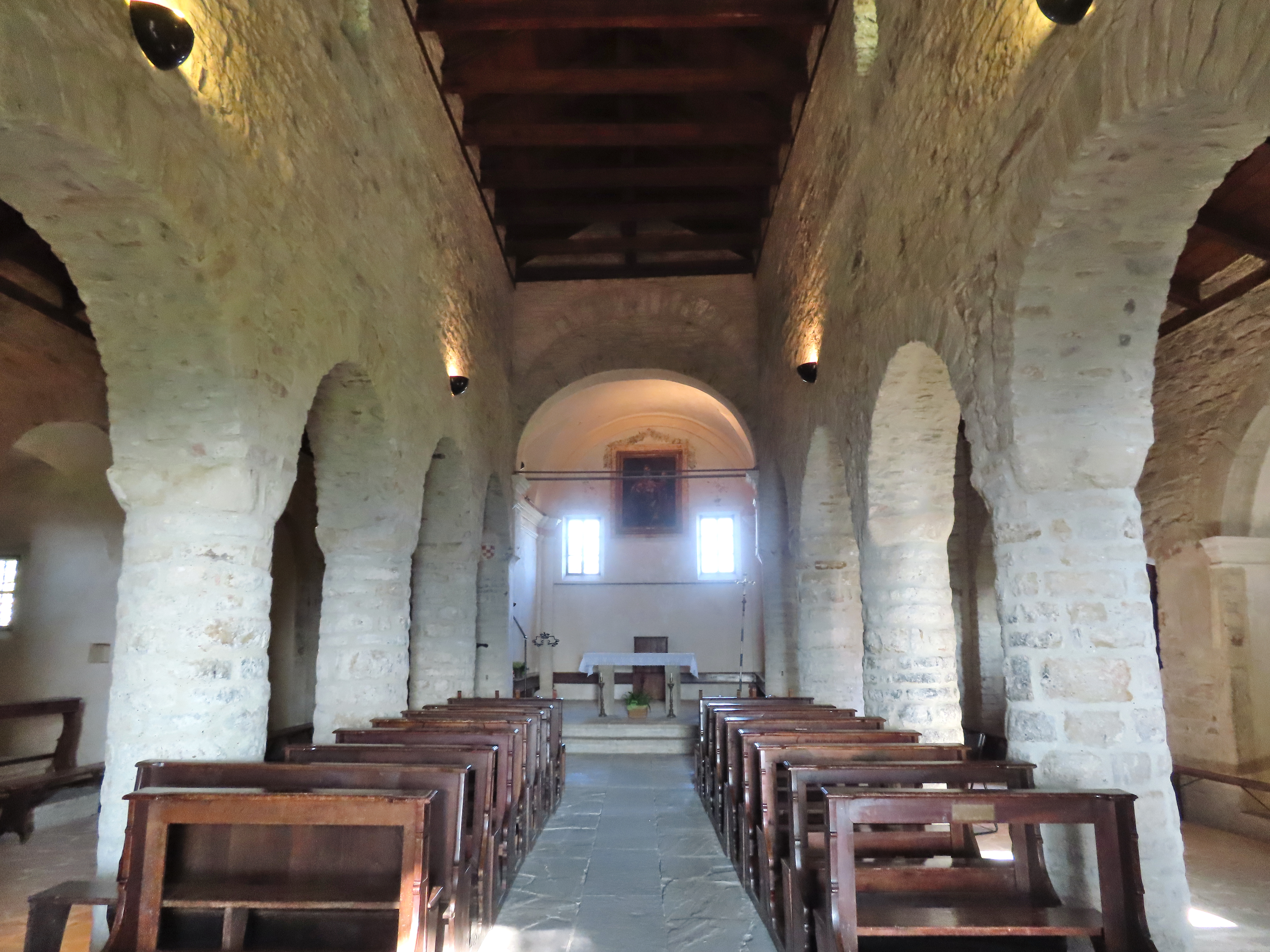
Nave of the pieve of San Pietro

Built on the top of Monte Rotondo almost certainly around the 10th century, the pieve was first mentioned in 1005. It was rebuilt in Romanesque style between the 11th and 12th centuries on a basilica plan with a nave and two aisles, perhaps at the behest of Countess Matilda of Canossa, and was decorated inside with frescoes in 1485. Towards the end of the 15th century the side apses were demolished and an exonarthex was added; in the second half of the 18th century it was remodelled in Neoclassical style. Between 1957 and 1964 it was completely restored, removing almost all the 18th-century additions and moving the fragments of 15th-century frescoes to the oratory of the Madonna del Santo Rosario; it was restored and structurally consolidated between 2010 and 2012. The stone church has a nave and two aisles flanked by three chapels on each side, and an unusual clocher-porche façade, dominated by a massive central bell tower and preceded by a tall gabled exonarthex. The sides preserve various traces of the original structure, including some small splayed single-light windows, parts of the crowning decoration of hanging arches and the carved archivolt of the side entrance. Inside, the nave and aisles, covered by wooden truss roofs, are divided by arcades resting on massive columns with roughly hewn cushion capitals; at the end, the plastered presbytery keeps its 18th-century lunetted barrel vault. The church houses several works of value, including the altarpiece and an 18th-century processional canopy.

==== Oratory of the Madonna del Santo Rosario ====
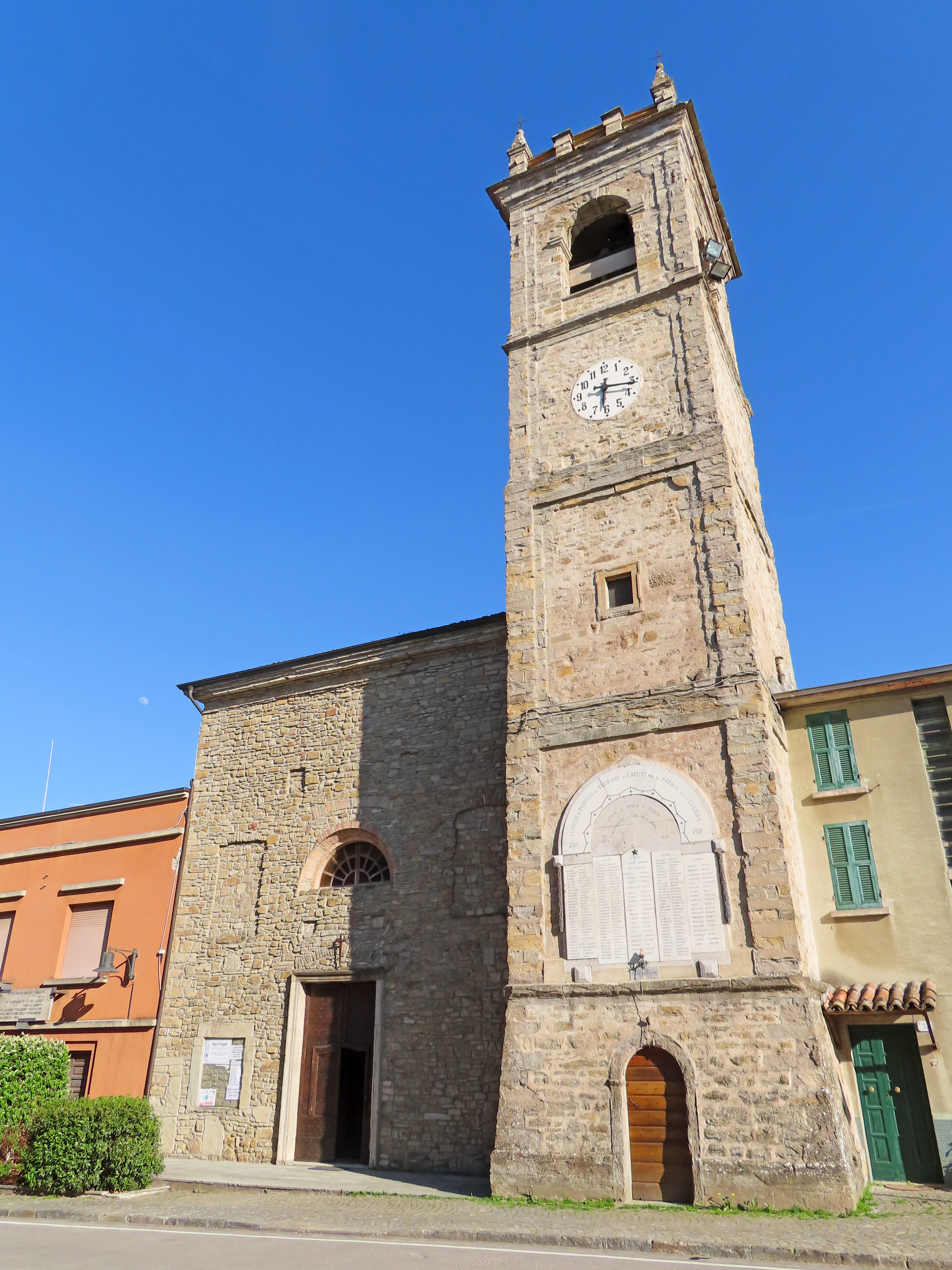
Oratory of the Madonna del Santo Rosario

Built in the early 16th century within the new village of Tizzano, the oratory was rebuilt in 1791 by the Confraternity of the Rosary and completed in the following years with the bell tower; damaged by an earthquake in 2008, it was completely restored between 2010 and 2012. The single-nave building has a simple rectangular stone façade, flanked by a massive four-storey bell tower. Inside, the hall, divided into three vaulted bays, houses five detached late-15th-century frescoes from the pieve of San Pietro; at the end of the presbytery stands a monumental Neoclassical altarpiece frame containing a contemporary statue of the Madonna of the Rosary with Child.

==== Church of San Genesio, Albazzano ====
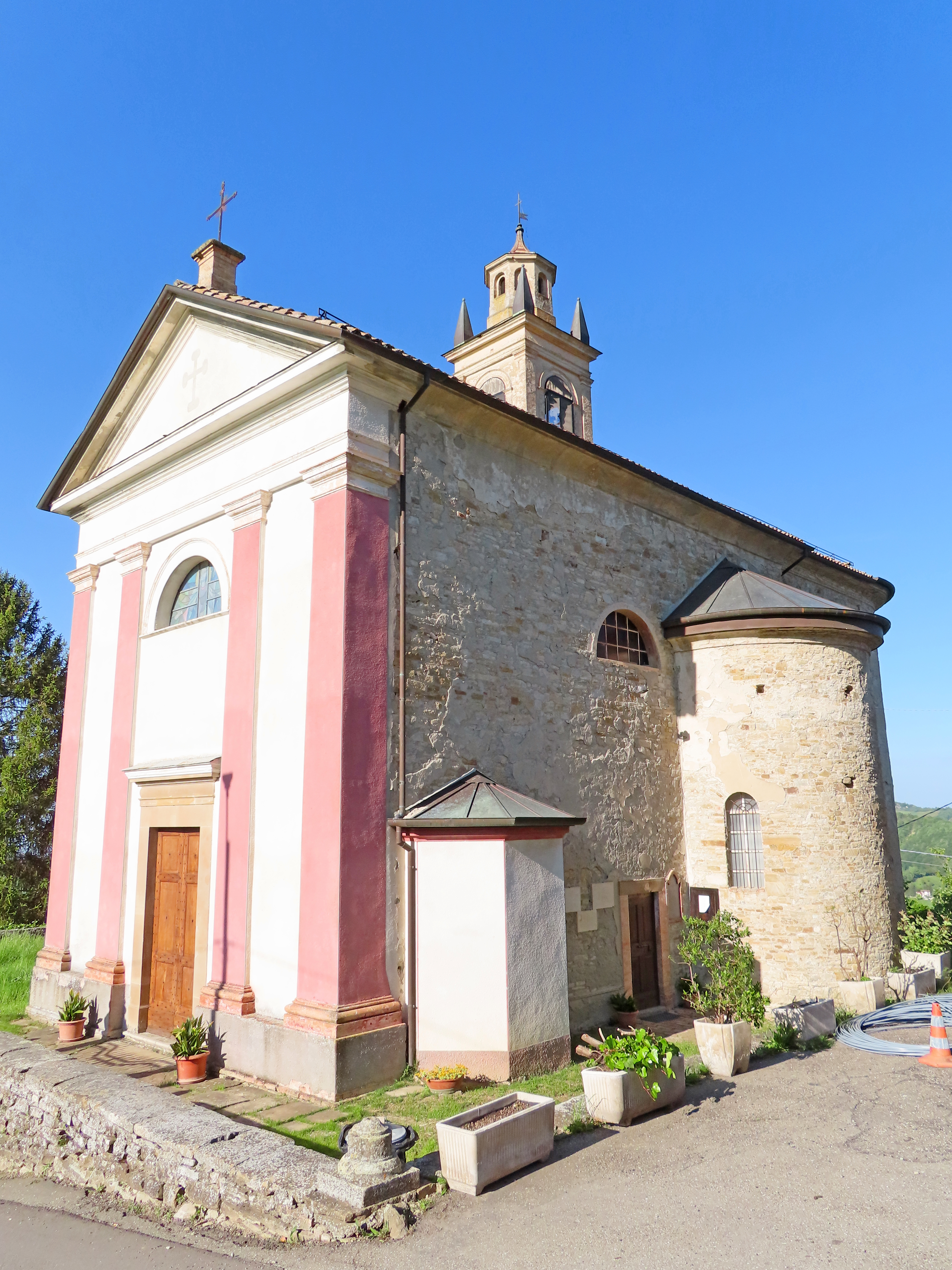
Church of San Genesio at Albazzano

First mentioned in 1230, the original chapel was destroyed by a landslide in 1500 together with the village of Albazzano. Rebuilt further uphill, the church became an independent parish in 1564; enlarged around the middle of the 17th century, towards the end of the 18th century it was given a bell tower and a new Neoclassical façade. Altered and decorated inside in the second half of the 19th century, it was fully restored in 1950. The building has a single nave with two side chapels and a gabled façade divided by four pilasters and crowned by a triangular pediment. The hall, decorated with Empire style stucco, has a fresco of the Pietà painted by Walter Madoi in 1970; the apsed presbytery and the chapels house several works of value.

==== Church of Santi Giovanni Battista e Maurizio, Anzolla ====
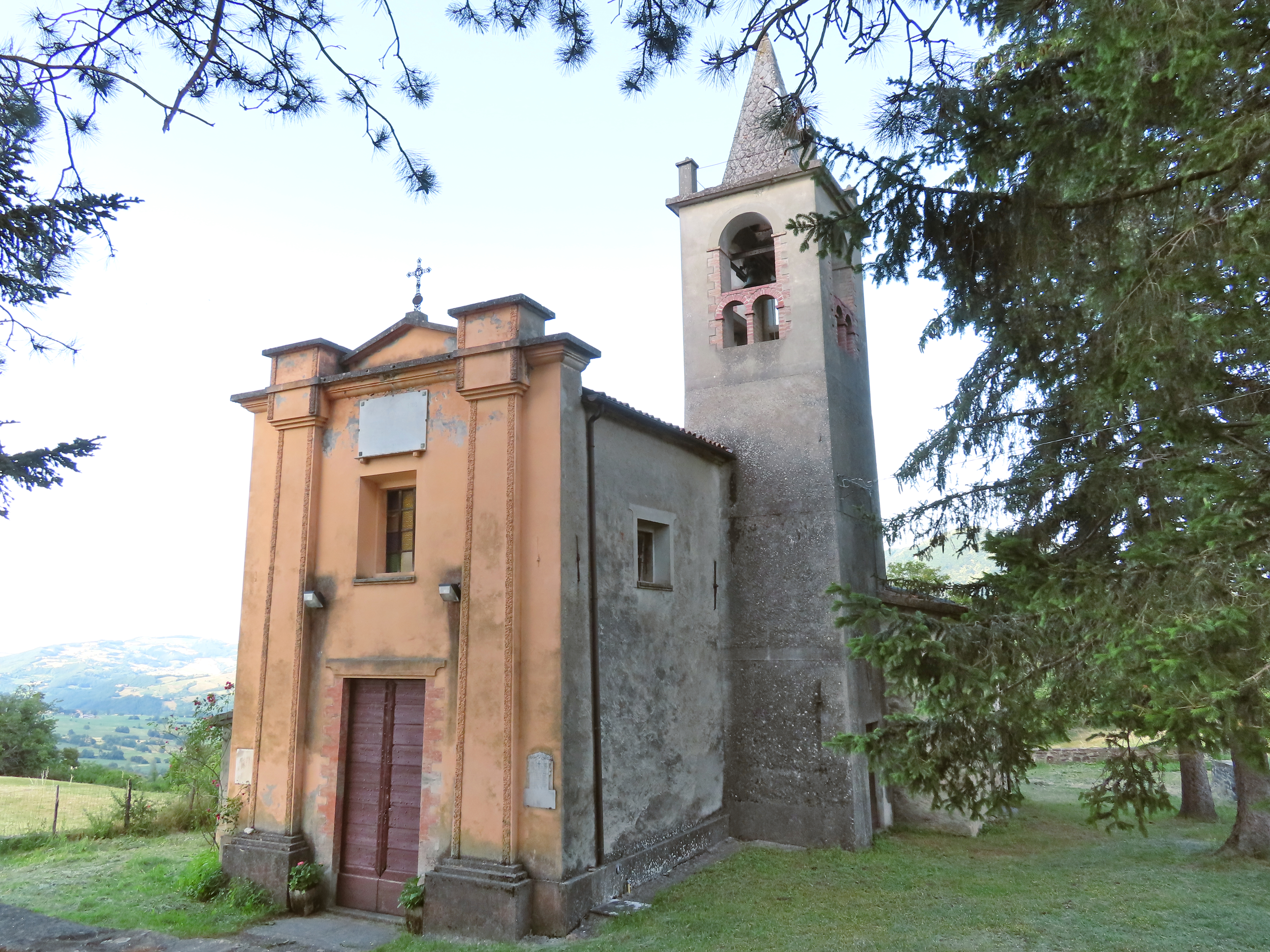
Church of Santi Giovanni Battista e Maurizio at Anzolla

First mentioned in 1230, the chapel of Anzolla was united in 1367 with that of Antognola; it became an independent parish in 1564, was completely remodelled in Baroque style between the 17th and 18th centuries and was rearranged inside in 1829. The building has a single nave flanked by a chapel on each side and a plastered façade divided by massive pilasters and topped by a small pediment. The nave, covered by a lunetted barrel vault, houses a polychrome Baroque wooden altarpiece frame containing fifteen small paintings dated 1664.

==== Church of San Michele, Capriglio ====
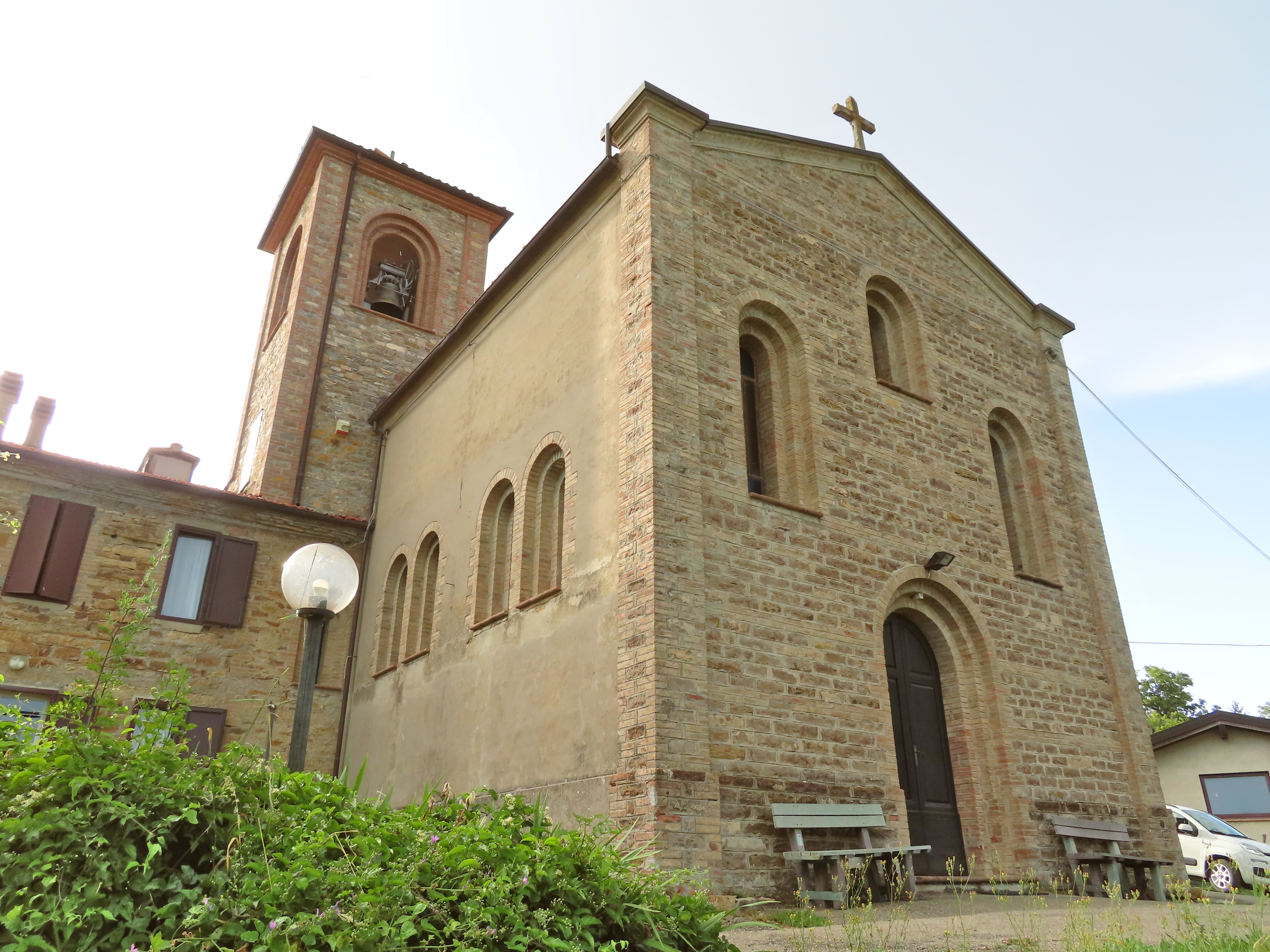
Church of San Michele at Capriglio

First mentioned in 1230, the chapel of Capriglio became an independent parish in 1564, which was however moved in 1612 to the old oratory of Casagalvana. Rebuilt in 1622, the church of Casagalvana collapsed in the earthquake of 1920; a new church in Romanesque Revival style was built at Capriglio between 1930 and 1935, and the bell tower was added in 2002. The building has a single nave flanked by a chapel on each side and a gabled façade entirely faced in stone, with a portal and three single-light windows with deeply splayed round arches. The barrel-vaulted hall houses an oil painting of 1520 depicting the Madonna in Glory with Child, Angels and Saints Michael the Archangel, Roch and Sebastian, attributed to Michelangelo Anselmi.

==== Church of San Maurizio, Carobbio ====
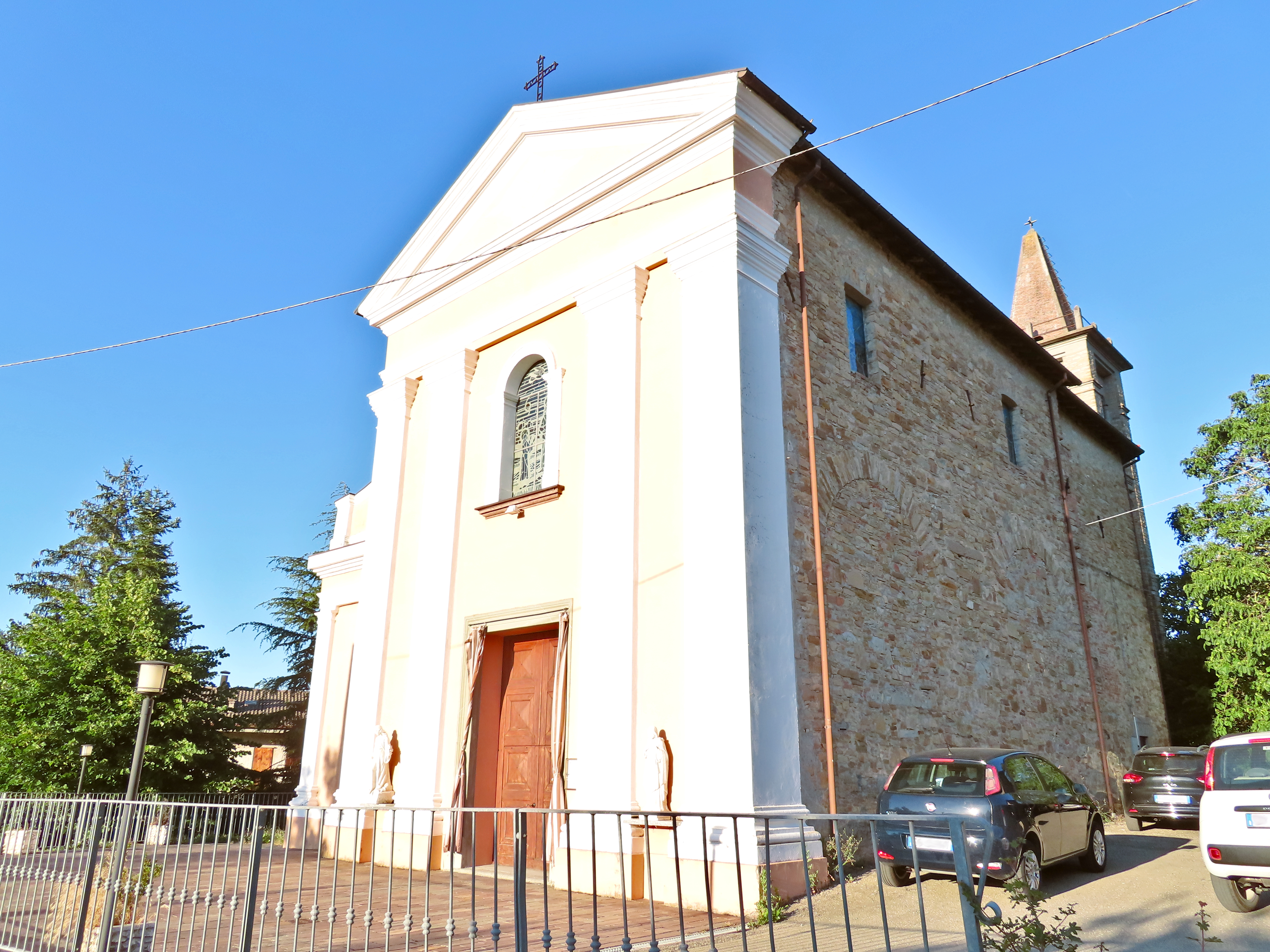
Church of San Maurizio at Carobbio

First mentioned in 1230, the original chapel of Carobbio, united in 1564 with the church of Santa Giustina at Casola in a single parish, became fully independent in 1621. Rebuilt in the early decades of the 19th century, it was destroyed by a landslide in 1855 and completely rebuilt in Neoclassical style between 1861 and 1866; the bell tower was added in 1924, and the church was restored in 1964. The building has a single nave with three chapels on the left and a façade divided by four Doric pilasters and crowned by a pediment; the hall, decorated with pilasters and arches, houses several works of value.

==== Church of Sant'Andrea Apostolo, Carpaneto ====
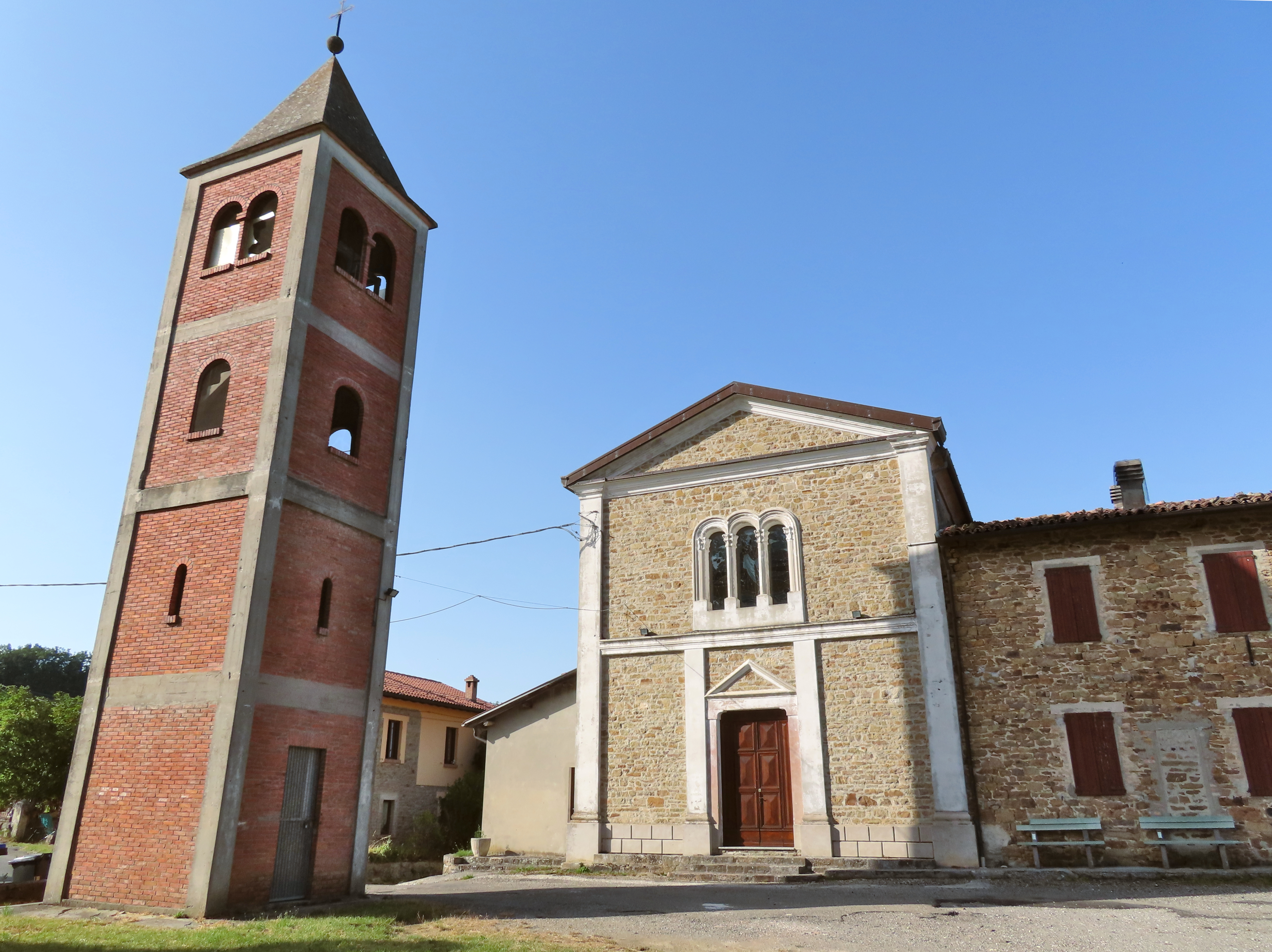
Church of Sant'Andrea Apostolo at Carpaneto

First mentioned in 1230, the original chapel, at Cerreto, became an independent parish in 1564. Rebuilt at the beginning of the 18th century, it was destroyed by a devastating earthquake in 1920; it was rebuilt at Carpaneto between 1926 and 1928, and the bell tower was added in 1962. The church has a single nave flanked by a chapel on each side and a symmetrical gabled stone façade on two orders, crowned by a triangular pediment. The hall, decorated with pilasters, ends in an apsed presbytery and houses several works of value from the old church.

==== Church of Santa Giustina, Casola ====
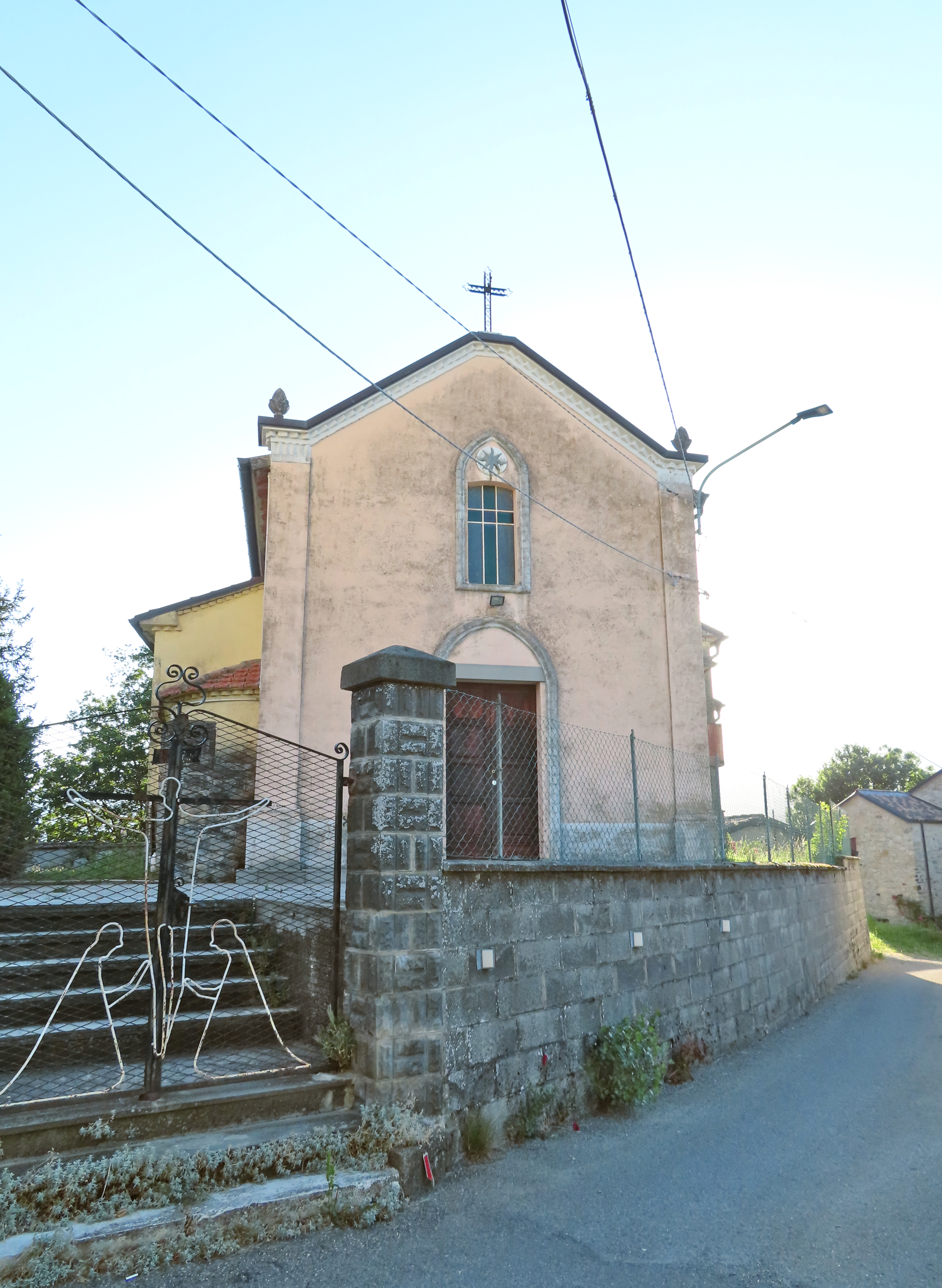
Church of Santa Giustina at Casola

First mentioned in 1230, the original chapel of Casola, united in 1564 with the church of San Maurizio at Carobbio in a single parish, became fully independent in 1621. Abandoned after the middle of the 17th century, it was replaced by a new Baroque church built in 1660–1661. The building has a single nave flanked by a chapel on each side and a plastered gabled façade in Gothic Revival forms; the hall, covered by groin vaults, is decorated with Doric pilasters and houses several works of value.

==== Church of the Assunzione di Maria Vergine, Isola ====
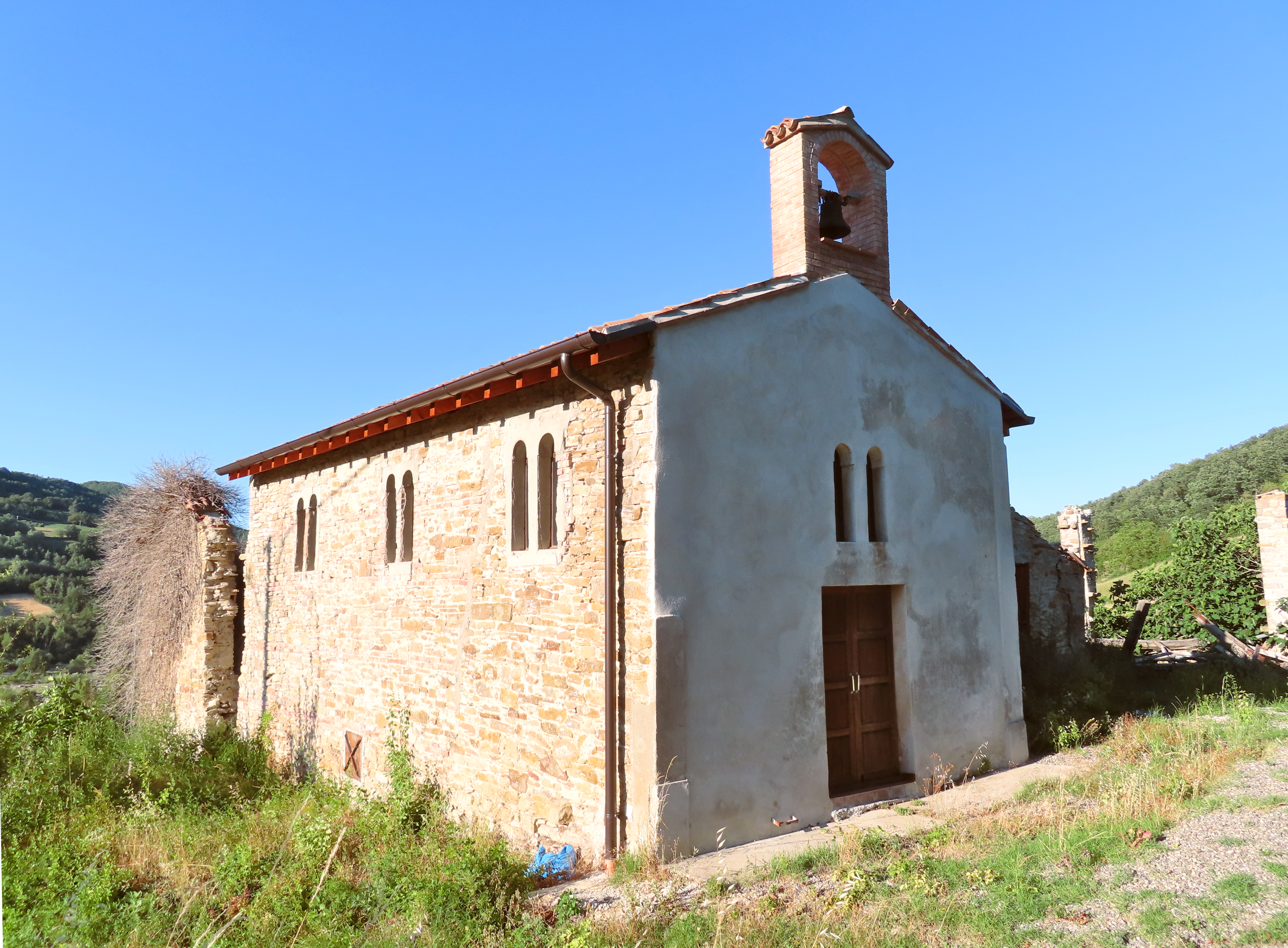
Church of the Assunzione di Maria Vergine at Isola

First mentioned in 1015, the original chapel of Isola fell into ruin in the 15th century; later restored, it became an independent parish in 1583. Rebuilt in 1930, it was completely renovated between 2018 and 2023. The small single-nave building has a simple gabled façade topped by a central bell gable.

==== Church of Santa Giuliana, Lagrimone ====
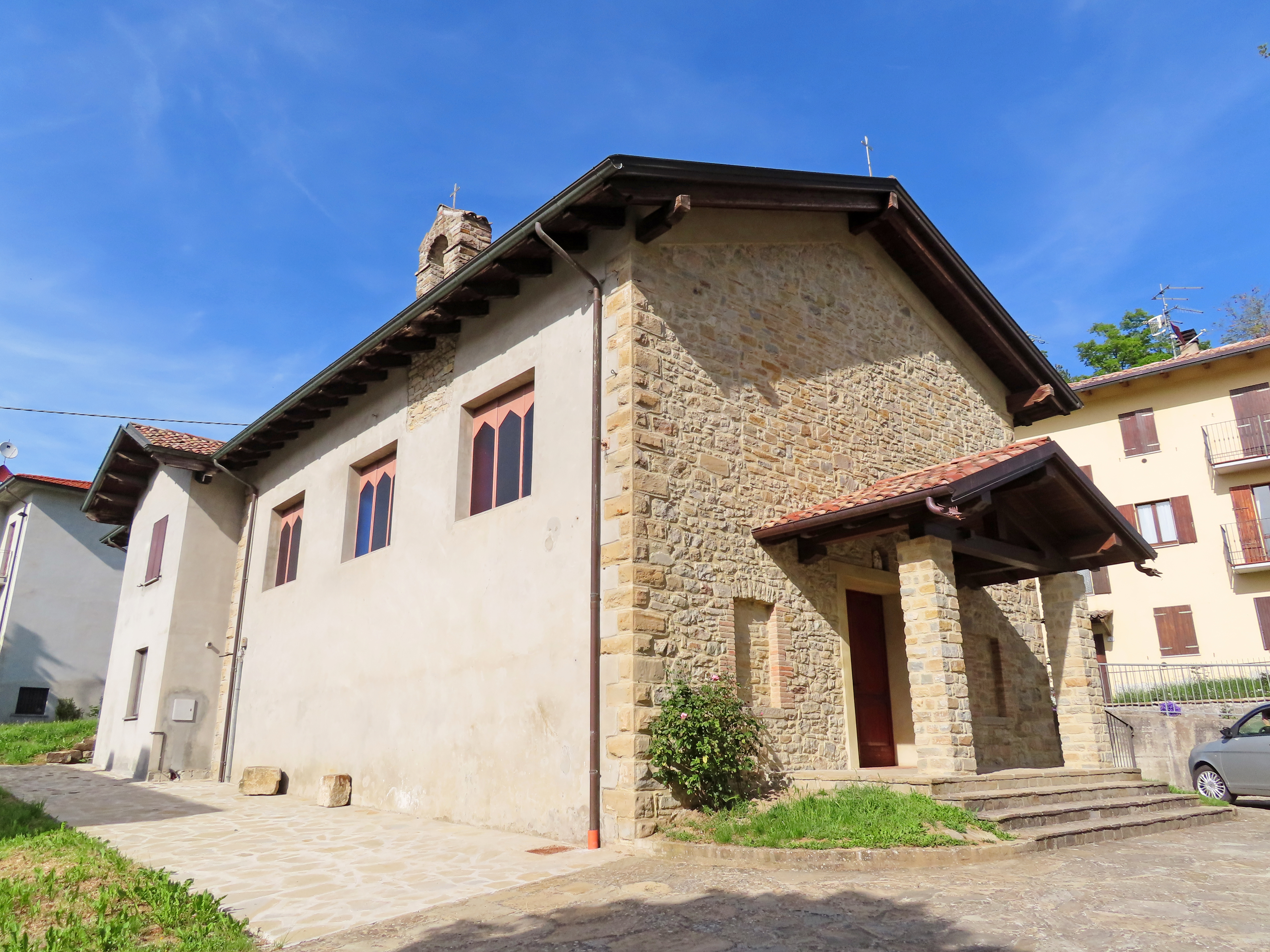
Church of Santa Giuliana at Lagrimone

Originally used as a cowshed, the building at Lagrimone was donated by Demetrio Scaccaglia in 1964 and turned into a church between 1970 and 1972; altered inside between 1984 and 1986, it underwent work on the roofs between 1996 and 2001 and on the main front in 2016. The single-nave building has a gabled stone façade preceded by a central porch with a pitched roof on two pillars. The hall, with a wooden truss ceiling, is lit by a series of large side windows; the slightly raised presbytery is partly enclosed by a semicircular wall imitating an apse with a semi-dome, and in the middle stands the terracotta high altar, added in 1986.

==== Church of Santa Giuliana, Moragnano ====
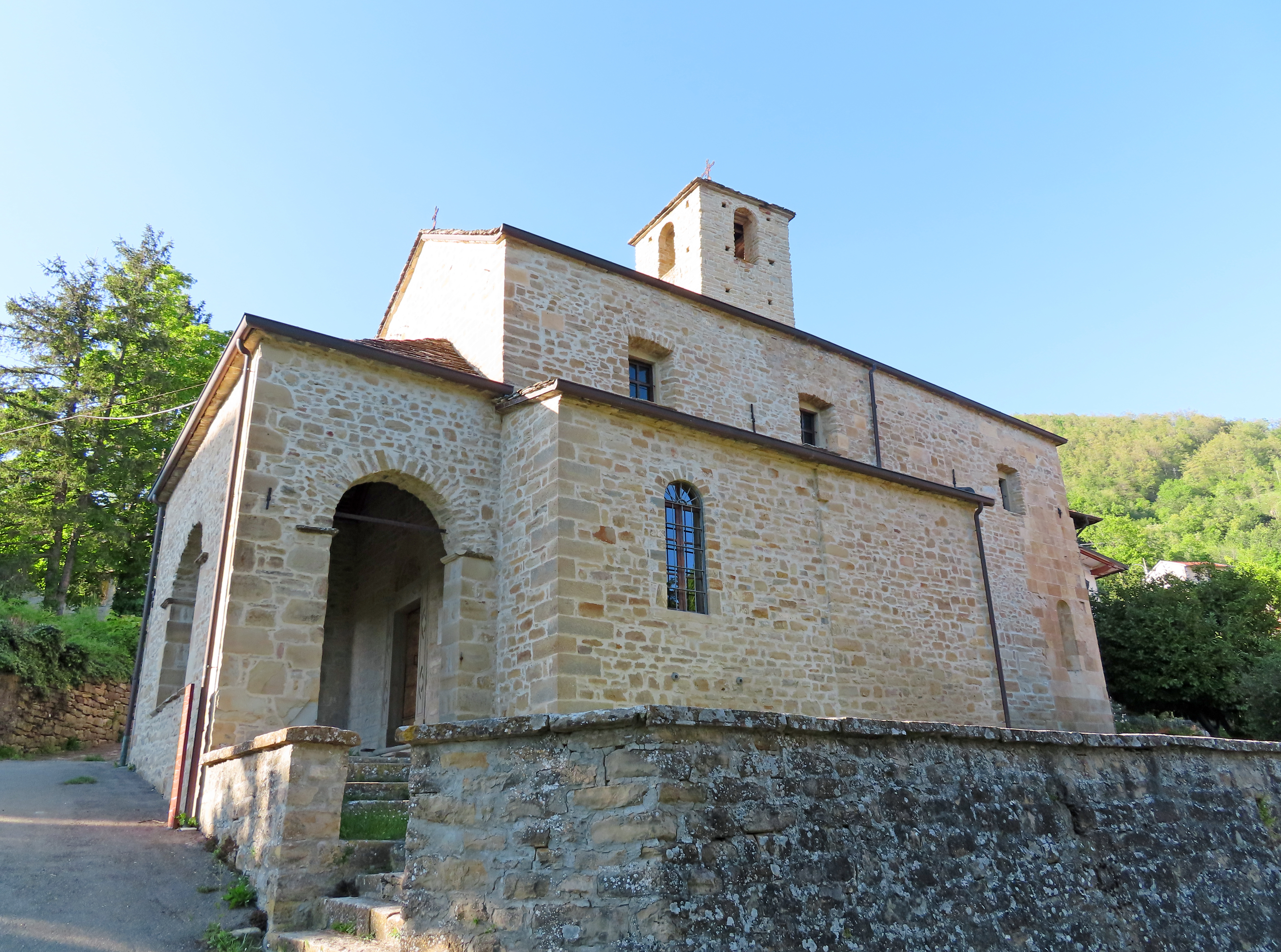
Church of Santa Giuliana at Moragnano

Probably built in the 9th or 10th century but first mentioned in 1230, the small chapel of Moragnano, with a semicircular apse, was enlarged in Romanesque style in 1340. It became an independent parish in 1564, an exonarthex was added in the 16th century and the interior was decorated in Baroque style in the 17th century. Damaged during the Second World War, it was later renovated; the hall was rearranged between 1970 and 1980, and the church was fully restored between 2007 and 2009. The building has a single nave flanked by two chapels on the right and one on the left, and is faced outside with irregular blocks of sandstone; the two ancient main and side portals are crowned by lunettes carved in bas-relief. The 12th-century apse is decorated with a crowning band of hanging arches on small corbels and bears on both sides about 2,000 graffiti carved between the 12th and 17th centuries. The plastered interior, decorated with stucco, houses several works of value, including a 17th-century oil painting by Pietro Melchiorre Ferrari.

==== Church of San Giorgio, Musiara Inferiore ====
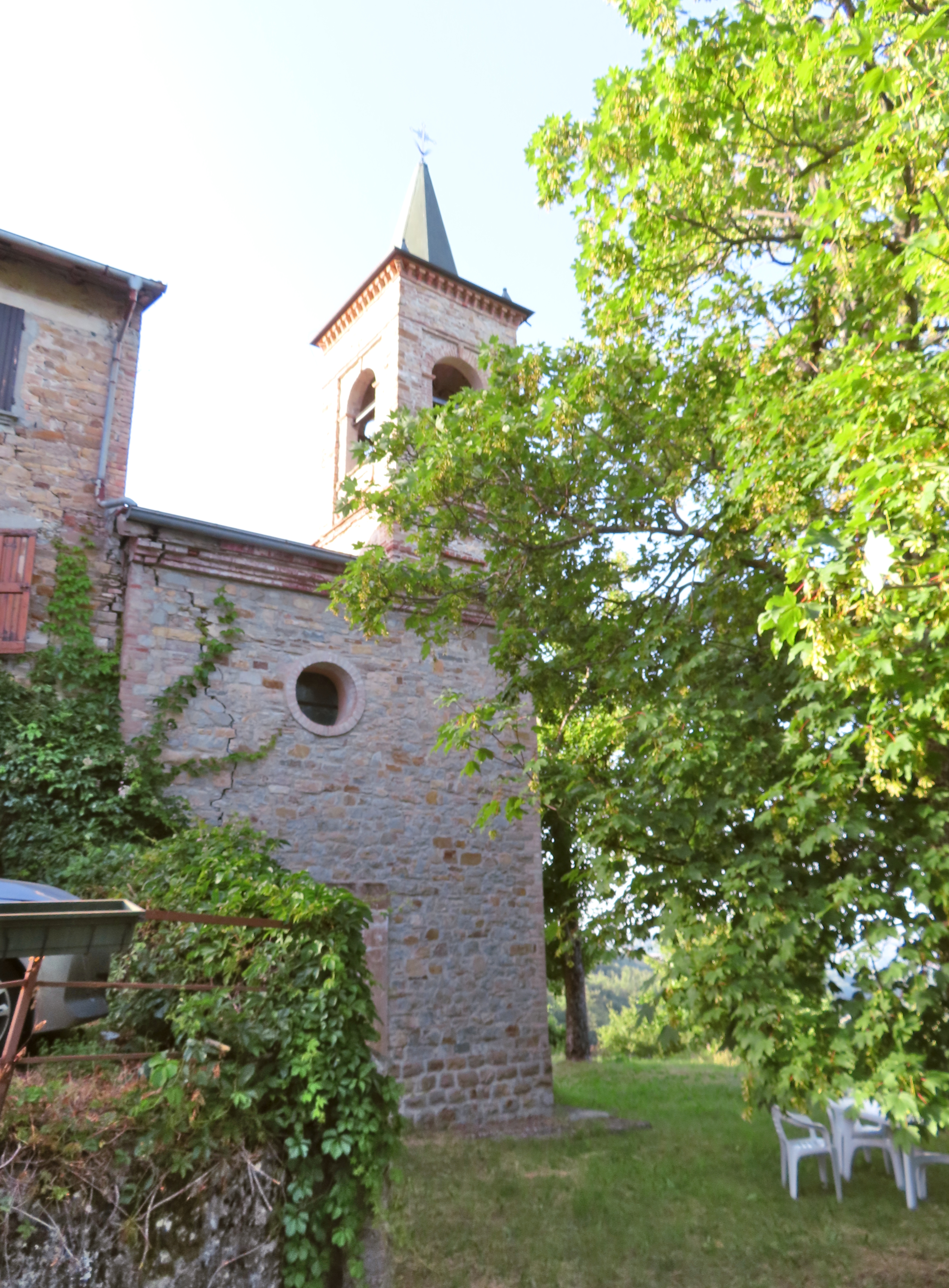
Church of San Giorgio at Musiara Inferiore

First mentioned in 1230, the original chapel of Fontanafredda became a parish in 1564 and was separated from the chapel of San Rocco at Musiara Superiore in 1613. Abandoned towards the end of the 17th century because it was in ruins, it was later rebuilt at Musiara Inferiore in Baroque style. The building has a single nave flanked by a chapel on each side and a simple rectangular façade entirely faced in stone; the plastered hall, covered by a lunetted barrel vault, is divided into three bays by pilasters supporting the cornice.

==== Church of San Rocco, Musiara Superiore ====
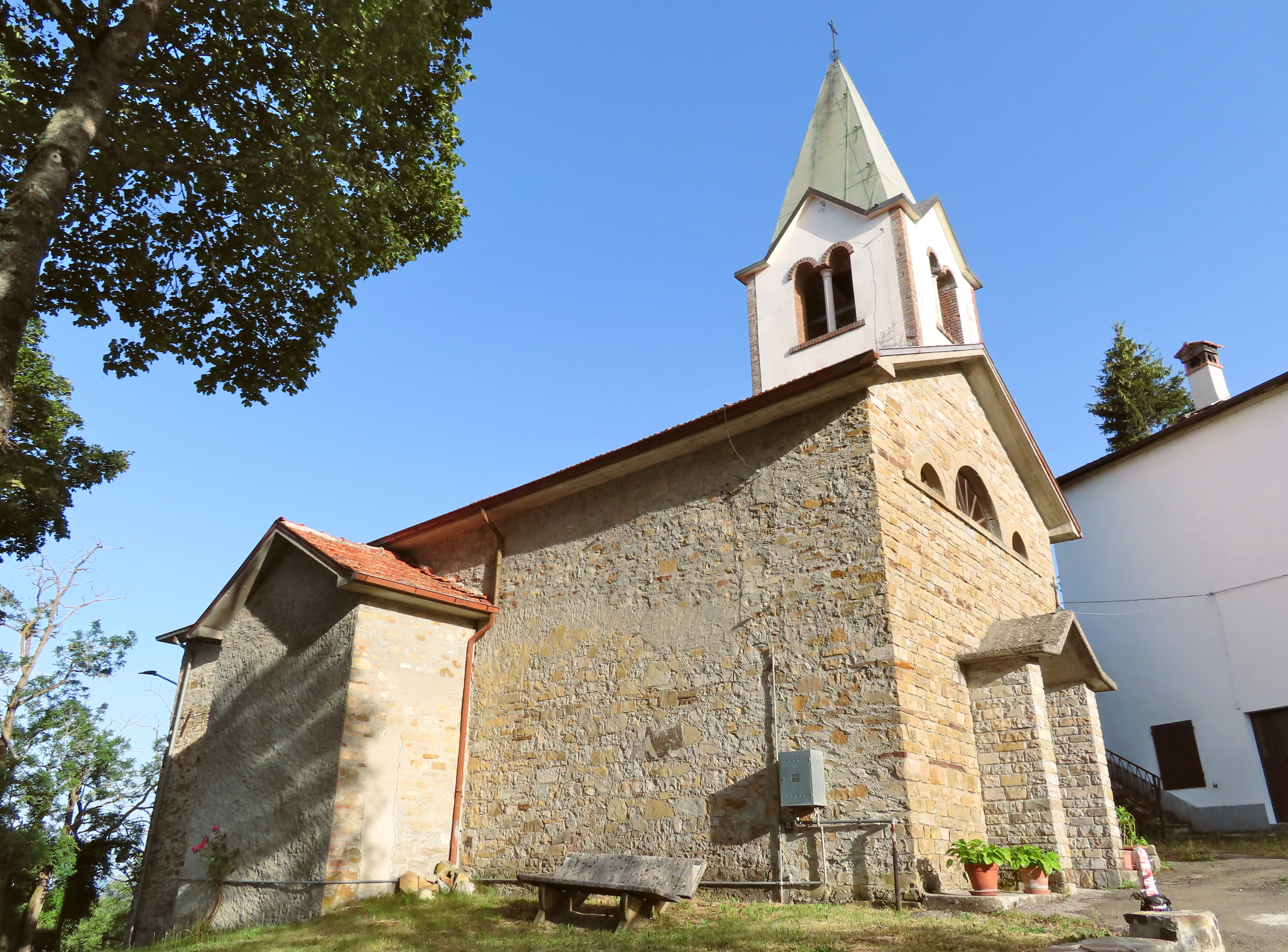
Church of San Rocco at Musiara Superiore

First mentioned in 1491, the oratory of Musiara Superiore, long united with the church of San Giorgio at Musiara Inferiore, became an independent parish in 1613 at the request of the villagers. The building has a single nave with a chapel on the left and a gabled façade entirely faced in stone, with a small central porch; on the right rises the Gothic Revival bell tower. The plastered hall opens onto the presbytery, which houses a 19th-century altarpiece by Giovanni Tebaldi.

==== Church of San Lorenzo, Pratolungo ====
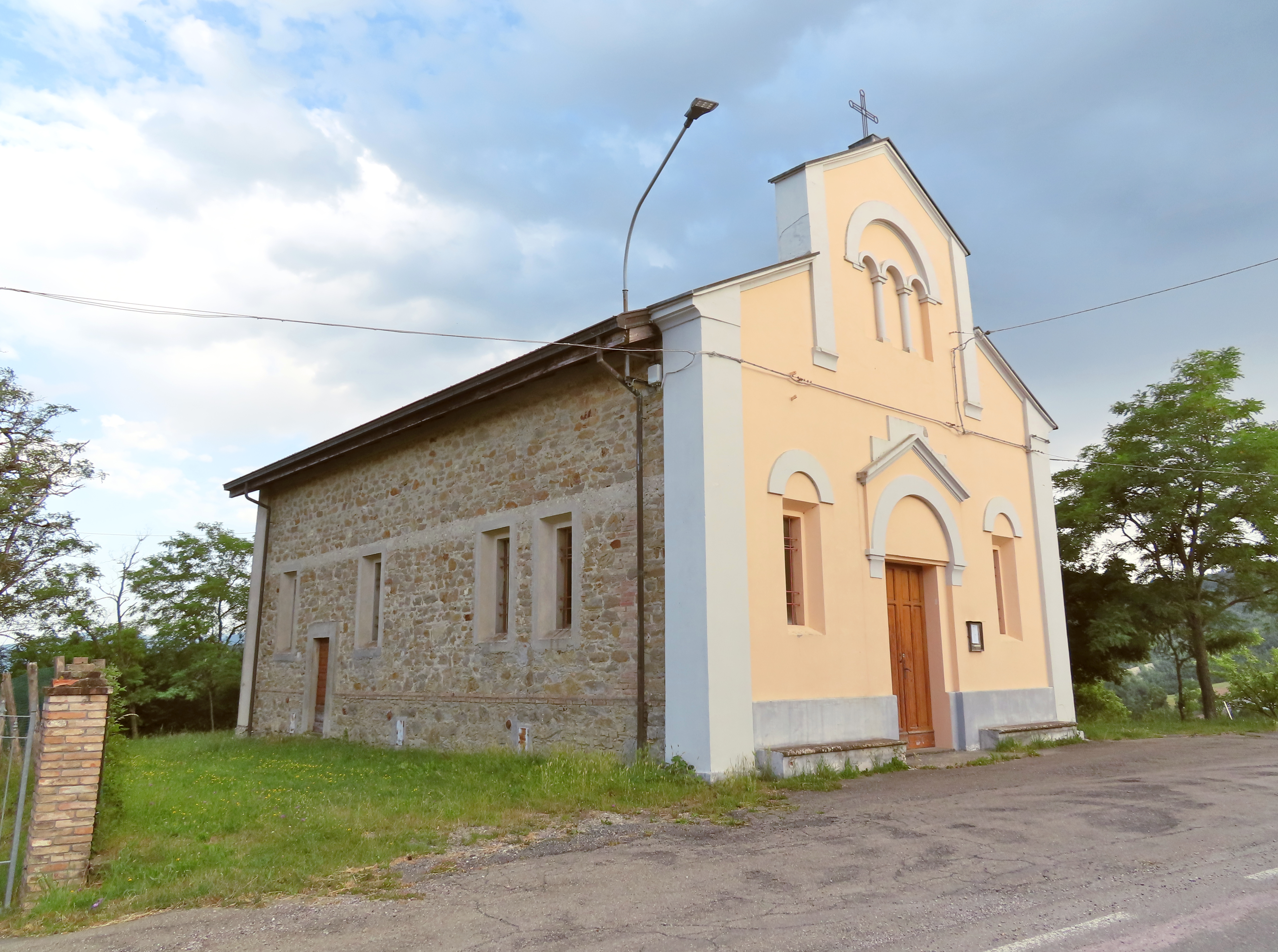
Church of San Lorenzo at Pratolungo

First mentioned in 1230, the small original chapel of Madurera was united by 1354 with the chapel of Santa Giuliana at Moragnano. Rebuilt in the first half of the 16th century, it became an independent parish in 1646; badly decayed, it was abandoned in 1925 and replaced by a new church in Romanesque Revival style built at nearby Pratolungo. Damaged by subsidence in the presbytery area, it was renovated around 1950 and again in 1985, after the roof collapsed under heavy snow. The single-nave building has a plastered stepped façade, decorated with a pediment over the entrance and a large blind three-light window at the top.

==== Church of San Nicolò, Reno ====
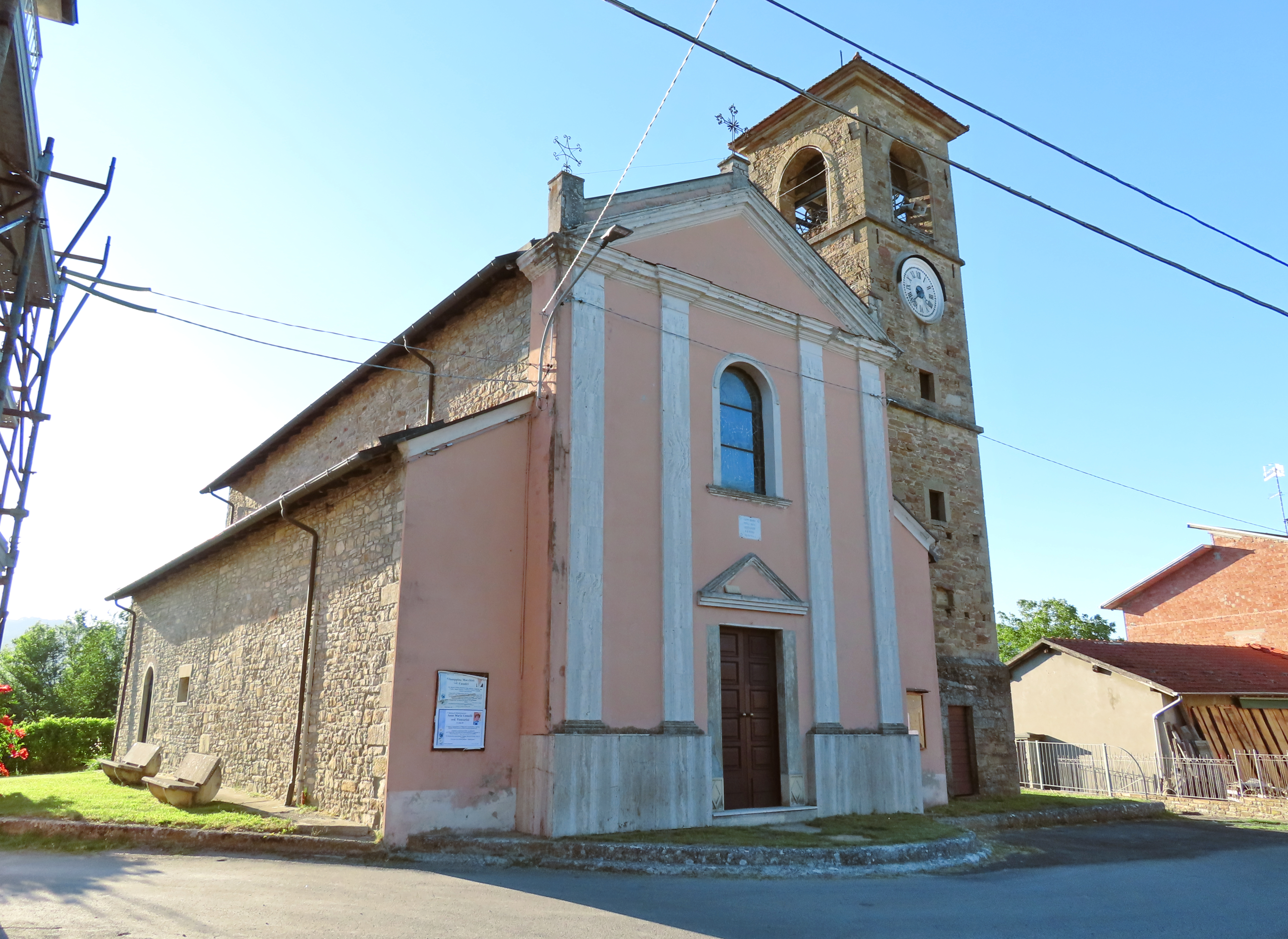
Church of San Nicolò at Reno

First mentioned in 1230, the original chapel of Reno, which became an independent parish in 1564, was destroyed by a landslide around 1765. The Neoclassical church was rebuilt at Reno di Sopra between 1768 and 1773; its façade was restored in 1909 and again around 1960. The building has a single nave flanked by two chapels on each side and a plastered stepped façade divided by four pilasters supporting a triangular pediment; the hall, divided by pilasters, houses several paintings of value.

==== Church of the Beata Vergine della Neve, Rusino ====
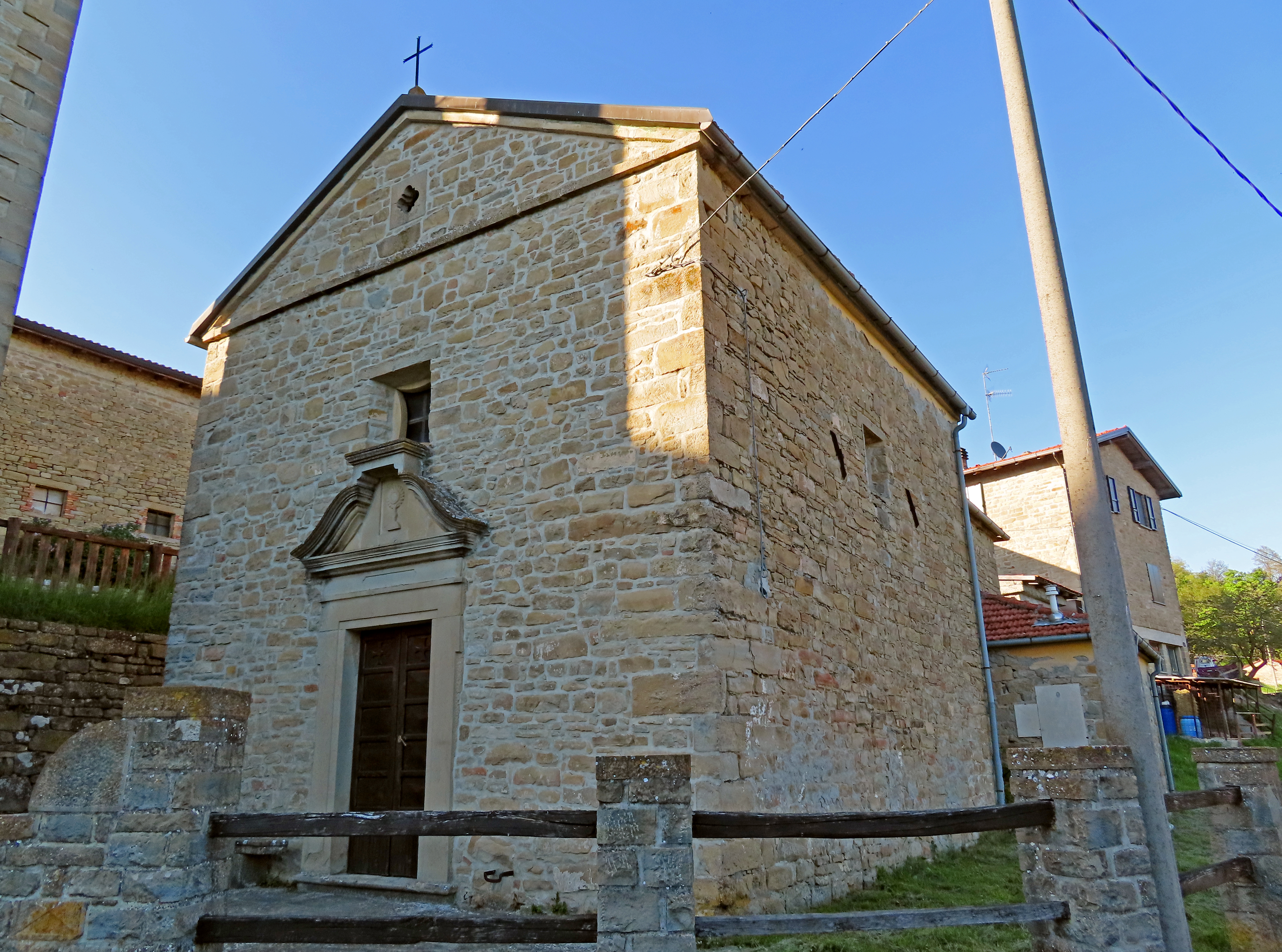
Church of the Beata Vergine della Neve at Rusino

Built as an oratory in the 16th century, the Baroque church of Rusino became a parish in 1692. Damaged by Allied bombing during the Second World War, it was rebuilt in its original form after the war; faced in stone outside, it is decorated with frescoes on the lunetted barrel vault of the presbytery.

==== Oratory of San Maurizio, Antognola ====
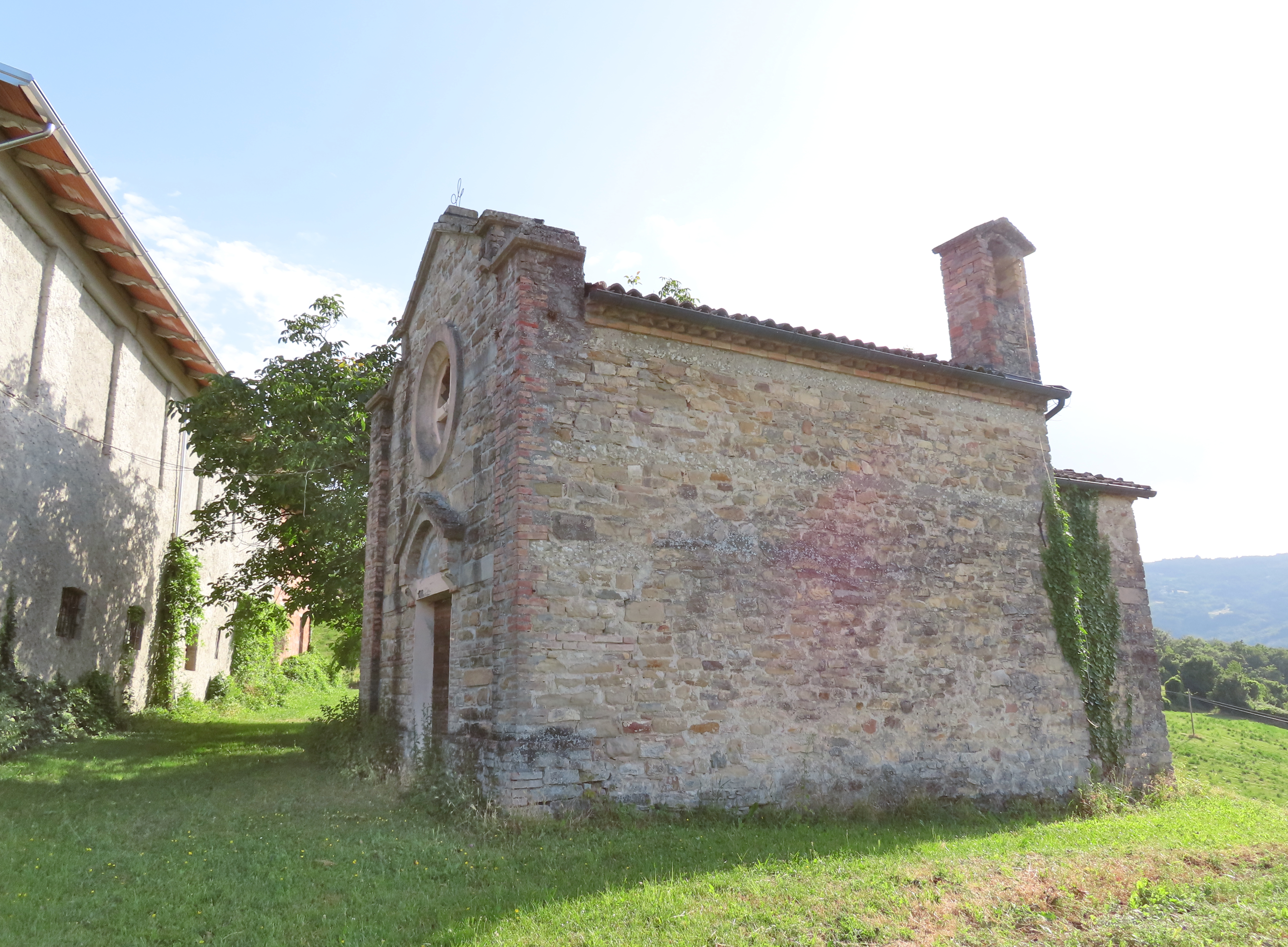
Oratory of San Maurizio at Antognola

First mentioned in 1230, the chapel of Antognola was united in 1367 with that of Anzolla; it became a subsidiary church of the latter in 1564 and was rebuilt in Baroque style in 1680. The small single-nave building has a stone façade framed by two pilasters and crowned by a broken mixtilinear pediment; inside, the nave, with a flat ceiling, ends in a barrel-vaulted presbytery.

==== Oratory of San Bartolomeo, Groppizioso ====
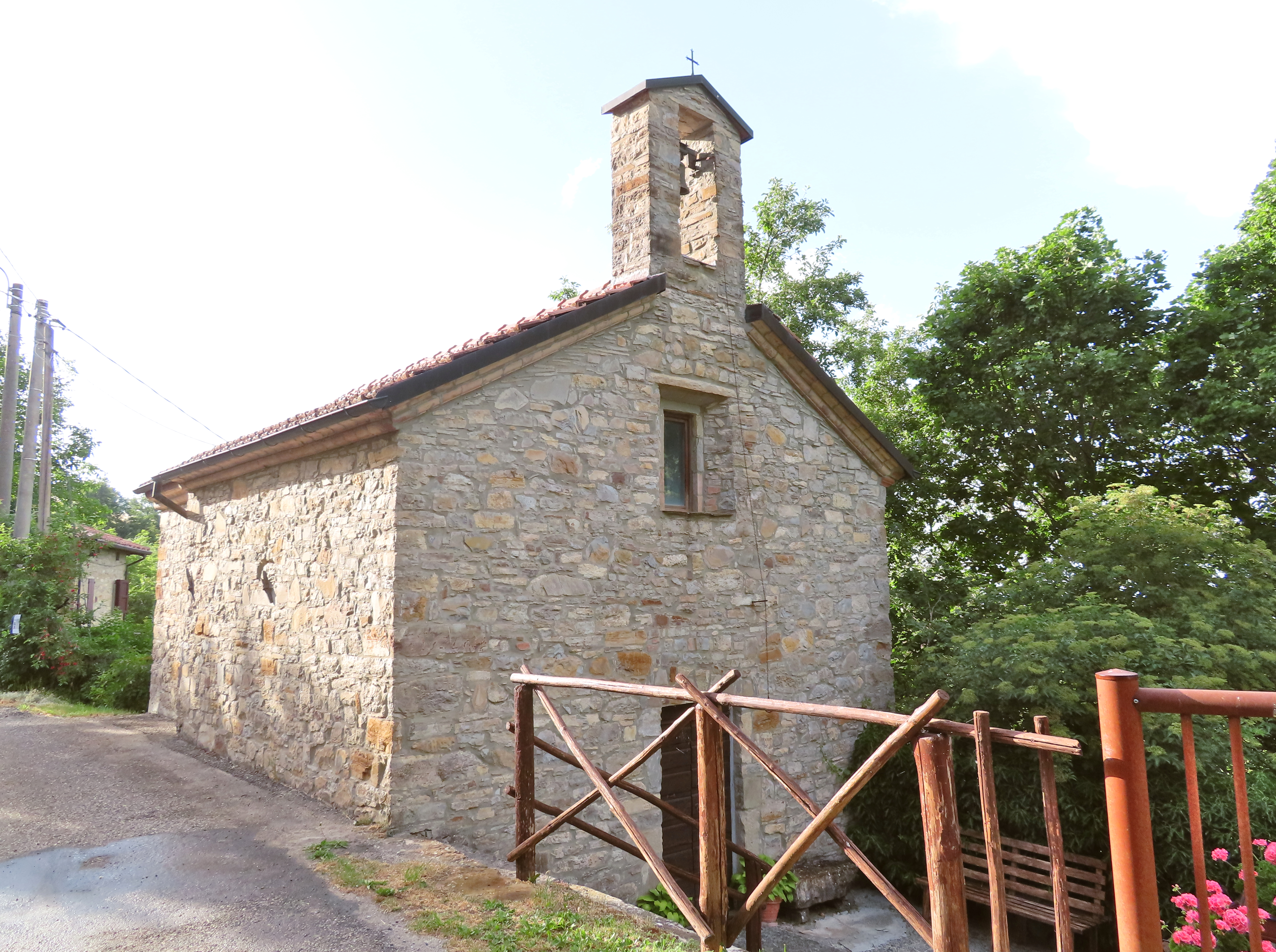
Oratory of San Bartolomeo at Groppizioso

Built around 1660 at the wish of Bartolomeo Danni, parish priest of Anzolla, the Baroque oratory of Groppizioso was destroyed by a landslide towards the end of the 19th century and later rebuilt; it became a subsidiary of the church of Capriglio in 1947 and was fully restored at the beginning of the 21st century. The small single-nave building has a gabled stone façade topped in the middle by a bell gable.

==== Oratory of San Michele, Pietta ====
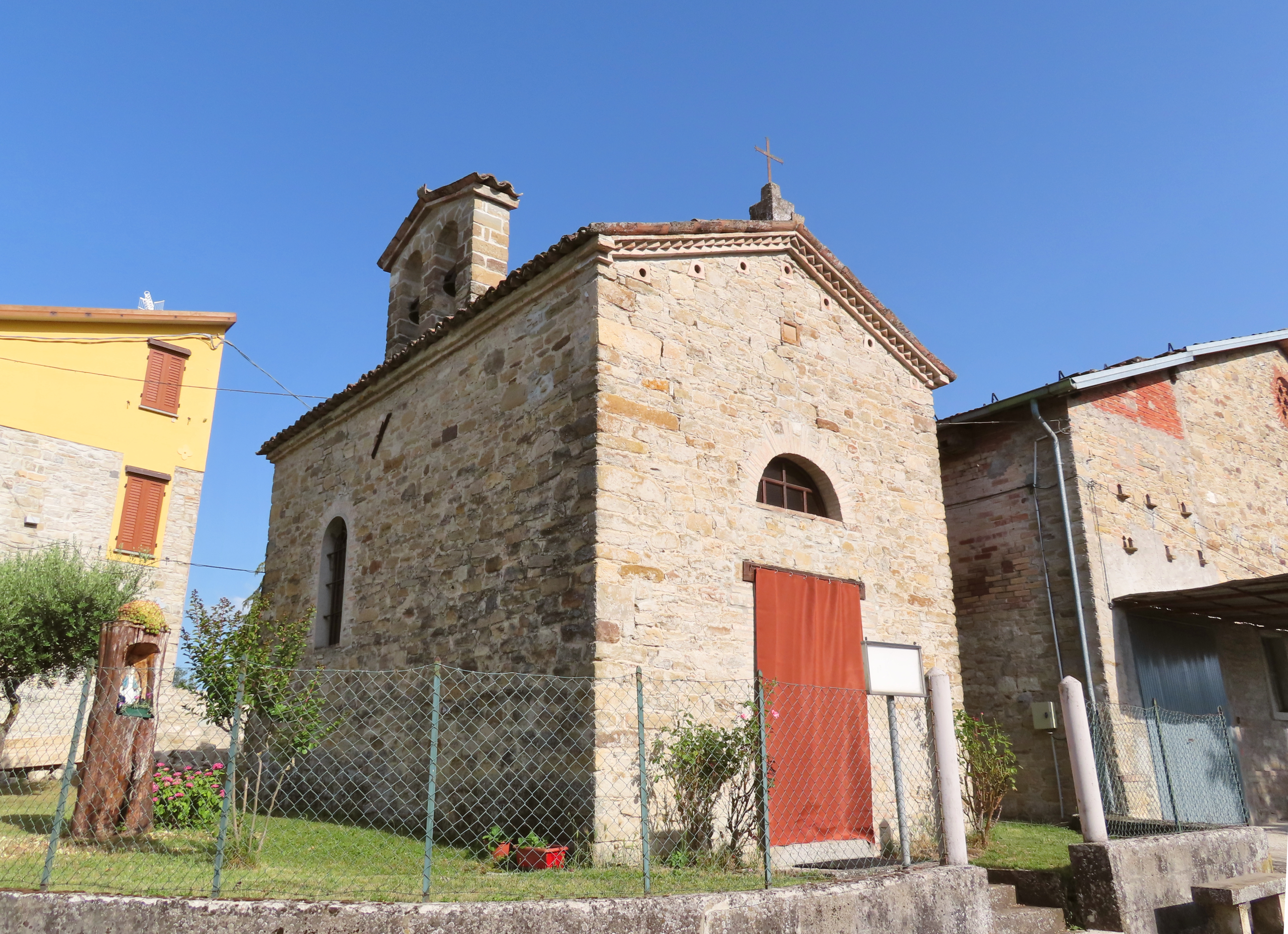
Oratory of San Michele at Pietta

First mentioned in 1230, the original chapel of Pietta was united with that of Vezzano from 1299 to 1564, when it became a subsidiary of the parish church of Vezzano. Completely destroyed by an earthquake in 1898, the oratory was rebuilt in Romanesque Revival style in 1904; damaged by an earthquake in 1983, it was later renovated. Declared unsafe in 2014 because of a landslide, it was restored and reopened for worship in 2018. The small single-nave building has a simple gabled stone façade; inside, the hall is covered by a plastered barrel vault.

=== Military buildings ===
==== Castle ====
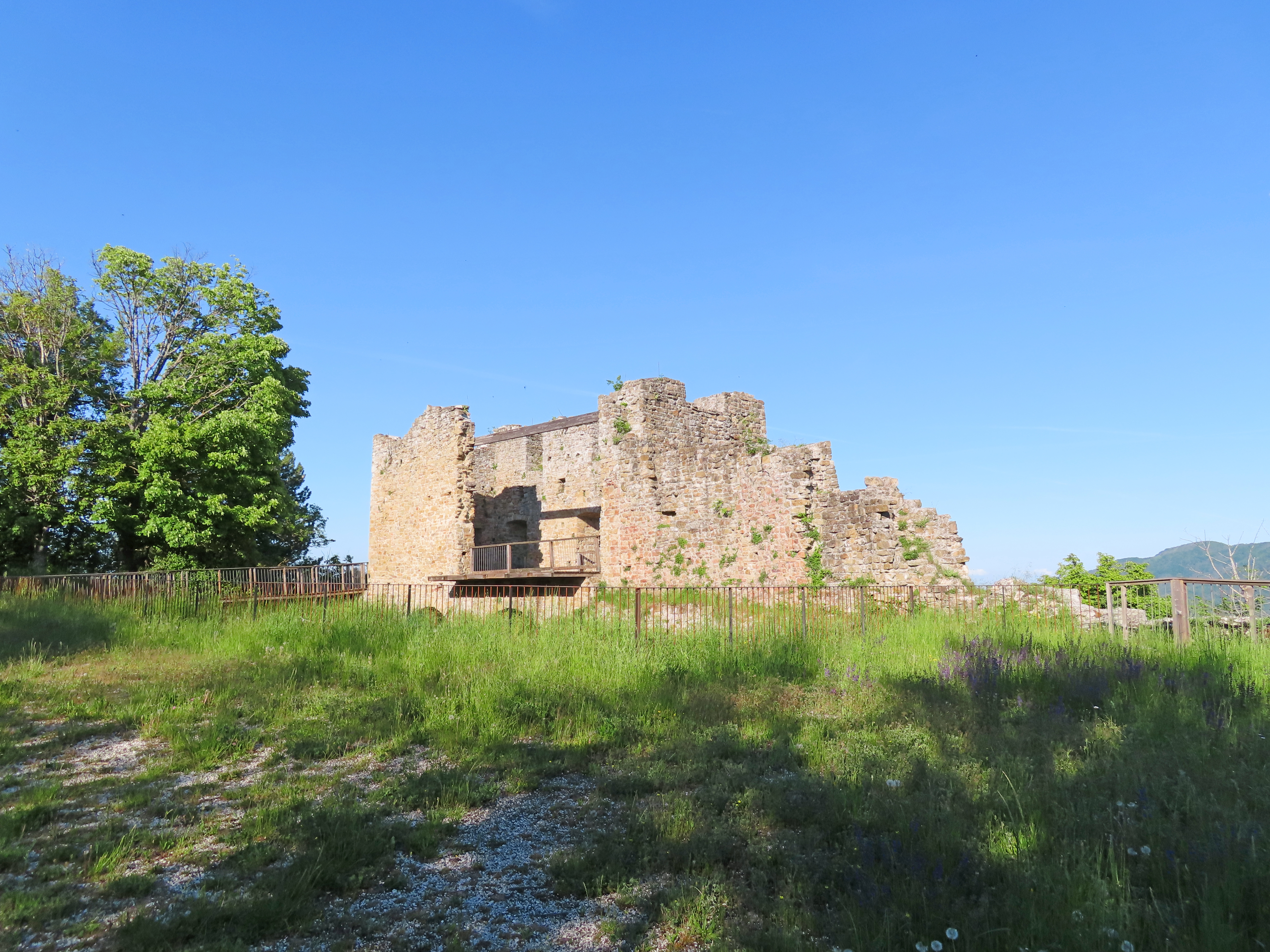
North-west side of the castle

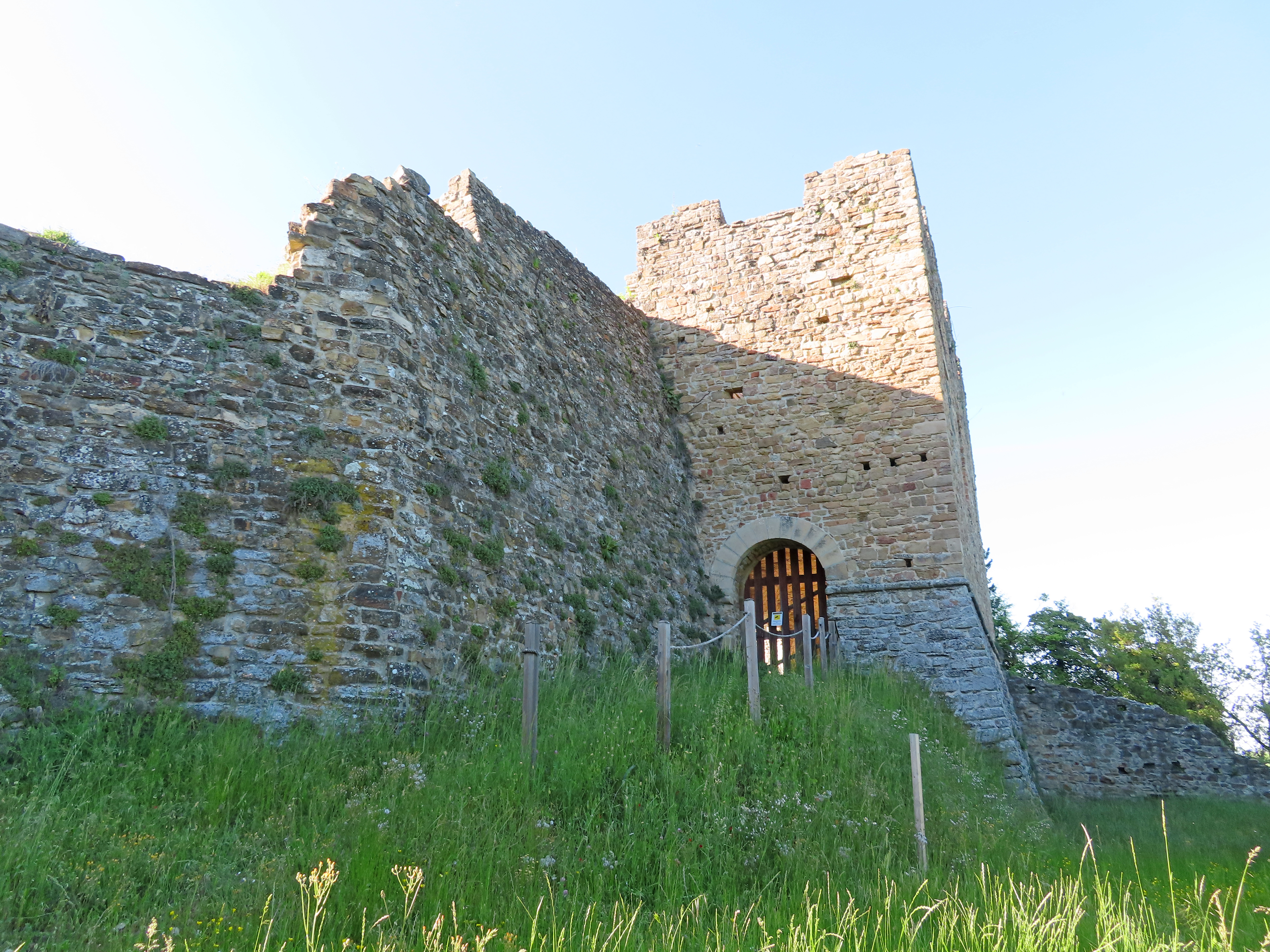
Tower of the castle

Probably built between the 10th and 11th centuries, the castle perhaps belonged to Giberto III da Correggio at the beginning of the 13th century. Granted in 1364, together with the Rocca di Belvedere, to the brothers Niccolò Terzi the Elder and Giberto, it was occupied by the Fieschi after the murder of Ottobuono de' Terzi in 1409. Later granted to Niccolò de' Terzi "the Warrior" by Filippo Maria Visconti, it was confiscated in 1449 by Francesco Sforza, who invested Pietro Ghirasio da Contrano with it; sold towards the end of the 15th century to Gianfrancesco I Pallavicino, it was bought by Duke Ottavio Farnese in the 16th century. Badly damaged by the cannon of Ferrante I Gonzaga during the War of Parma of 1551, it was granted in 1650 to Domenico Doria and, after the death of the last descendant, Maria Maddalena, at the end of the 18th century, to Troilo Ventura, until the abolition of feudal rights in 1806. Later bought by the Castiglioni, it largely collapsed in an earthquake in 1834. Bought by Ettore Ximenes in 1913 with the aim of restoring it to a design by the architect Lamberto Cusani, it was not rebuilt because of the outbreak of the First World War. Completely abandoned in 1930 and reduced to a ruin, it was bought by the municipality of Tizzano Val Parma in 1961; partly restored in 2002, in 2014 it became a venue for performances and cultural events. Of the castle, built entirely of stone, the perimeter walls, a truncated tower and a barrel-vaulted room on the ground floor survive, while the roofless upper level can be reached by walkways.

==== Rocca di Belvedere ====
Built at the beginning of the 15th century by Ottobuono de' Terzi, the castle of Rusino, also known as the Rocca di Belvedere, was taken in 1409 by Niccolò III d'Este, Marquis of Ferrara, followed in 1420 by Filippo Maria Visconti, Duke of Milan. Returned to the Terzi in 1441, it was stormed in 1551 by Camillo Rossi. Having lost its strategic role, it was later abandoned and reduced to a few ruins; only a truncated tower survives, structurally reinforced and cleared of debris at the beginning of the 20th century.

==== Torre dei Cadonici, Lagrimone ====
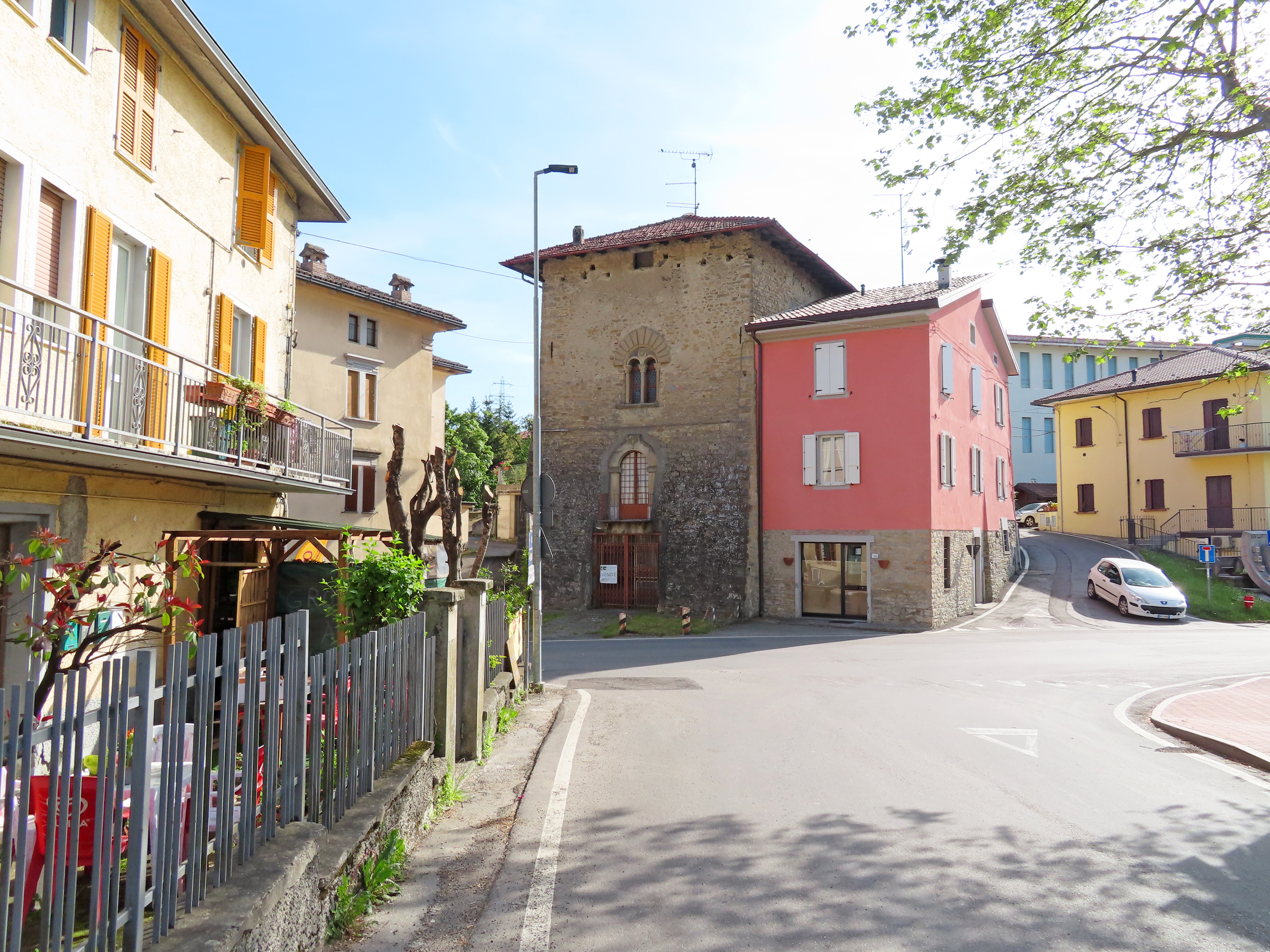
Torre dei Cadonici at Lagrimone

Built in the Middle Ages, the tower of Lagrimone, which belonged to Morello da Belvedere, was set on fire in 1509 by Jacopo di Maso. Later rebuilt, it was altered several times; bought by the Basetti family, around 1903 it was thoroughly renovated, including the façade, where several openings were made, among them a shop window on the ground floor, later used as a storeroom. The stone-faced fortified building stands on a high battered base. In the middle of the main front, above the wide opening of the storeroom, is a large French window with a small balcony, framed by an ancient round-arched entrance portal of carved sandstone from the bastia of Moragnano; on the upper level is a two-light window divided by three small columns and crowned by a rusticated arch, modelled on a window of the Basetti palace at Vairo.

== Culture ==
=== Fair of San Genesio at Albazzano ===
Recorded as early as 1309, the annual fair of Albazzano on 24 and 25 August, dedicated to Saint Genesius and to livestock, was regulated at the end of the 15th century by the count of Tizzano, Gianfrancesco I Pallavicino. Although it was banned by the acts of the synod presided over by Bishop Alessandro Sforza di Santa Fiora in 1564, it continued to be held, attracting people from the neighbouring states. Moved at the beginning of the 20th century from the locality of Madone to Chiastrella, it was later brought back to its original site; after some years of interruption it was revived in 1989, with music, games and tastings of local products.

=== Feast of San Matteo on Monte Caio ===
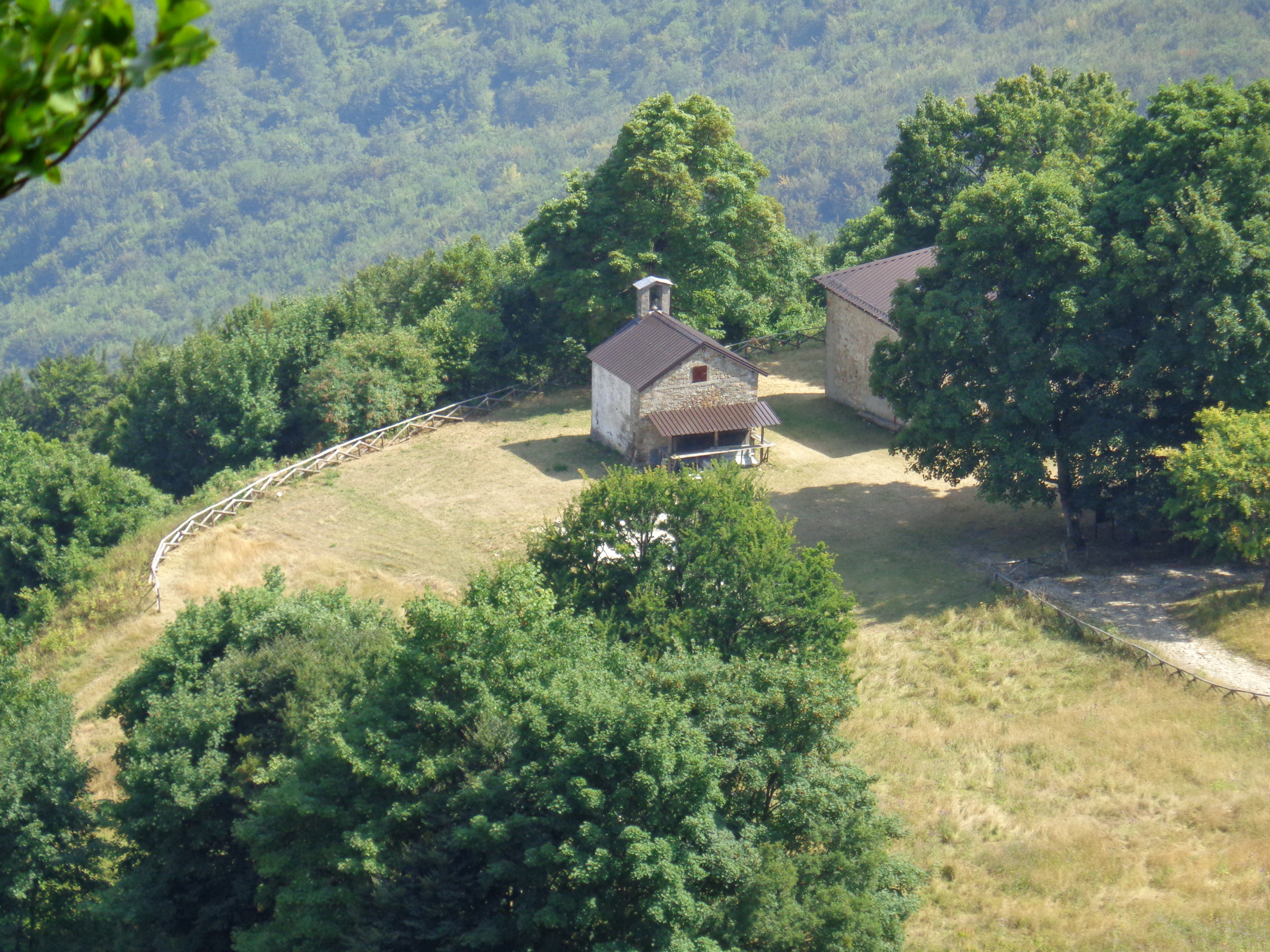
Hermitage of San Matteo

Dedicated to Saint Matthew, the traditional end-of-summer feast is held every year on 21 September at the hermitage of San Matteo, in the woods of Monte Caio at 1,344 m above sea level, which can be reached from Schia by several paths. The building, in the municipality of Palanzano and known in the Middle Ages as Monastero de Caliis, was first mentioned in a document of 1015 and again in the Capitulum seu Rotulus Decimarum of 1230 of the diocese of Parma, among the dependencies of the abbey of San Giovanni Evangelista, although it lay within the territory administered by the pieve of Tizzano. The feast, with a religious ceremony and a lunch with local products, draws people from the surrounding municipalities.

== Economy ==
The local economy is diversified. Agriculture is mainly represented by the breeding of cattle, pigs and poultry and by the cultivation of wheat and fodder. In the secondary sector the main industrial activities are food processing and construction. The tertiary sector is based mainly on services and on summer and winter tourism, which developed in the second half of the 20th century, above all in the main village and in the ski resort of Schia on Monte Caio.

== Government ==
Mayors since 1985
Mayor	Term start	Term end	Party
Luigi Depietri	3 July 1985	7 June 1990	Italian Democratic Socialist Party
Ugo Danni	12 June 1990	24 April 1995	PDS, PCI
Ugo Danni	24 April 1995	14 June 1999	centre-left
Gualtiero Ghirardi	14 June 1999	14 June 2004	centre-left civic list
Gualtiero Ghirardi	14 June 2004	8 June 2009	centre-left civic list, supported by the PD
Amilcare Bodria	8 June 2009	26 May 2014	centre-right civic list, supported by PdL
Amilcare Bodria	10 June 2014	27 May 2019	civic list Per Tizzano noi ci siamo, supported by Forza Italia
Amilcare Bodria	27 May 2019	10 June 2024	civic list Per Tizzano noi ci siamo, supported by Forza Italia
Isabella Rossi	10 June 2024	incumbent	civic list Futuro in Comune

== Bibliography ==
- Affò, Ireneo (1792). Storia della città di Parma (in Italian). Vol. I. Parma: Stamperia Carmignani.
- Angeli, Bonaventura (1591). La historia della città di Parma, et la descrittione del fiume Parma (in Italian). Parma: Erasmo Viotto.
- Bragazzi, Ugo, ed. (2022). Tizzano e il suo territorio dal XV al XX secolo (in Italian). Tizzano Val Parma.
- Capacchi, Guglielmo (1979). Castelli parmigiani (in Italian). Parma: Artegrafica Silva.
- Capacchi, Guglielmo (1993). Dizionario Italiano-Parmigiano (in Italian). Vol. II (M–Z). Parma: Artegrafica Silva. ISBN 978-8877650481.
- Chittolini, Giorgio (1972). Infeudazioni e politica feudale nel ducato visconteo-sforzesco (in Italian). Milan: il Mulino.
- Cirillo, Giuseppe; Godi, Giovanni (1986). Guida artistica del Parmense (in Italian). Vol. II. Parma: Artegrafica Silva.
- Cont, Paolo (2019). I Terzi di Parma, Sissa e Fermo (in Italian) (2nd ed.). Parma: Deputazione di Storia Patria per le Province Parmensi. ISBN 978-88-941135-5-6.
- Dall'Aglio, Italo (1966). La Diocesi di Parma (in Italian). Vol. I–II. Parma: Scuola Tipografica Benedettina.
- Dall'Olio, Enrico (1975). Itinerari turistici della provincia di Parma (in Italian). Vol. I. Parma: Artegrafica Silva.
- Fallini, Marco; Calidoni, Mario; Rapetti, Caterina; Ughetti, Luigi (2006). Terra di pievi (in Italian). Parma: MUP Editore. ISBN 88-7847-021-X.
- Gasca Queirazza, Giuliano; Marcato, Carla; Pellegrini, Giovan Battista; Petracco Sicardi, Giulia, eds. (1996). Dizionario di toponomastica (in Italian). Milan: Garzanti. ISBN 9788811305002.
- Molossi, Lorenzo (1832–1834). Vocabolario topografico dei Ducati di Parma, Piacenza e Guastalla (in Italian). Parma: Tipografia Ducale.
- Passarelli, Pasquale, ed. (2001). Emilia-Romagna. Comuni d'Italia (in Italian). Vol. 6. Acquaviva d'Isernia: Istituto Enciclopedico Italiano. ISBN 9788887983081.
- Pezzana, Angelo (1837–1859). Storia della città di Parma continuata (in Italian). Vol. I (1837), II (1842), V (1859). Parma: Ducale Tipografia.
- Relazione di inquadramento archeologico con schede di sito e segnalazioni (PDF) (Report) (in Italian). Tizzano Val Parma: Comune di Tizzano Val Parma. July 2013. Archived from the original (PDF) on 15 July 2021.
- Tiraboschi, Girolamo (1825). Dizionario topografico-storico degli stati estensi (in Italian). Vol. II. Modena: Tipografia Camerale.
- Vera, Domenico, ed. (2009). Storia di Parma (in Italian). Vol. II: Parma romana. Parma: Monte Università Parma. ISBN 978-88-7847-293-8.
