= Palanzano =

- Comune
- Comune di Palanzano
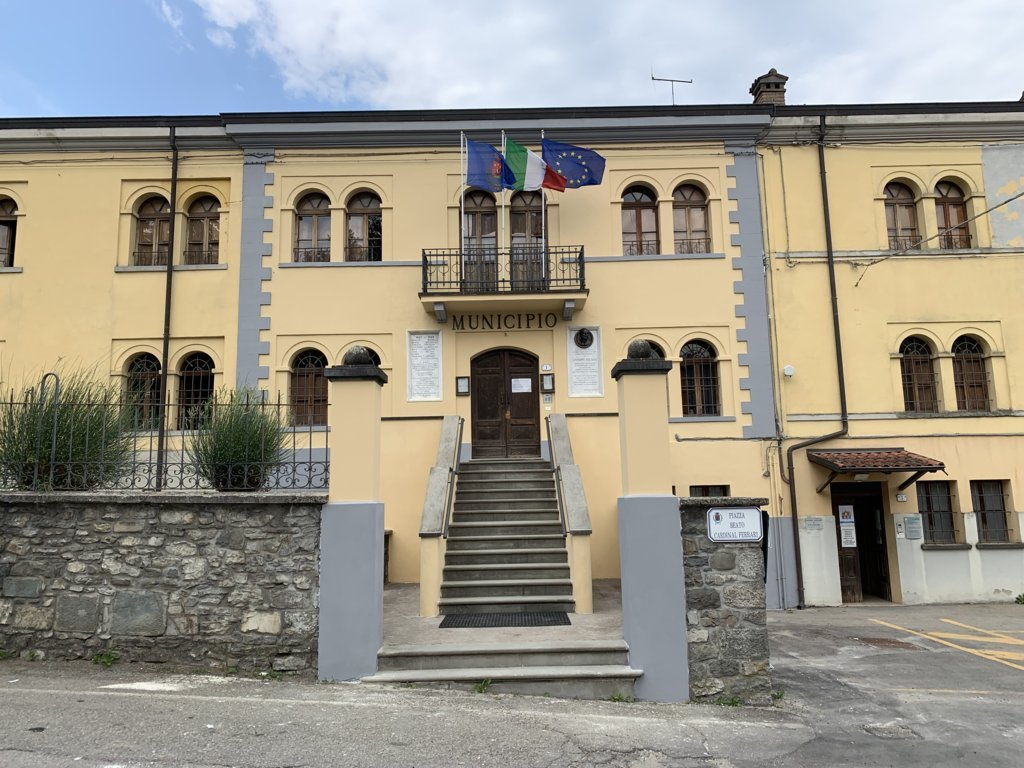
- Town hall

- Location within Italy Location within Emilia-Romagna
- Coordinates: 44°26′N 10°12′E
- Country: Italy
- Region: Emilia-Romagna
- Province: Parma (PR)
- Frazioni: Caneto, Case Ferrarini, Celso, Isola, Lalatta, Nirone, Palazzo, Pignone, Pratopiano, Ranzano, Ruzzano, Selvanizza, Sommo Groppo, Trevignano, Vaestano, Vairo Inferiore, Vairo Superiore, Valcieca, Zibana

Area
  - Total: 70.4 km^{2} (27.2 sq mi)
- Elevation: 691 m (2,267 ft)

Population (31 December 2017)
  - Total: 1,123
  - Density: 16.0/km^{2} (41.3/sq mi)
- Demonym: Palanzanesi
- Time zone: UTC+1 (CET)
  - Summer (DST): UTC+2 (CEST)
- Postal code: 43025
- Dialing code: 0521
- Website: Official website

Palanzano (Parmigiano: Palansàn) is a comune (municipality) in the Province of Parma in the Italian region Emilia-Romagna, located about 90 kilometres (56 mi) west of Bologna and about 40 kilometres (25 mi) south of Parma. Palanzano borders the following municipalities: Corniglio, Monchio delle Corti, Neviano degli Arduini, Tizzano Val Parma, Ventasso, Vetto.
