= Corniglio =

- Comune
- Comune di Corniglio
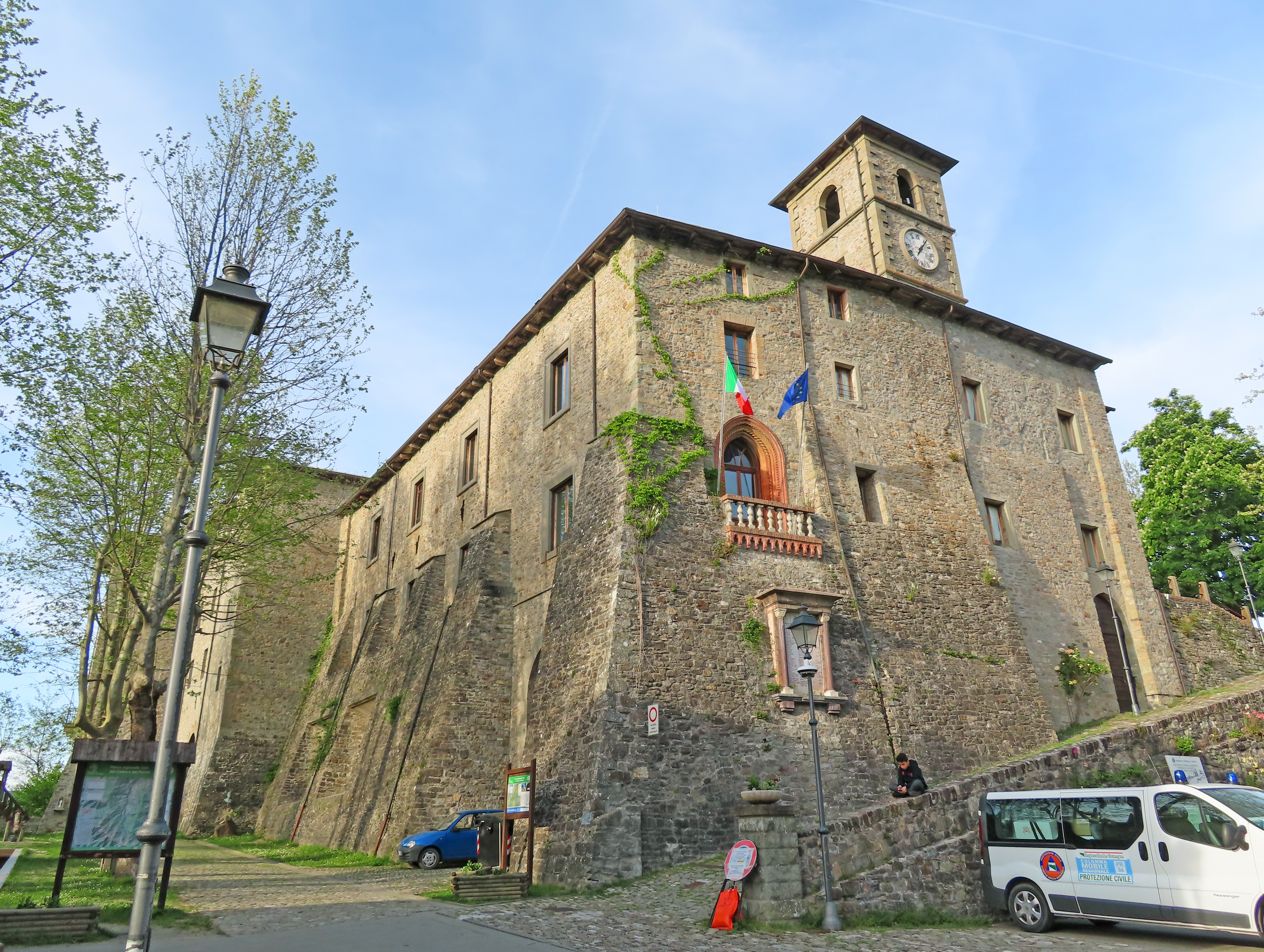
- Castle of Corniglio.

- Location within Italy Location within Emilia-Romagna
- Coordinates: 44°29′N 10°5′E
- Country: Italy
- Region: Emilia-Romagna
- Province: Parma (PR)
- Frazioni: Agna, Ballone, Beduzzo, Bellasola, Bosco, Bosco-Centrale, Braia, Ca'Pussini, Canetolo, Casa Martane, Case Pellinghelli, Centrale Idroelettrica, Cirone, Costa, Costa Venturina, Costalbocco, Curatico, Curatico San Rocco, Favet, Grammatica, La Costa, La Villa, Lago, Marra, Miano, Migliarina, Moretta, Mossale, Mossale Inferiore, Mossale Superiore, Mulino Vecchio, Petrignacola di Sopra, Petrignacola di Sotto, Prella, Pugnetolo, Rivalba, Roccaferrara, Sauna, Sesta Inferiore, Sesta Superiore, Signatico, Sivizzo, Staiola, Torre, Tre Rii, Tufi, Vesta, Vestana Inferiore, Vestana Superiore, Vestola-Ghiare, Villula

Government
  - Mayor: Paolo Quagliaroli

Area
  - Total: 165.7 km^{2} (64.0 sq mi)
- Elevation: 690 m (2,260 ft)

Population (30 June 2017)
  - Total: 1,865
  - Density: 11.26/km^{2} (29.15/sq mi)
- Demonym: Cornigliesi
- Time zone: UTC+1 (CET)
  - Summer (DST): UTC+2 (CEST)
- Postal code: 43021
- Dialing code: 0521
- Website: Official website

Corniglio (Parmigiano: Cornì) is a comune (municipality) in the Province of Parma in the Italian region Emilia-Romagna, located about 100 kilometres (62 mi) west of Bologna and about 40 kilometres (25 mi) southwest of Parma.

Corniglio borders the following municipalities: Bagnone, Berceto, Calestano, Filattiera, Langhirano, Monchio delle Corti, Palanzano, Pontremoli, Tizzano Val Parma.

It is home to a castle known since 1240. It was built in sandstone by the Rossi family, who held it until the 16th century.

The presence of a church in the village of Corniglio is attested from the late Middle Ages; the building, remodeled in the 17th century, underwent further renovations in the following two centuries.

== See also ==
- Lake Pradaccio
