= Lake Pradaccio =

Lake in Emilia-Romagna, Italy

- Lago Pradaccio (Italian)
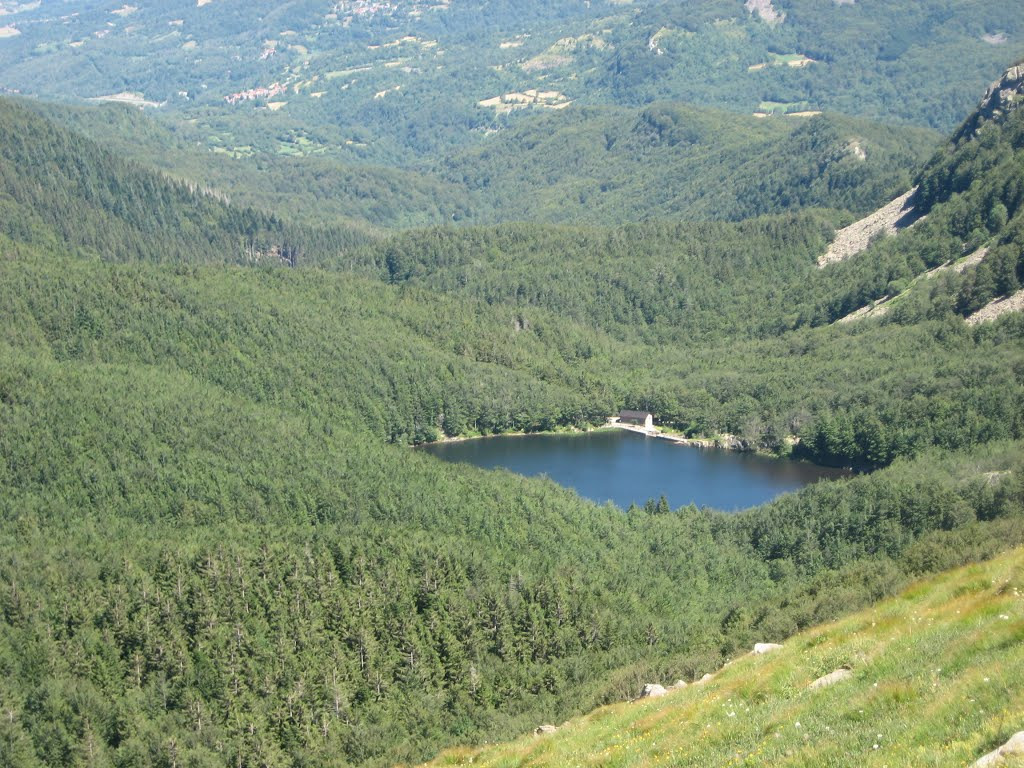
- Lake Pradaccio seen from the trail near the summit of Mount Aquila

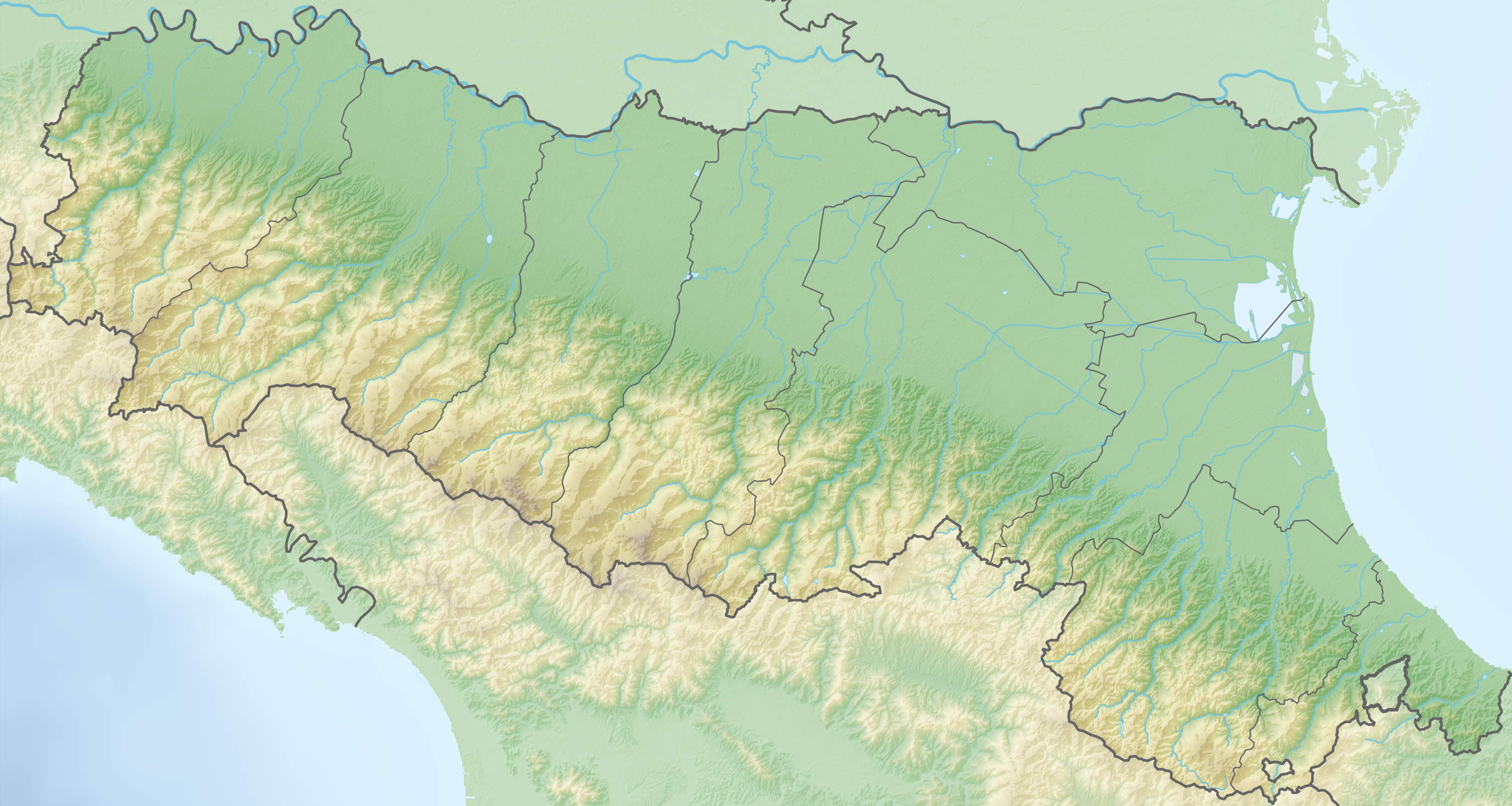
- Location within Emilia-Romagna
- Location: Emilia-Romagna, Parma, Italy
- Coordinates: 44°23′54″N 10°01′07″E
- Surface area: 0.040 km^{2} (0.015 sq mi)
- Max. depth: 2 m (6 ft 7 in)
- Surface elevation: 1,329 m (4,360 ft)

Lake Pradaccio is a partially natural lake of glacial origin located in the province of Parma, with a surface area of about 40,000 square meters and a maximum depth of 2 meters.

== Geography ==
The lake, located at an altitude of 1,370 meters in the municipality of Corniglio, is located in the western part of the Appennino Tosco-Emiliano National Park within the Guadine Pradaccio Nature Reserve. The name "Pradaccio" has its etymological roots in the term "Prataccio," which was historically used to refer to an ancient lake that is now present in the peat bog stage. The peat bog is also known as the "Prataccio peat bog" or the "Roccabiasca peat bog." The same appellation was subsequently ascribed to the lake that currently exists within the reserve. In 1959, the reservoir was constructed with the specific purpose of facilitating sport fishing. The lake covers an area of approximately 3 hectares. Its outflow is designated as the Parma delle Guadine torrent or the Parma di Francia. Collectively, the aforementioned system of torrents, which includes the Parma di Badignana and Parma del Lago Santo, constitutes the Parma torrent.

Of glacial origin, it is a semi-artificial reservoir, derived from hydraulic-forestry arrangements.

Lake Pradaccio is circular in shape and has a considerable surface area, making it the fourth largest lake in the Parma Apennines.

== Flora and fauna ==
The lake is home to the Italian crested newt (Triturus carnifex), the alpine newt (Triturus alpestris) and the common frog (Rana temporaria).

== Access to the lake ==
Since it is located in a protected area, the lake can only be visited by guided groups, with obligatory reservation at the Territorial Office for Biodiversity in Parma.

It is located in the territory of the municipality of Corniglio, about 8 km from Bosco di Corniglio, and can be reached either from the A15 highway, exiting at the Berceto tollbooth, or from the provincial road 13 from Langhirano.

== See also ==
- Santo Lake (Parma)
- Parma (river)
