= Giuseppe Micheli =

Giuseppe Micheli may refer to:

- Giuseppe Micheli (pentathlete)
- Giuseppe Micheli (politician)
