= Rusino =

Rusino Русино
- Selo
- Location within Vladimir Oblast Location within Russia
- Coordinates: 56°14′N 41°05′E
- Country: Russia
- Region: Vladimir Oblast
- District: Kovrovsky District
- Time zone: UTC+3:00

Rusino (Russian: Русино) is a rural locality (a selo) in Novoselskoye Rural Settlement, Kovrovsky District, Vladimir Oblast, Russia. The population was 13 as of 2010.

== Geography ==
Rusino is located 62 km southwest of Kovrov (the district's administrative centre) by road. Sazhino is the nearest rural locality.
