= Guido Torelli =

Count of Guastalla and Montechiarugolo, Italy,

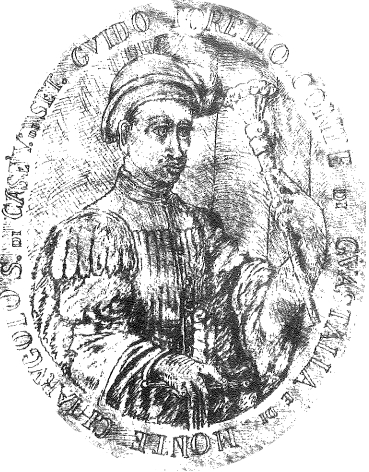
- Portrait of Guido Torelli.

Count of Guastalla and Montechiarugolo
- Tenure: October 3, 1406 - July 8, 1449
- Predecessor: Formerly a lord
- Successor: Cristoforo Torelli and Pietro Guido I Torelli
- Born: c. 1380; Mantua
- Died: July 8, 1449 (aged 68–69); Milan, Duchy of Milan
- Noble family: House of Torelli
- Spouse: Orsina Visconti
- Father: Marsilio Torelli

Guido Torelli (c. 1380 in Mantua - July 8, 1449, in Milan) was a condottiero. Through his military campaigns and diplomatic skills, he achieved the title of the first Count of Guastalla and Montechiarugolo.

Guido Torelli hailed from a family of condottieri who served the Gonzaga family of Mantua. An opportunist, he aligned himself with powerful lords like the Visconti to secure their favor. Despite participating in numerous battles, he lived to the age of 69, a remarkable feat. Engaged in all conflicts in Northern Italy, he even played a key role as an admiral in the liberation of Naples from Aragonese rule in 1424. Guido Torelli's relentless military exploits earned him lands, titles, and citizenships, establishing the influential Torelli family that held sway over Guastalla and Montechiarugolo until the 17th century.

== Background ==
In contrast to the large European monarchies, such as France or England, the Italian Peninsula was divided into numerous independent entities for many centuries. The late 14th and early 15th centuries saw Italy transition from commune governance to lordships. The title of potestate, initially a temporary office, was assumed by representatives of noble families like the Visconti in Milan, the Este in Ferrara, and the Scala in Verona. Titles and powers evolved from temporary to lifelong and eventually hereditary, leading to the establishment of dynasties. Lords extended their control over multiple cities, forming true states. In this setting, Guido Torelli embarked on the conquest of a fiefdom.

== Biography ==
Guido Torelli, born around 1380 (exact date uncertain), was the son of Marsilio Torelli and Elena, a descendant of the Counts of Arco. He received training in the art of war from a young age, excelling in this field and showing strong persuasive abilities. These qualities would develop and refine over time.

Guido came from a family with a proud military background that had served the Gonzaga family in Mantua for generations. However, his father, a devoted Ghibelline, brought him to the court of the Visconti.

=== Involvement with the Visconti ===
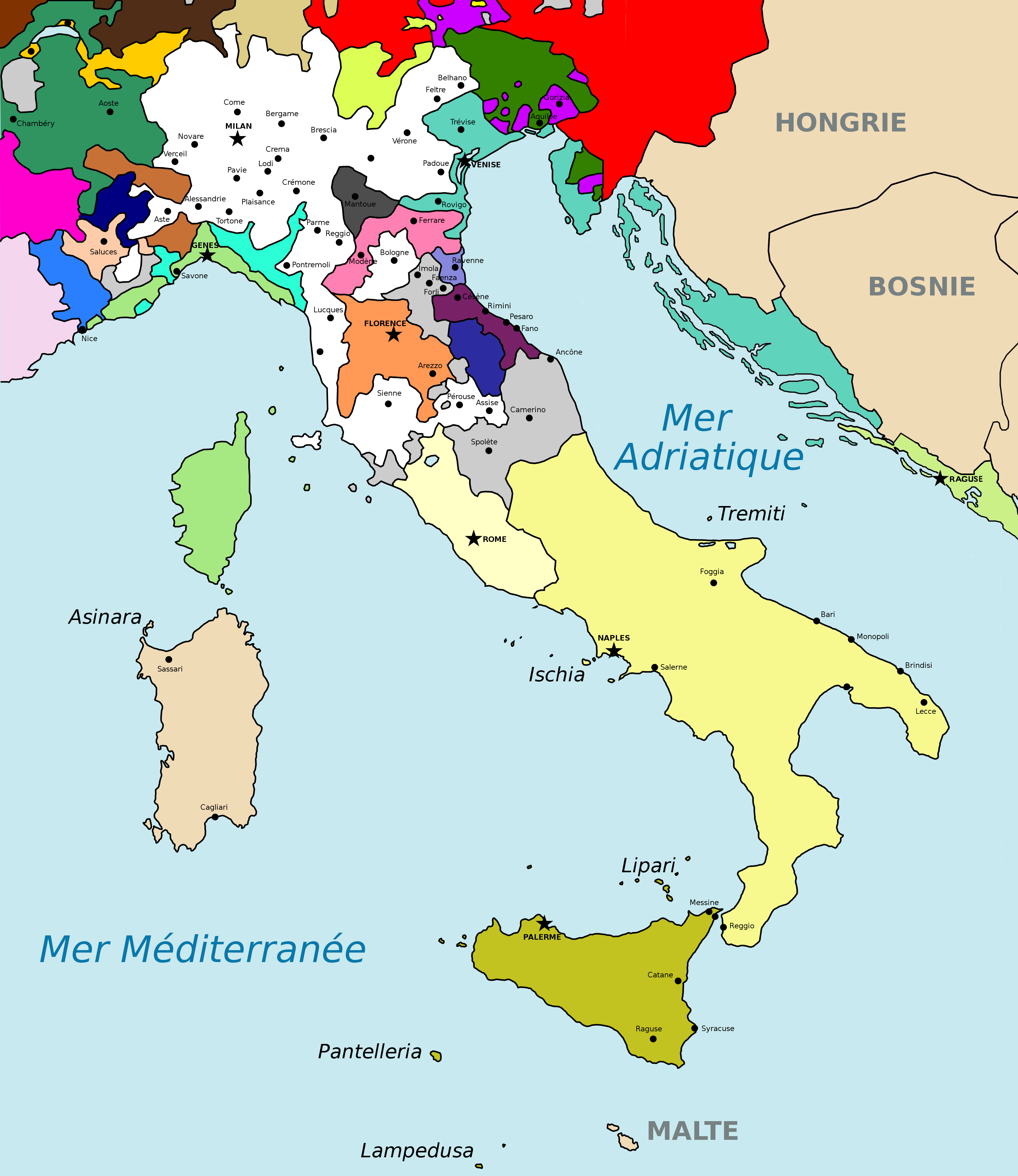
Archduchy of Austria County of Gorizia County of Nice County of Provence County of Savoy Duchy of Urbino Duchy of Milan Papal States March of Montferrat Marquisate of Saluzzo Patriarchate of Aquileia Prince-Bishopric of Chur Prince-Bishopric of Sion Prince-Bishopric of Trent Republic of Florence Republic of Genoa Republic of Venice Kingdom of France Kingdom of Naples Kingdom of Sicily Lordship of Ferrare Lordship of Lunigiana Lordship of Mantua Lordship of Ravenne Lordship of Rimini Other States

After the death of the Duke of Milan, Gian Galeazzo Visconti, in 1402, several lords in the Parmesan region rebelled against centralized rule. A complex web of alliances, often short-lived, formed among the Sanvitale, Rossi, Da Correggio, Terzi, and Pallavicino families. Guido demonstrated diplomatic prowess by aligning himself with the Visconti family, foreseeing the resolution of the crisis. He pledged allegiance to Ottobon Terzi, a Visconti contractor, who, in appreciation, appointed Guido as marshal (maniscalco) in 1405, granting him command of a small army.

He received lands from Ottobon near the castle of Montechiarugolo but was unable to prevent the plundering of Basilicagoiano (Note: Basilicagoiano remains a frazione of Montechiarugolo to current days.) and a significant portion of the Montechiarugolo territory by the Rossi family. The Montechiarugolo fortress was conquered in January 1404 but was later recaptured by Ottobon, thanks to its strategic location on the border with the neighboring state of Este.

In March 1404, Guido played a crucial role in the conquest of Parma by Ottobon, alongside Pietro Rossi. Gian Maria Visconti, in gratitude to Ottobon, appointed Guido as the lord of Parma. Guido seized this opportunity to oust Pietro Rossi and the Guelph party, reigniting the conflict, resulting in the massacre of 300 men. Ottobon, with Guido by his side, assembled 2,500 infantrymen at the castle of Montechiarugolo and launched an attack on Reggio Emilia, successfully capturing it. This victory granted Ottobon control over Parma, Piacenza, and Reggio. In January 1405, Guido, along with Visconti and Venetian forces, joined forces with Francesco I Gonzaga in the siege of Verona, then under the rule of Jacopo I da Carrara. Guido was captured but was swiftly released as the populace revolted against their lord. By March 1405, Guido seized the castle of Porporano with artillery, 300 cavalry, and 700 infantry. Leading a force of 4,000 men, he conquered Mamiano and the fortresses of Lesignano, San Michele di Tiorre, and Castrignano. The military operations were only halted by the snowfall.

Guido received houses and properties in Parma from Ottobon. On October 3, 1406, Ottobon recommended him to Gian Maria Visconti, who then rewarded Guido with the investiture of the fiefs of Montechiarugolo and Guastalla. Additionally, Guido received Monticelli, Montorano, Marano, Tortiano, Basilicagoiano, Pegorale, and Lesignano de' Bagni. The privileges granted to him allowed Guido to administer justice, appoint officers such as podestà, castellan, procurator, etc., as long as they did not oppose Milan. He also had the authority to collect taxes and was exempt from city jurisdiction. These powers were granted to him temporarily, and he was required to report directly to Milan. Guido married Orsina Visconti, who was a cousin of Gian Maria Visconti.

=== Submission to Niccolò III d'Este ===
In 1407, Guido was appointed governor of Reggio and engaged in battles against Niccolò III d'Este's troops, causing devastation in Scandiano and Sesso. Ottobon's actions grew increasingly ruthless, leading to the execution of 65 Parma residents suspected of treason and the plundering of Piacenza, despite being its lord, until Milanese troops intervened to free the city from his tyranny. Ottobon was assassinated by Giacomo Attendolo, founder of the Sforza dynasty, during peace negotiations in Rubiera on May 27, 1409, due to his widespread hatred. Guido was briefly imprisoned in Modena but was released in exchange for his father, wife, and son becoming hostages of Niccolò III in Mantua. Guido then collaborated with Este, conquering the castle of Pariano (Note: The castle of Pariano is located in Basilicanova in the frazione of Montechiarugolo.) to cut off aid to the defenders of San Polo d'Enza. He defended Montechiarugolo against Ottobon's sons and helped secure Parma's allegiance to Niccolò III until 1420. Guido also conquered Forlì at Niccolò III's request, returning it to the Ordelaffi family under the pope's directive.

The region enjoyed a period of peace, during which Guido seized the opportunity to fortify the castle of Montechiarugolo, a move deemed megalomaniacal by contemporary chroniclers. According to his descendant Pomponio, Guido conducted himself more like a "prince than a condottiere." He consolidated his territorial holdings, acquired lands in the Mantua region, expanded the Montechiarugolo fiefdom, and settled the issue of succession with his brothers. In 1416, Guido tragically lost his beloved son Pietro during the siege of Carpi.

=== Reconciliation with the Visconti ===
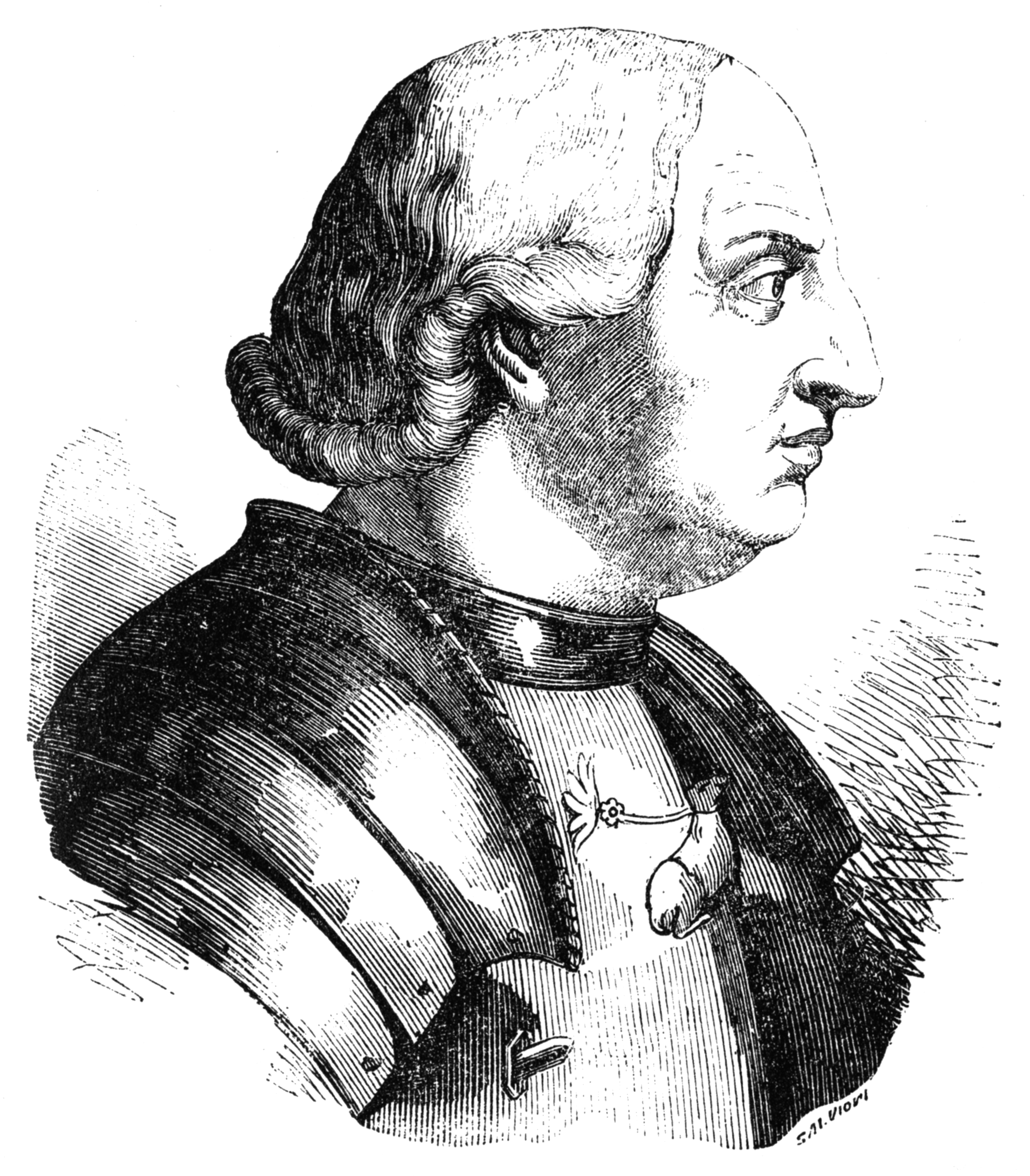
Francesco Sforza.

During these years, negotiations took place between the Visconti and the Este families for the possession of Parma. Guido chose to support the most powerful contender, and in 1417, the reconciliation was sealed by a perpetual reward granted by Filippo Maria Visconti. He was appointed as an ambassador to Florence. In 1420, he openly rebelled against the Este family and fought against them with Orlando Pallavicino. Around twenty local men attempted to capture the castle of Marano, which Guido had held since 1406, but were repelled by the local podestà, Guglielmo Appiano. The consequences of this rebellion remain unknown to this day.

On October 8, 1420, Guido participated in the battle of Montichiari under the command of Francesco Bussone da Carmagnola, which allowed the Visconti to retake Brescia. In 1422, he governed Genoa with three ducal advisors after the conquest of the city, then he was replaced by Carmagnola. During this period, the question of the succession of Queen Joanna II of Naples led to a war between Louis II of Anjou, named heir by Pope Martin V, and Alfonso of Aragon, whom Joanna adopted before completely reversing the alliance. In December 1423, Guido was appointed admiral and set sail to take part in the liberation of Naples from the Aragonese occupation with twelve ships and twenty-five galleys. Carmagnola, deprived of his post, forbade his men from embarking with Guido. Guido conquered Gaeta, and Naples was liberated on April 12, 1424. On this occasion, Joanna II presented him with the azure rampant lion, symbol of courage featured on the Torelli coat of arms and found on the pediment of the Montechiarugolo castle. Filippo Maria appointed him General Prefect of the maritime class. During this campaign, he met Francesco Sforza, son of Jacopo Attendolo and future Duke of Milan, whose military acumen he appreciated. The two men quickly reunited in Milan, with Sforza joining the service of the Visconti. This was followed by a period of calm which Guido used to reinforce the defensive system of Guastalla before Filippo Maria sent him to fight in Cremona as commander of the Visconti forces. On October 9, 1425, he defeated the enemy at Anghiari and then at Faggiuola.

In 1426, amidst ongoing war, the Venetians formed an alliance with the Florentines, the Estes, and the Montferrat to invade the County of Guastalla. This forced Guido's wife, Orsina Visconti, to defend the region. The Milanese suffered a defeat in 1427 at the hands of Francesco Bussone in the battle of Maclodio, resulting in the peace of Ferrara. Guido and his son Cristoforo, who was just eighteen at the time, fought in the Brescia region during this period.

=== Recognition by the Visconti ===
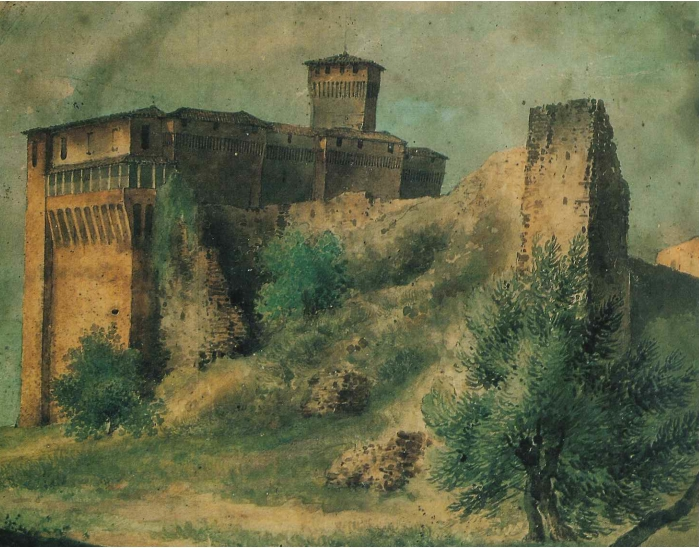
Montechiarugolo Castle in a watercolor from 1848.

On July 6, 1428, Filippo Maria Visconti once again rewarded Guido Torelli by definitively elevating the two fiefs to the rank of county. Montechiarugolo was separated from Parma, and Guastalla was detached from Cremona. The ceremony took place in the ducal Sforza's castle at Porta Giovia. Through an act of the ducal secretary Gianfranco Gallina confirmed by a ducal letter dated January 26, 1432, Torelli enjoyed extensive privileges and was exempted from duties and taxes. These privileges granted him almost sovereignty, but he swore never to disobey or fail in obedience and service to the Duke of Milan. He was authorized to display the Visconti emblem, the rampant serpent, on the pediment of the Montechiarugolo castle. Torelli also requested and obtained a clause allowing him not to engage in conflict with the Gonzaga family due to their longstanding attachment.

The Visconti aimed to maintain a balance between the urban and the countryside nobility to ensure control over the entire region. The lords were required to seek authorization from their duke for any construction projects. The tension between these two groups persisted, leading Filippo Maria to issue the decree De maiori Magistratu on November 7, 1441. This decree limited the power of rural lords by prohibiting them from demanding oaths of fidelity from their subjects and stipulating that disputes would be resolved by the major magistrate. In the same year, Filippo Maria's children, Cristoforo and Antonia, married into influential families. Cristoforo married Taddea Pio of the Signoria of Carpi; while Antonia married Pier Maria Rossi, a family that had previously been hostile to the Torelli.

After a brief period of peace, the war resumed between the Florentines, allied with the Venetians, and the Milanese, who emerged victorious. Guido obtained new territories such as Casei Gerola and Cornale on May 19, 1431. In 1432, he was appointed as the ducal lieutenant of the Valtellina and Val Camonica to oppose Swiss invasions. He also had to defend Bergamo and Brescia from the Venetians.

In 1441, he received prestigious recognition from Milan, Parma, and Pavia for himself and his descendants: honorary citizenship and lands acquired from Filippo Maria near Pavia (Settimo and Villareggio) with an area equivalent to that of Montechiarugolo and Guastalla. As a consequence, he permanently resided in Milan.

=== Counties ===
==== Guastalla ====
Guastalla was a strategic location, serving as a hub for both land and water communication routes. Situated in the plain of the Po River, it is located near the right bank of the Po, approximately 30 km from Reggio Emilia, Parma, and Mantua. The city has been highly sought after by various powers, including the Republic of Venice, the Gonzaga of Mantua, the Este of Ferrara, and the Visconti of Milan, who controlled it from 1346 to 1402.

==== Montechiarugolo ====
The county of Montechiarugolo was significant because the Enza River acts as a natural border with the neighboring state of Este. In Guido's frequent absence, the chief towns were governed by podestas. For instance, in 1438, a certain Leporati was present in Montechiarugolo.

The Enza River nourishes the canals, offering plentiful fishing opportunities. In certain areas, its banks were used as pastures for sheep and support cultivable islands. The river's wood was utilized for heating, and its pebbles were essential for constructing homes. Brother Flaminio da Parma, in his historical memoirs, described the area's richness, including fishing spots, pastures, vegetable gardens, and forests inhabited by various wildlife such as wolves, foxes, hares, deer, roe deer, and wild boars.

The water from the river and the Spelta Canal is essential for irrigation and the operation of mills, which Guardasone, a neighboring castle, tries to appropriate. The disputes, which span from 1420 to 1604, are subject to judgments by the magistrates of Parma. The disagreements also involve the neighboring village of Montecchio, which was then under the control of the Este family.

=== Final years ===
With the death of Filippo Maria Visconti in 1447, a succession dispute began. Contenders included Venice, the Duke of Orléans Charles I, and Francesco Sforza, who was married to Filippo Maria's only natural daughter, Blanche Marie. The Ambrosian Republic was established by Milanese nobles such as Giorgio Lampugnani, Antonio Trivulzio, Teodoro Bossi, and others, with the support of most condottieri, including Guido Torelli. Sforza, unable to fight both the Republic and Venice simultaneously, took command of Milanese troops against the Venetians. Concerned about Sforza's expansionism, the Republic formed an alliance with Venice. Sforza then laid siege to Milan, which eventually surrendered, and he became its ruler on February 27, 1450.

Guido, now elderly, has formed an alliance with the Ambrosian Republic on the condition that it protects the castle of Montechiarugolo. Meanwhile, his son Cristoforo has allied with his brother-in-law Pier Maria Rossi and entered the service of Sforza. This strategic move ensures that regardless of the outcome, the fief of Montechiarugolo remains protected. In a privilege dated May 8, 1449, Milan grants Guido immunity to safeguard his property. Just a few months later, on July 8, 1449, Guido Torelli passes away, leaving behind a request for his two children, Cristoforo and Pietro Guido I, to succeed him. He is laid to rest in the church of San Francesco in Mantua as per his wishes.

== Descendants ==
Orsina Visconti bore Guido Torelli four children:

- Pietro, dead in Carpi on April 15, 1416,
- Cristoforo, dead in Montechiarugolo on March 6, 1460,
- Pietro Guido I, dead on April 18, 1460 or 146132,
- Antonia Torelli, dead in 1468, married to Pier Maria Rossi, 4th Count of San Secondo, Count of Berceto and Corniglio, Lord of Roccaferrara, Felino, Basilicanova, Pietra Balza, Torrechiara, and Roccabianca.

== Coat of arms ==
Quarterly: 1st and 4th: Visconti; 2nd and 3rd: Or, a lion azure crowned Or; overall azure, a bull rampant Or.

Nicolas Viton de Saint-Allais describes the Torelli coat of arms as follows: "The Torelli family had a shield divided into Or and sable with an eagle, and a field of gules with a rampant golden bull. From this field, the imperial eagle emerged, carrying on its chest, according to some sources, a small gules shield with the same golden bull, and according to others, a lively silver horse on a purpure field. After receiving the coats of arms from the Queen of Naples and the Dukes of Milan, Guido and his descendants incorporated these into their own arms."

To this day, the castle of Montechiarugolo displays the two emblems of the coat of arms on its main wall:

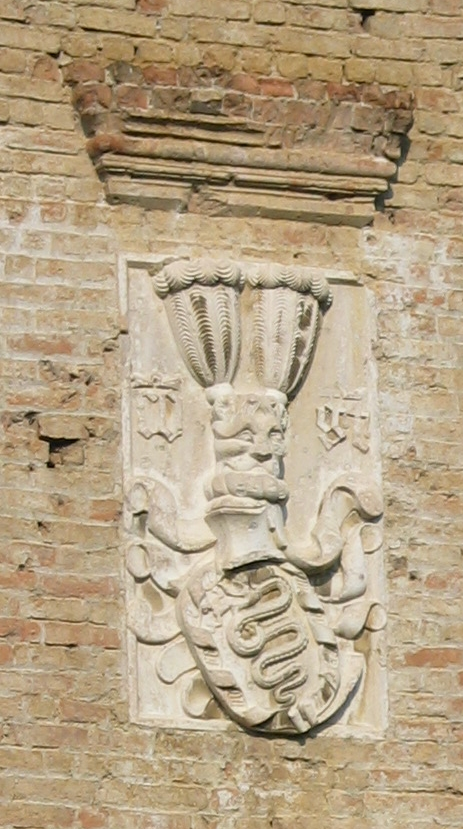
Arms of the Visconti family.

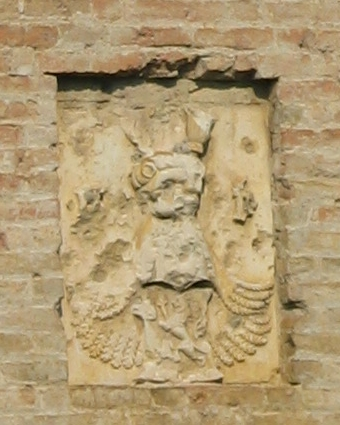
The lower part features the lion gifted by the Queen of Naples.

== Notes ==
- This article is partially or entirely based on the Italian Wikipedia article Guido Torelli.

== Bibliography ==
- Barbieri, Vittorio (1998). I Torelli (in Italian). Montecchio: l'Olmo.
- Fiorini, Franco (1993). All'ombra di un castello : Montechiarugolo attraverso i secoli (in Italian). Parma: Grafiche Step Editrice.
- Viton de Saint-Allais, Nicolas (1819). L'art de vérifier les dates des faits historiques (in French). Paris.
- Affò, Ireneo (1785). Istoria Della Citta, E Ducato Di Guastalla (in Italian). Vol. 1. Salvatore Costa e Comp.
