= Francesco Comelli =

Italian scientific instrument maker

Francesco Comelli (1744 in Parigi – 1816 in Bologna) was an Italian scientific instrument maker with considerable expertise in foundry and metalworking.

Comelli was a skilled craftsman who made machines, instruments, and clocks, and an innovator in the design of metal presses. In 1780 he was appointed "regulator" of the public clock in Bologna. A device designed by Comelli was used by Gianbattista Guglielmini in experiments to measure the rotation of the earth in 1791. Florence's Museo Galileo holds a specimen of an alidade for a clockmaker's lathe, made by Comelli.
