= Felino Castle =

Castle in Felino, Italy

- Felino, Emilia-Romagna, Italy
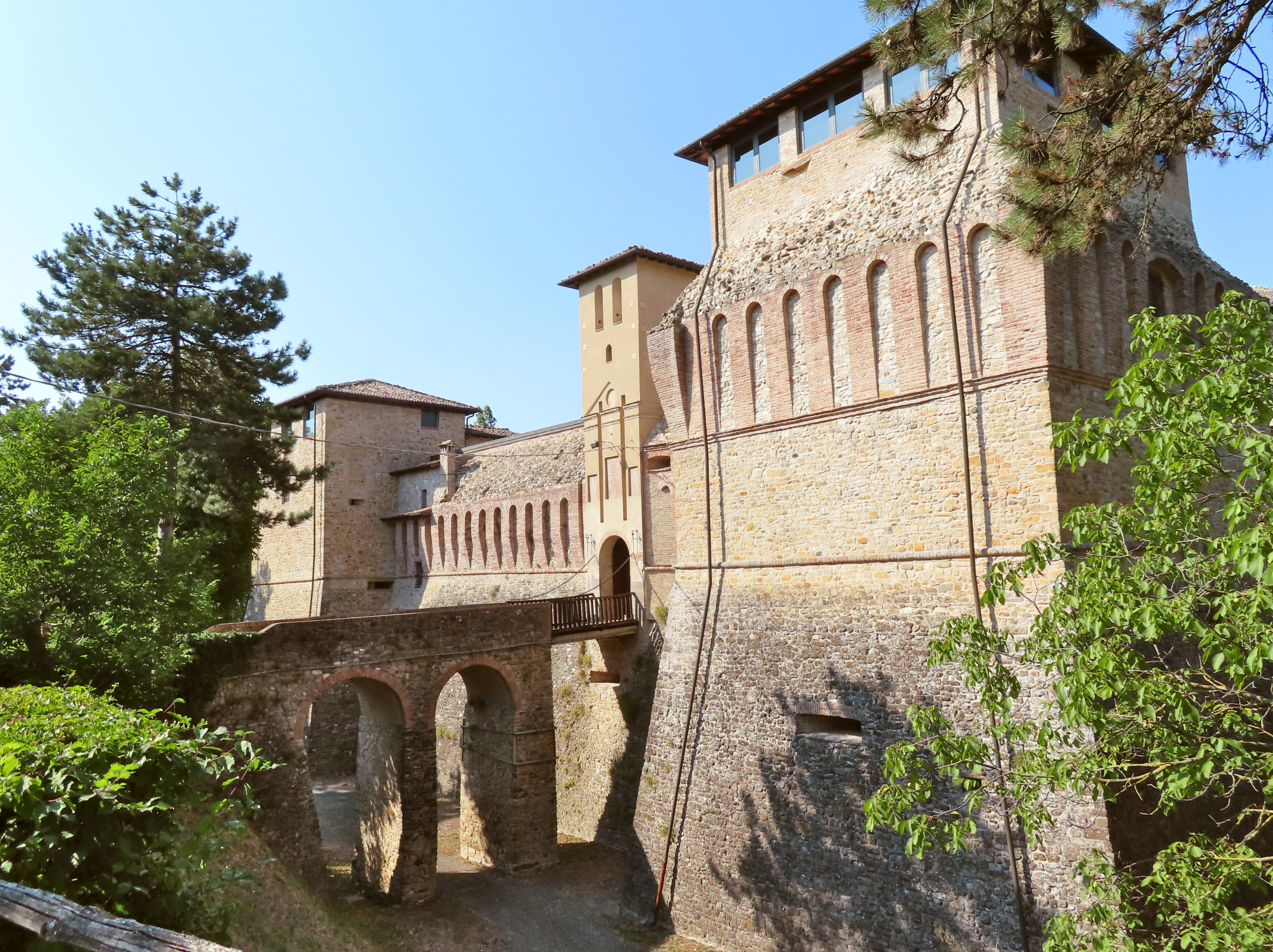
- Entrance facade and moat

Site information
- Type: Castle
- Owner: Alessandrini Family
- Open to the public: Yes
- Condition: Renovated

Location
- Coordinates: 44°41′02″N 10°14′12″E

Site history
- Built: 1140
- Materials: Stone and brick

The Castello di Felino or Felino Castle is a medieval manor house located on a hillside location at Al Castello Road 1 in Felino, in the province of Parma, region of Emilia Romagna, Italy; the building is home to a restaurant and the Felino salami museum.

== History ==
=== From the origins to the 13th century ===
Although the village of Felino had been founded before 948, the year in which King Lothair II of Italy granted Count Manfredo di Ugo of Parma the rights over the Curtis Filinum and fifteen others in the territory, (Note: The Curtis Felini named in the 870 diploma of Holy Roman Emperor Ludwig II the Younger, for a long time confused with Felino, is instead identifiable with Felina, near Bismantova, as is the court Felinis mentioned in 890 in the diploma confirming rights to Marquis Unrico, son of Suppone III, by King Berengar of Italy of Friuli.) the first certain news of the existence of a castrum in Felino date back to 1140, when Abbess Agnese of St. Alexander of Parma succeeded in having Pope Innocent II recognize the monastery's rights over the chapels of St. Peter and St. Christopher, placed one inside and the other outside the fortress. (Note: "que sunt posite in Felino una est posita in castro et alia de foris")

In 1186, at the end of the struggle between Frederick Barbarossa and the Italian Communes, the fiefdom of Felino, along with the lands of San Michele de' Gatti, Barbiano, Carignano, and Paderno, was awarded by the Emperor to Guido de' Ruggeri of Parma and his heirs, in gratitude for their loyalty.

=== 14th to 15th century ===
In 1325, the troops of the Lord of Milan Azzone Visconti, allied with the Pallavicino family, attacked the Parmense, sacking numerous villages, including Felino, which was set on fire; the castle, strenuously defended by Bonaccorso de' Ruggeri, was saved.

Emblem of the Rossi family

Thanks to a clever matrimonial policy carried out by the Rossi family, for two generations married the three descendants of the de' Ruggeri family, in 1346 the fiefdom and castle of Felino, with the lands of San Michele de' Gatti, Barbiano, Carignano, and Paderno, were bequeathed by Bonaccorso de' Ruggeri to his two sons-in-law Giacomo de' Rossi, Count of San Secondo, and Ugolino de' Rossi, the latter's cousin.

In the following years, Ugolino de' Rossi's two daughters married cousins Rolando and Bertrando, respectively Giacomo's son and grandson, whose branch thus succeeded in centralizing all the family properties scattered in the Parmense; Felino, in particular, became appurtenant to Bertrando, to whom in 1368 Rodolfo Visconti granted wide exemptions on the fief and its appurtenances, reconfirmed in 1387 by Gian Galeazzo Visconti. Beginning in that period Felino, thanks to the presence of a flourishing market, increased its importance, so much so that it became the most populous center of all the Rossi possessions, as well as, thanks to its location at the center of the domains of the lineage, for more than a century the seat of the lordly chancery.

Roland died in 1389 without male children, so all his property passed to Bertrando; he, in turn, disappeared perhaps in 1396, (Note: Although many sources report 1396 as the date of James's death, this date is probably incorrect, as the name of his son Roland and that of his grandson Bertrando always appear in deeds after 1375; confirming this, Rolando's lordship over San Secondo since 1374 is indicated on some sources, as well as it is reported that the subjects swore allegiance to James as early as 1368.) and all his property was inherited by his three legitimate sons Giacomo, bishop of Verona, who chose the castle of Felino as his residence until he died in 1418, Giovanni, who disappeared probably as early as 1402, and Pietro Maria I, who resided mainly in San Secondo building the Rossi fortress.

At the beginning of the 15th century, Parma was the scene of bitter struggles involving, in sometimes alternating alliances, all the major families of the territory. In anticipation of possible clashes, in 140,3, Giacomo and Pietro began to fortify all their castles, especially those of San Secondo and Felino, whose village, after an initial sacking at the hands of Giacomo dalla Croce and Bartolomeo Gonzaga, allies of the Terzi, was plundered and set on fire by the men of Gonzaga, Guido Torelli and Bonifacio da Valle. In May 1404, following Ottobuono de' Terzi's entry into Parma, Pietro de' Rossi fled to the castle of Felino; in response, after a short time Ottobuono sacked the Felino center and other lands of the Rossi family, then returned to attack the manor in August of the same year, but without success. Felino and other lands were again sacked by Terzi's men in 1405. In 1408, while attempting to defend the Grondola Castle in the Pontremolese, Pietro was imprisoned by Cardinal Ludovico Fieschi's troops; as soon as he was informed of this, Ottobuono took advantage of this to plunder Felino and other Rossian lands again. The following year, too, the Felino castle, defended by Giacomo, was attacked by the militia of the Terzi and the Fieschi, who devastated the village. The situation calmed down a few months later, with the killing of Ottobuono and the surrender of the Terzi, while the Marquis of Ferrara Niccolò III d'Este, an ally of the Rossi, became the new Lord of Parma.

In 1420, Guido Torelli, on behalf of the Duke of Milan Filippo Maria Visconti, with the help of the Pallavicino family, conquered Cavriago, plundered Parma and several villages in the Parmense region, and moved toward Reggio, forcing the Estense to give up Parma to keep Reggio; the Duke returned the lost family lands to Niccolò de' Terzi, the Warrior, and, to avoid further clashes, sent some armigers to occupy Felino.

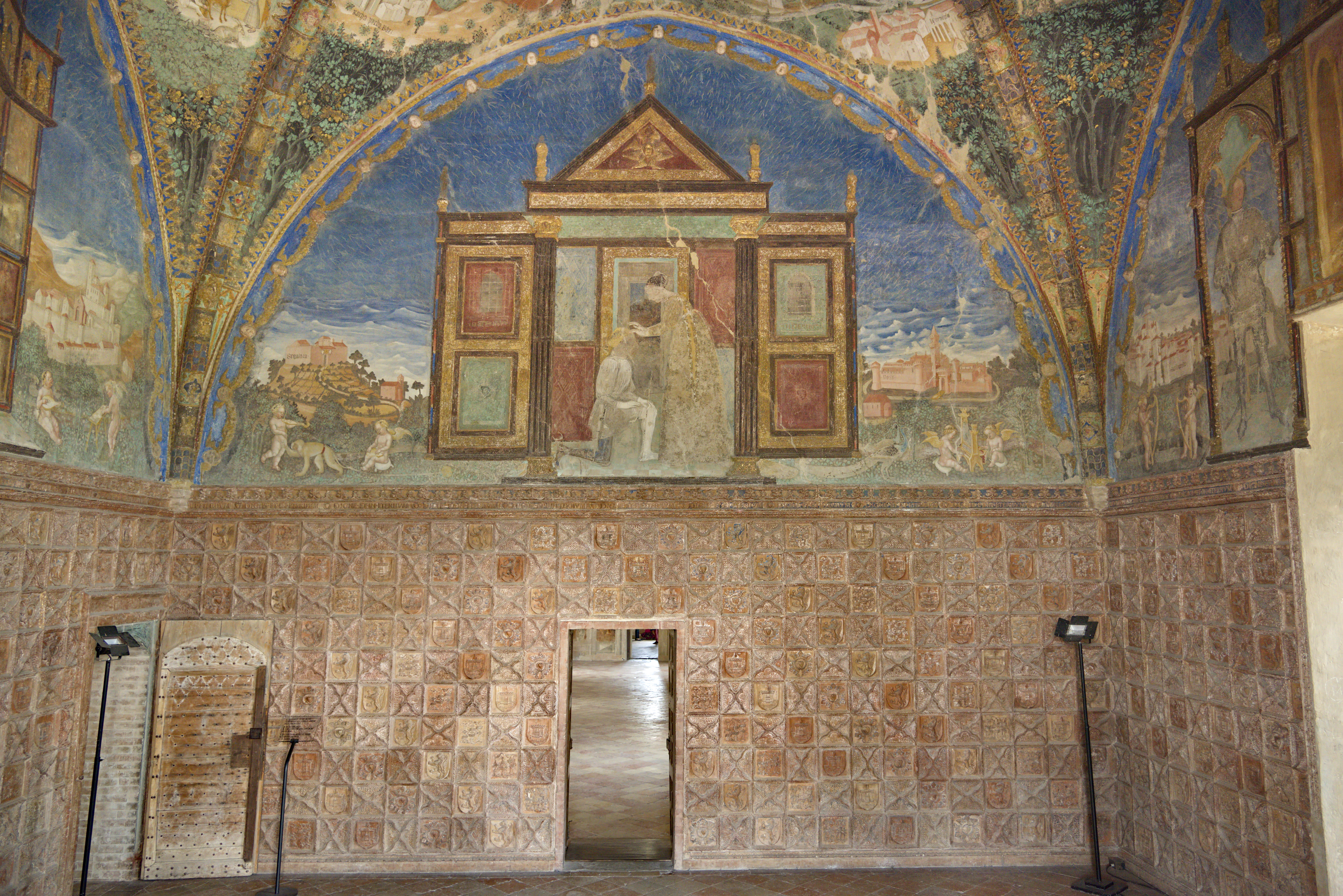
This is a photo of an Italian cultural property participating in the 2016 Wiki Loves Monuments competition.

Upon Peter's death in 1438, all of his property passed to his son Pier Maria II, who in the following decades greatly fortified many of his castles, including that of Felino, of fundamental importance because of its centrality in the Rossi domains; the manor probably took on its final configuration then, with a rectangular central courtyard, four massive towers in the corners and a perimeter moat surrounded by walls.

Between 1482 and 1483, following Ludovico il Moro's seizure of power in Milan, the Parmense region was convulsed by the War of the Rossi, which pitted the Sforza, Pallavicino, Sanvitale, and Fieschi against one side and the Rossi and Torelli, financed by the Republic of Venice, on the other. In May 1482, in response to a Rossi raid on the suburbs of Porta San Michele in Parma, a handful of Parmesans led by Zanone della Vella attacked and plundered the center of Felino. The following month, in reaction to a new incursion into the city by the men of Amuratte Torelli and Guido de' Rossi, son of Pier Maria, the village of Felino was devastated by the Sforza troops, who raided and plundered numerous buildings, but after four days were repulsed with a sortie from the castle.

On September 1, Pier Maria died, and the fiefdom of Felino, along with those of San Secondo, Bardone, Berceto, Neviano de' Rossi, and Noceto, as per his will of 1464 passed to Guido. After a short time, his brother Giovanni the "Dispossessed" attempted to seize the Felino fortification, but he was captured and imprisoned in the castle dungeons, from which he escaped during the night. His brother James then took command of the garrison, while Guido moved to San Secondo. In the following weeks, several castles fell into enemy hands, so much so that on October 1,2 Guido was induced to sign a peace with Ludovico il Moro, which would have allowed him to keep part of his lands, but lose San Secondo, Felino, and Torrechiara; however, on the one hand, Giacomo refused to abandon the castle and on the other hand the war continued with the Pallavicino, so even the fragile truce between Guido and Ludovico il Moro broke down in the following year. On May 7, Sforza pushed on to Felino with forty squads of armigers and encamped at the foot of the manor; after a few days of bombardment, the captains garrisoned surrendered and opened the gates to the Moor, who immediately had all the castle's fortifications demolished before moving on to Torrechiara. Guido fled first to Genova and later to Venice, while the bulk of the Rossi possessions were divided among the ducal chamber, the Sanvitale family, Gianfrancesco I Pallavicino, and Pietro Francesco Visconti di Saliceto, the important fiefs of Felino, Torrechiara and San Secondo were assigned to Leone Sforza, the youngest son of Ludovico il Moro, who became their administrator. Upon the young man's death in 1496, the three fiefs passed, for some time, to Duchess Beatrice d'Este, again by donation from her husband Ludovico.

=== 16th to 18th century ===
Following the conquest of the Duchy of Milan by the French in 1499, King Louis XII invested Troilo I de' Rossi, son of Giovanni the "disinherited," with the manors of San Secondo, Felino, and Torrechiara, but the count could only take possession of the former; some of the inhabitants of the two fiefs, loyal to Filippo Maria de' Rossi, son of Guido, opposed Troilo's entry, and the intervention of Gian Giacomo Trivulzio was necessary, who in September went to Felino and Torrechiara as royal lieutenant, intimating the castellans to hand over the fortresses to their rightful owner. However, in October, despite Troilus's protests, the king assigned Felino and Torrechiara to Marshal Pietro di Rohan, lord of Giè. The following year Philip Mary, allied with the Venetians and Ludovico il Moro, when the latter succeeded in repossessing Milan, easily occupied the two manors, taking advantage of the marshal's absence. However, after a short time, the French returned to Milan and Philip Mary fled to Mantua; Louis XII reassigned the castles of Felino and Torrechiara to Pietro di Rohan, who in 1502 alienated them for 15,000 scudi to Marquis Galeazzo I Pallavicino of Busseto.

Emblem of the Pallavicini family

In 1512, Filippo Maria planned to reconquer the fiefs of Felino, Torrechiara, and Basilicanova, but was forced to desist; the following year he attacked and conquered the Felino castle, but after only four days the Pallavicino managed to repossess it. It was probably during those years that the keep of the manor was rebuilt.

Emblem of the House of Sforza

In 1545, the Countess of Santa Fiora Costanza Farnese consented to the marriage between her son Sforza I Sforza and the Marquise Luisa Pallavicino, who brought as dowry, among others, the fiefs of Torrechiara and Felino.

In 1551, during the War of Parma that pitted the Duke of Parma Ottavio Farnese, supported by the King of France Henry II, against Pope Julius III, aided by the governor of Milan Ferrante I Gonzaga, an ally of the Holy Roman Emperor Charles V of Hapsburg, Gonzaga temporarily conquered the two Sforza manors.

In 1600, Cardinal Francesco Sforza alienated the fiefdom of Felino to Count Cosimo Masi; however, in 1612, his son Giovan Battista was arrested and executed, along with several other Parmesan nobles, on charges of participating in the alleged feudal conspiracy against the Duke of Parma Ranuccio I Farnese, who confiscated all their property.

In 1632, Odoardo I appointed General Girolamo Rho as count of Felino; upon his death in 1645, the Duke invested the rights over the fief and castle with Minister Giacomo Gaufridi, Marquis of Castelguelfo, who retained them until his death sentence decreed by Ranuccio II Farnese in 1650. The duke then elevated the Felino fief from county to marquisate and assigned it to the secretary of state Pier Giorgio Lampugnani; upon the death in 1762 of the last of the Lampugnani family, Camillo, Felino returned to the ducal chamber.

In 1763, Duke Philip of Bourbon ceded the property rights over the castle to the bishop's refectory of the diocese of Parma in exchange for the County of Mezzani, while the following year he assigned the feudal rights over the marquisate to the ducal prime minister Guillaume du Tillot, who retained them until he died in 1774; on February 7, 1775, the fief was then definitively absorbed by the Ducal Chamber.

=== 19th to 21st century ===
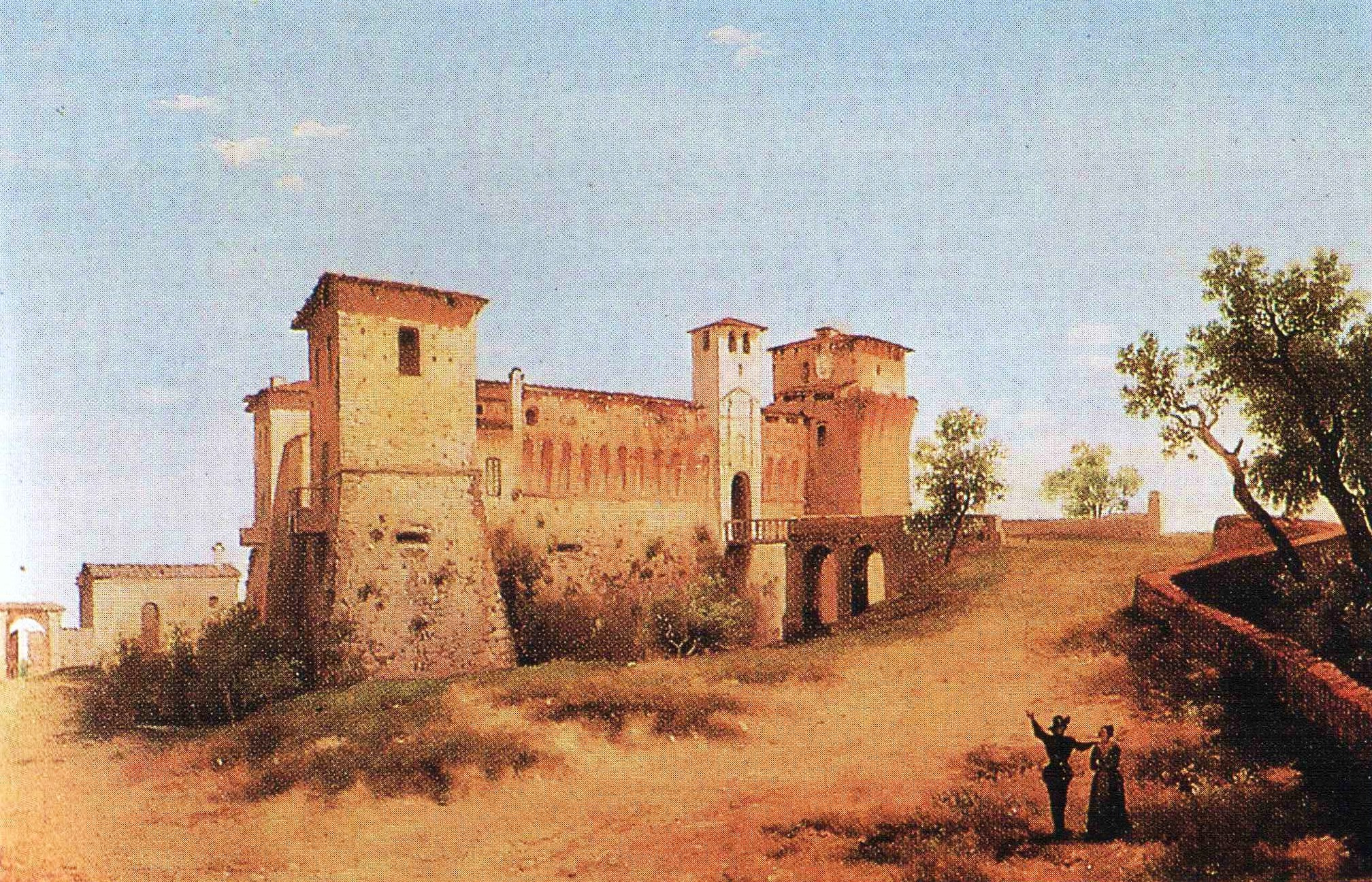
Alberto Pasini, The Felino Castle, 1849, Glauco Lombardi Museum

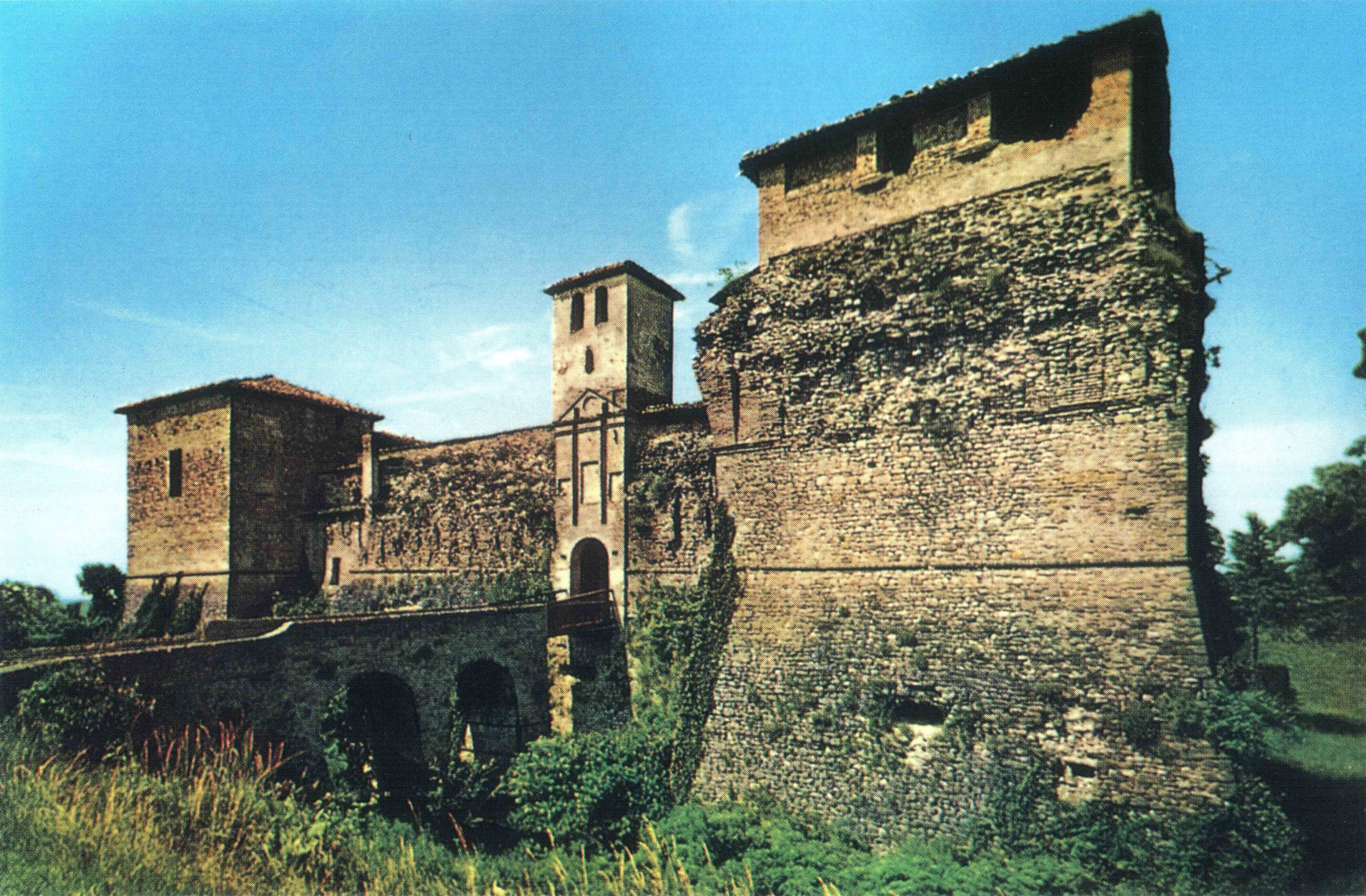
The main facade of the castle in a 1970s postcard

From the end of the 18th century, the castle became a vacation spot for the Parma episcopate; in particular, Bishop Francesco Pettorelli Lalatta chose it as his favorite vacation spot, refitting various rooms to make it more habitable. There followed, however, a slow period of decline and abandonment, so much so that the last bishop to stay there in the early 20th century, Francesco Magani, called it "a pile of ruins, a hotel of bats, owls, and mice."

In 1935, the Bishop's Canteen alienated the manor to the Brian family, which already owned a villa near the castle. In the 1960s, it was bought by the Pianzola family and the Del Bono Counts, who repurposed several parts to house a restaurant. In 197,4 it was finally sold to Sergio Alessandrini, father of the current owner, who subjected it to complex restoration work.

== Description ==
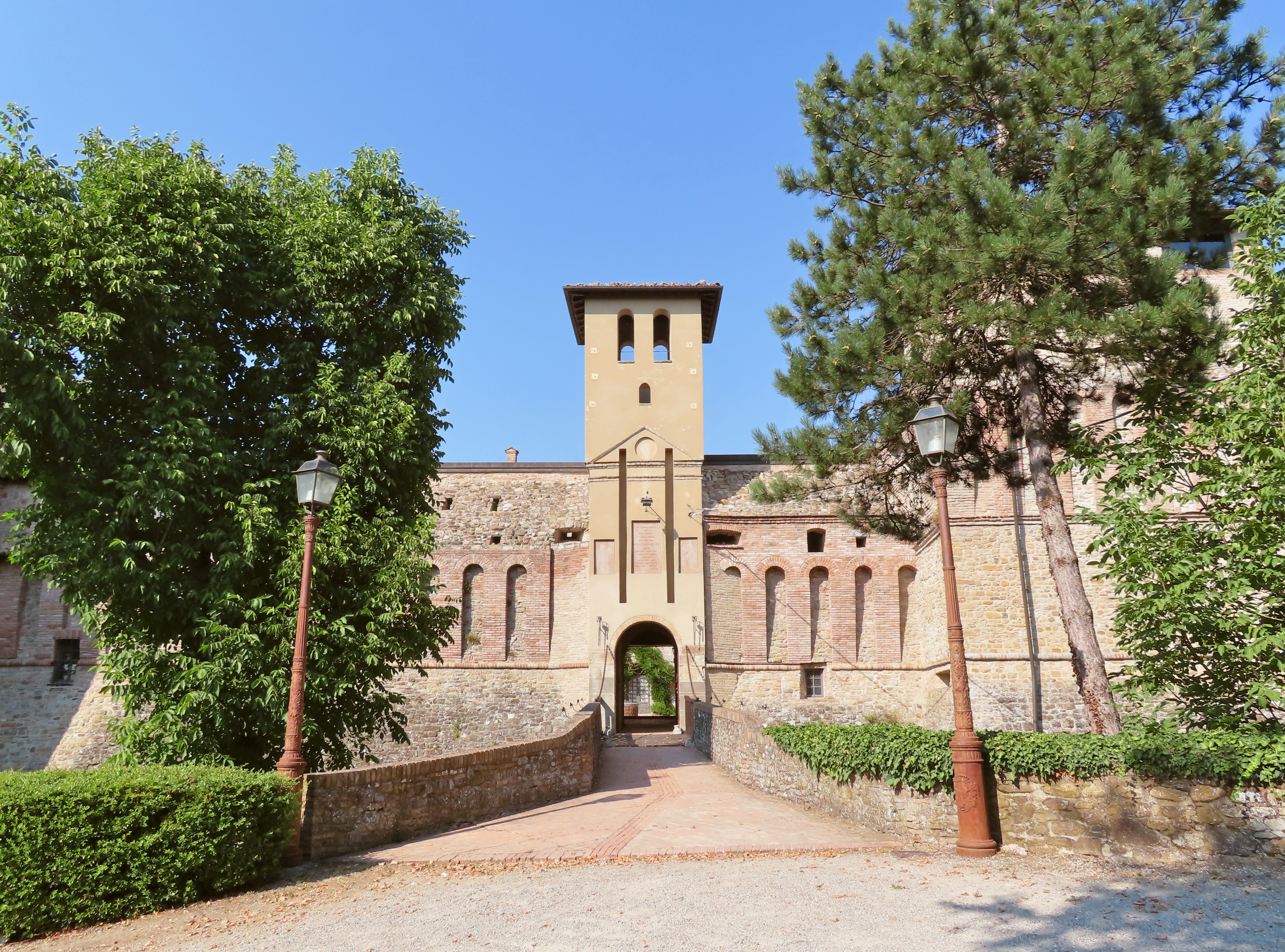
Facade

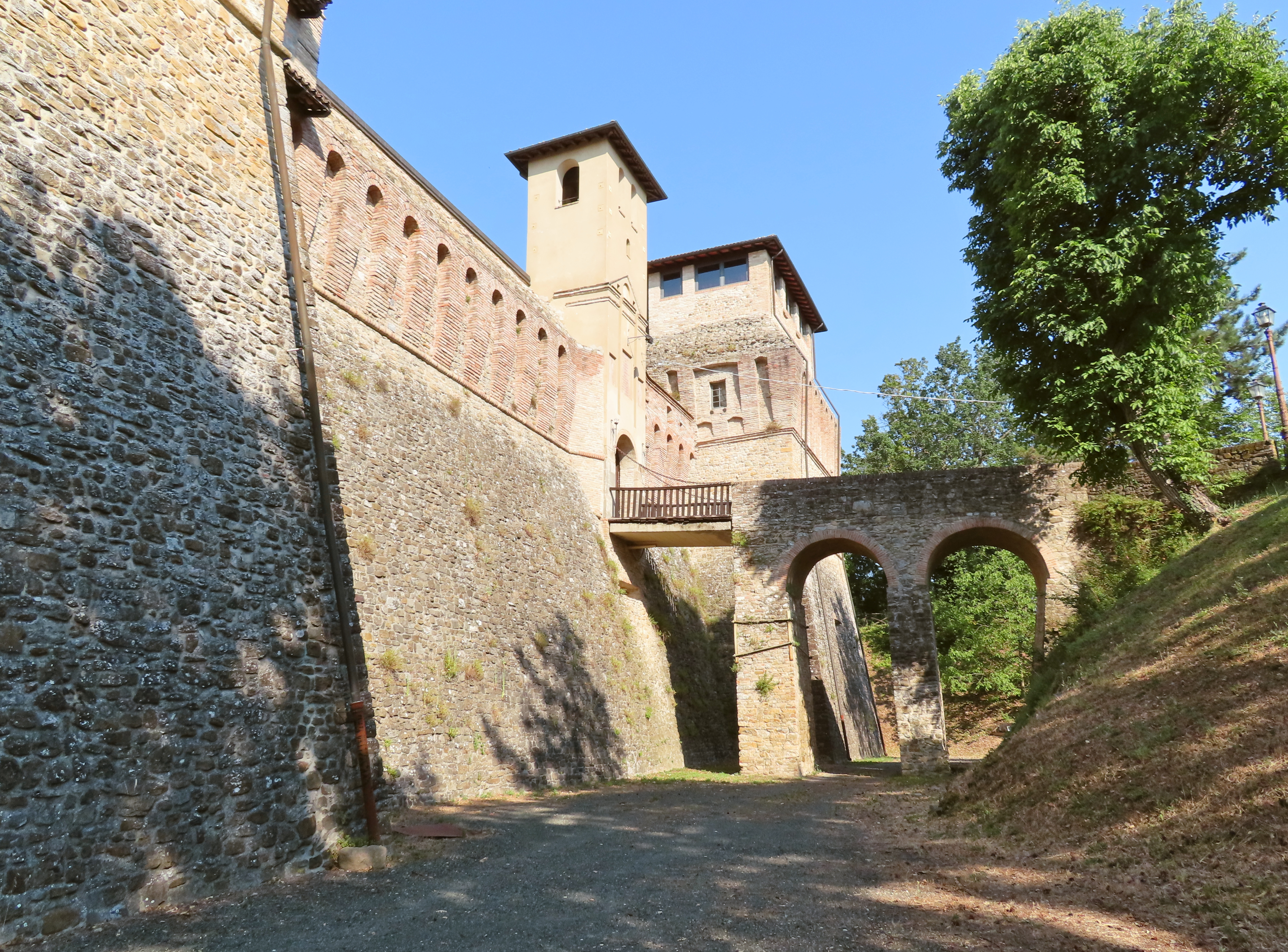
Facade

The castle, made entirely of stone mixed with bricks, stands on the top of a hill at the gates of the Baganza Valley, inside a park accessible through a high round brick portal. The manor is built on a rectangular plan around the central courtyard, with four towers placed at the ends and a turret in the middle of the southwestern side to protect the small entrance bridge; a deep moat stretches around the perimeter of the building, originally surrounded by walls and other fortifications, of which only a few traces survive the 15th-century destruction.

The building clearly shows signs of the demolitions ordered by Ludovico il Moro in 1483. The fortress rises on a high scarp base, on which several embrasures open here and there; the exterior elevations of the four castle bodies, as well as the keep to the south, are characterized by the presence of long corbels with machicolations, on which defensive structures were formerly placed, destroyed at the end of the 15th century.

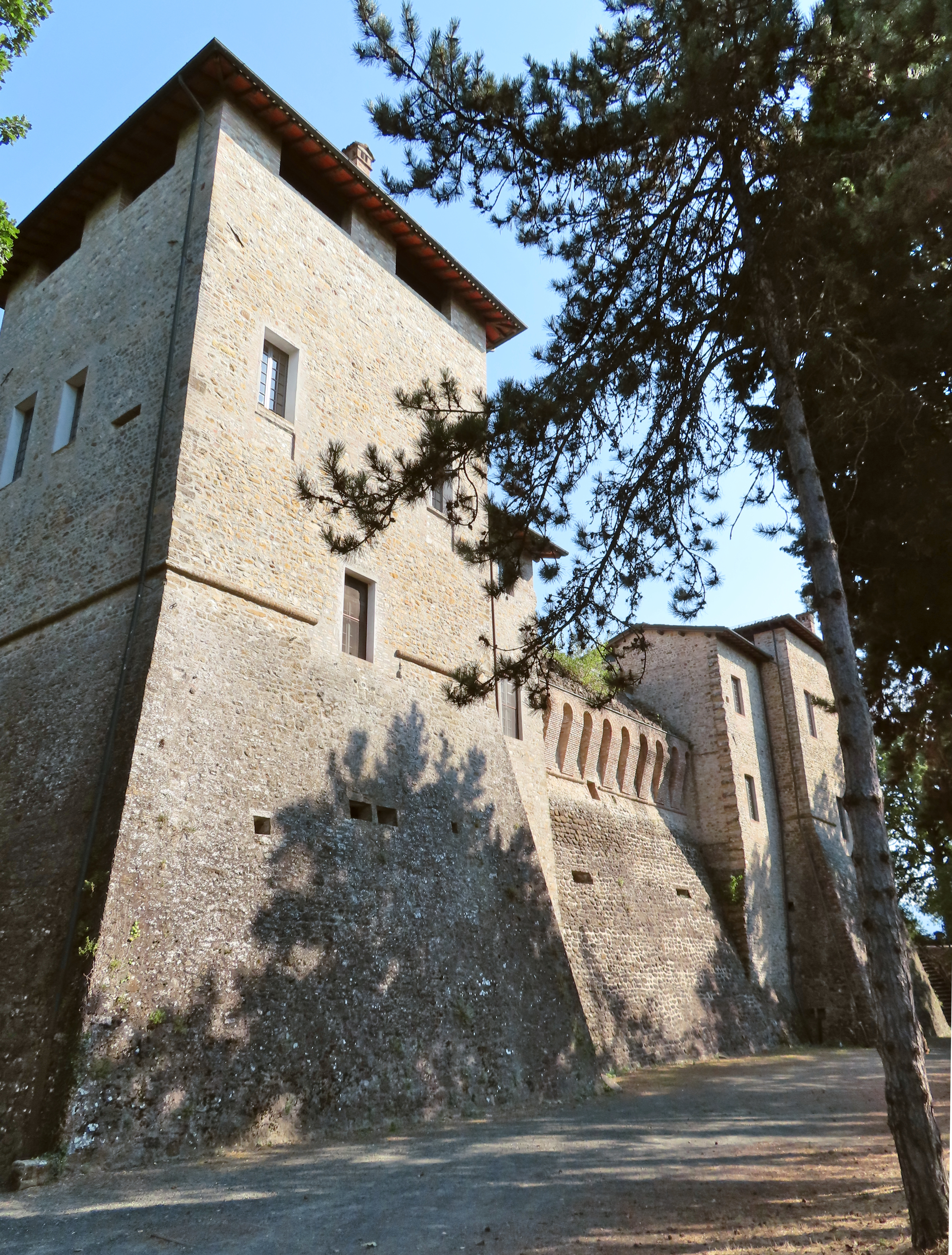
Northwest side

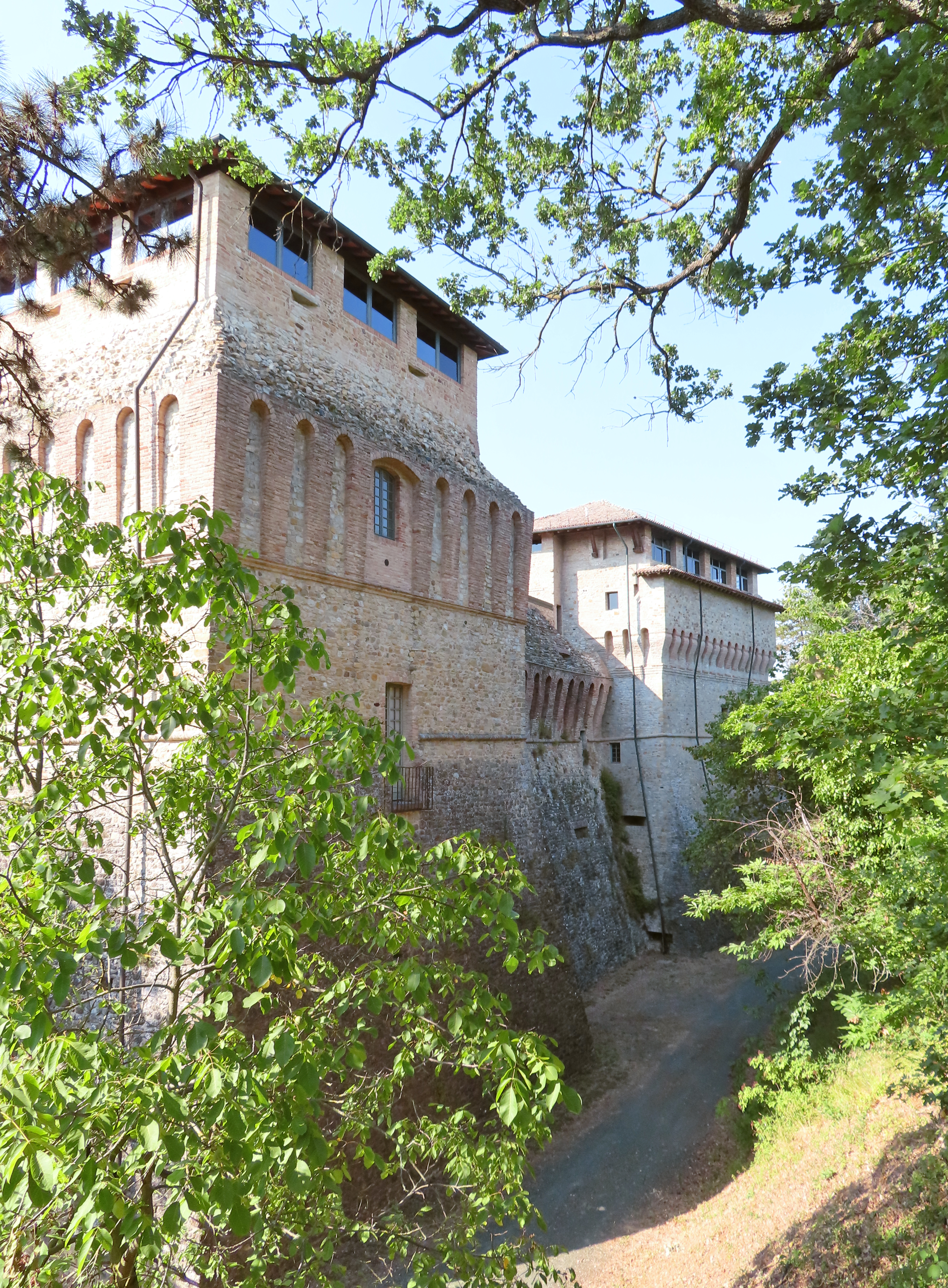
Southeast side

The main façade presents in the middle the building's only access, reached through a high stone arched bridge, the last wooden span of which was formerly a drawbridge; the round-arched entrance is surmounted by a plastered turret, characterized by the presence of the two tall slits that originally housed the bridge bolzone; at the top, above a small triangular pediment and a central opening, are symmetrically placed two single-light round-arched windows.

While the west and north towers have no corbels and culminate in a roof without a cornice, the east keep, probably rebuilt in the first half of the 16th century on an irregular pentagonal plan spurred northward, has a cornice of corbels on the perimeter and is topped by a dungeon, which reaches an elevation of 330 m above sea level.

Inside, the rectangular-plan courtyard, characterized by the presence of a well in the center, is bordered on all four sides by buildings that have been largely remodeled over time; the southwest and northwest wings open onto the wide space through a portico supported by brick pillars, surmounted by a loggia that also continues on the southeast side; the northeast wing preserves traces of a series of round arches on two levels, belonging to a double loggia closed in an unspecified period, the existence of which seems to be attested in eighteenth-century documents.

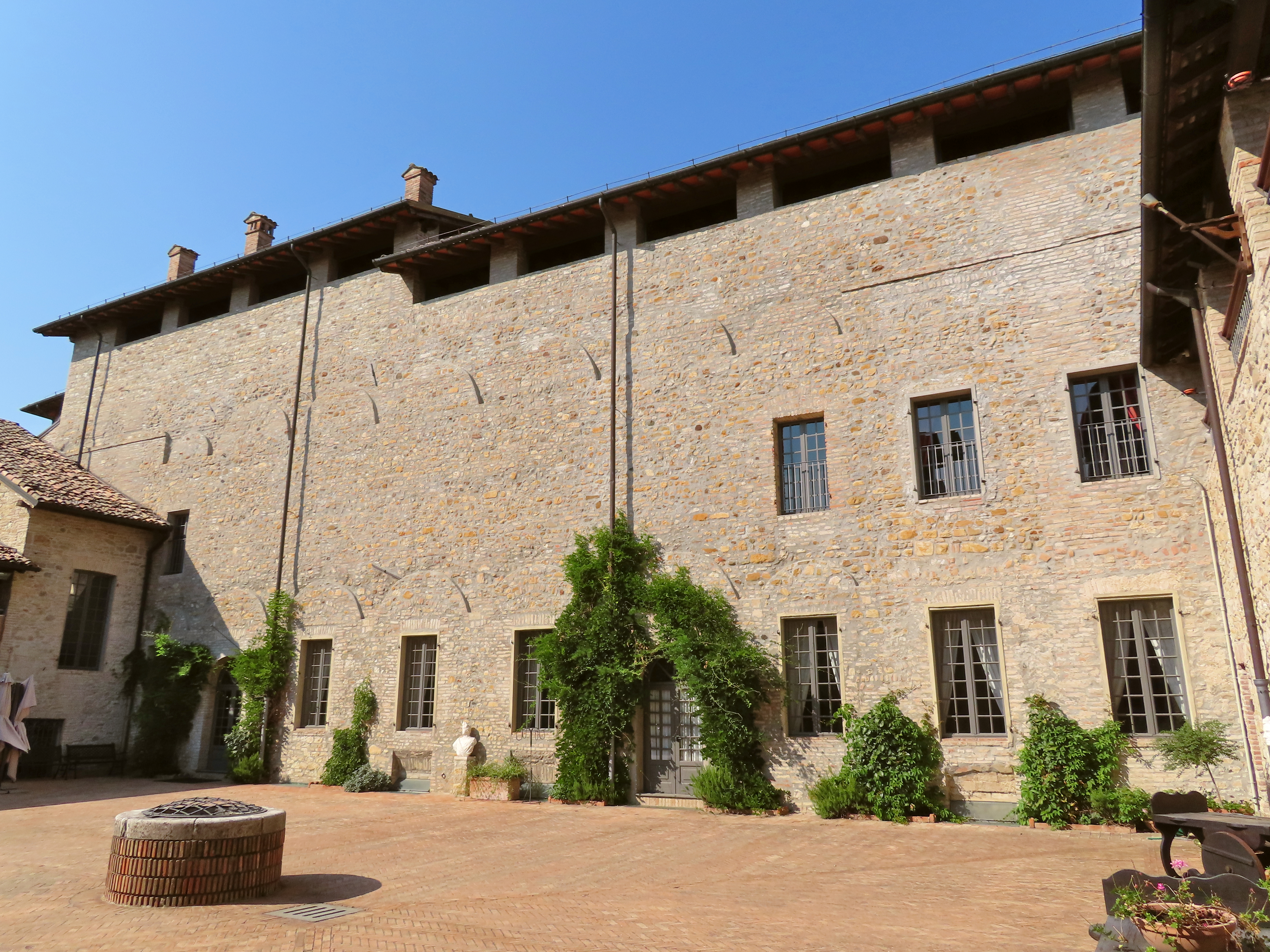
Northeast side of the inner courtyard

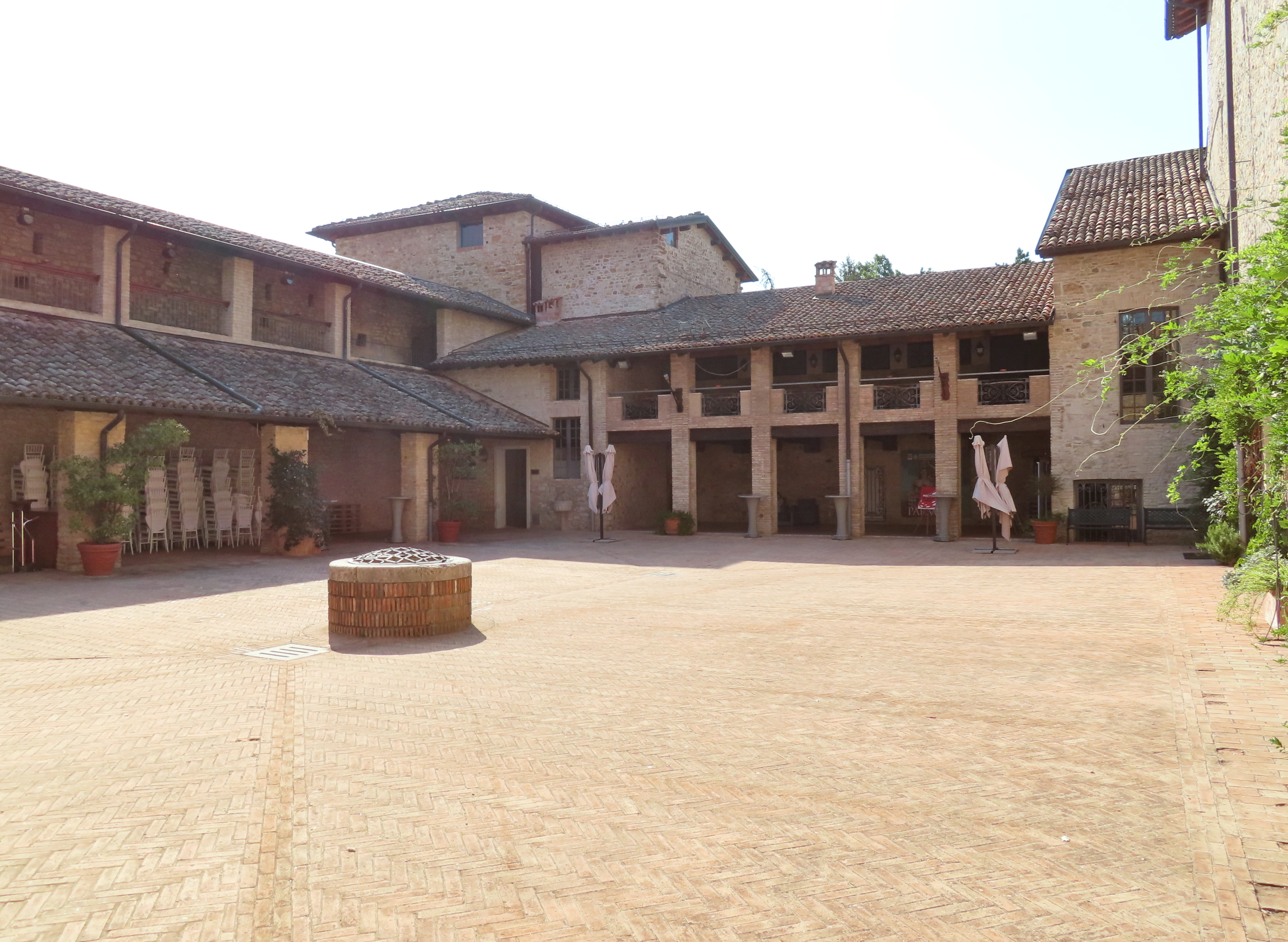
Northwest and southwest sides of the inner courtyard

The castle's buildings house various rooms with ancient fireplaces, in which weapons, armor, and other objects are displayed, including a bell made in 1652 at the behest of Duke Ranuccio II Farnese.

The most valuable room is the Oratory of St. Peter the Apostle, built between 1454 and 1455 at the behest of Pier Maria II de' Rossi on the second floor of the eastern tower; the room, covered by an umbrella vault, is decorated on the walls with frescoes discovered during restorations carried out in 1997. The paintings in the lunettes, dating from different eras, largely depict the coats of arms of some of the castle's owners, including Marquis Giacomo Gaufridi, Countess Vittoria Anguissola, Bishop Giacomo Rossi, Marquis Pallavicino and Luisa Pallavicino, Marquis Galeazzo and Girolamo Pallavicino, Count Girolamo Rho and Count Pier Maria II de' Rossi; two frescoes, depicting respectively the coat of arms of Cardinal Francesco Sforza di Santa Fiora, attributed to Cesare Baglione, and the Madonna del Pettirosso, probably made in the 15th century, are of particular value.

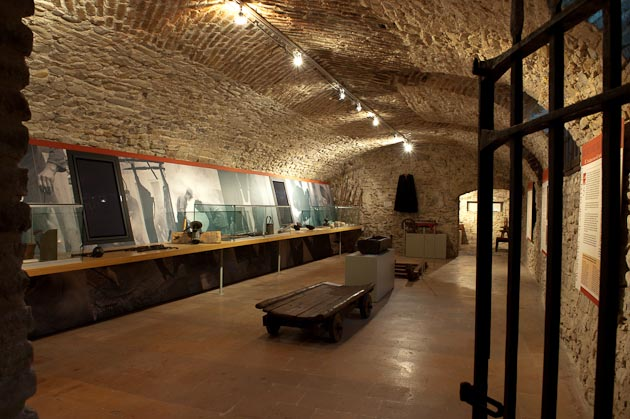
A room in the Felino salami museum

On the basement level, the cellars and ancient kitchens, entirely covered in stone and brick, are covered by barrel vaults; the rooms have housed the Felino salami museum since 2004.

== See also ==
- Felino
- Felino Salami Museum
- Rossi family
- Pallavicini family
- House of Sforza
- House of Farnese
- Roman Catholic Diocese of Parma

== Bibliography ==
- Affò, Ireneo (1793). Storia della città di Parma, Tomo secondo [History of the city of Parma, volume two] (in Italian). Parma: Stamperia Carmignani.
- Affò, Ireneo (1795). Storia della città di Parma, Tomo quarto [History of the city of Parma, volume four] (in Italian). Parma: Stamperia Carmignani.
- Angeli, Bonaventura (1591). La historia della città di Parma, et la descrittione del fiume Parma [The history of the city of Parma, et la descrittione del fiume Parma] (in Italian). Parma: appresso Erasmo Viotto.
- Arcangeli, Letizia; Gentile, Marco (2007). Le signorie dei Rossi di Parma tra XIV e XVI secolo [The lordships of the Rossi family of Parma between the 14th and 16th centuries] (in Italian). Firenze: Firenze University Press. ISBN 978-88-8453-683-9.
- Valeri, Francesco Malaguzzi (1913). La corte di Lodovico il Moro: la vita privata e l'arte a Milano nella seconda metà del Quattrocento Vol. 1 [The court of Lodovico il Moro: private life and art in Milan in the second half of the 15th centuryVol. 1] (in Italian). Milano: Hoepli.
- Molossi, Lorenzo (1834). Vocabolario topografico dei Ducati di Parma, Piacenza e Guastalla [Topographical Vocabulary of the Duchies of Parma, Piacenza and Guastalla] (in Italian). Parma: Tipografia Ducale. p. 634.
- Mordacci, Alessandra (2009). Il Castello di Felino [The Felino Castle] (in Italian). Parma: Gazzetta di Parma.
- Pezzana, Angelo (1837). Storia della città di Parma continuata, Tomo primo [History of the City of Parma Continued, Volume One] (in Italian). Parma: Ducale Tipografia.
- Pezzana, Angelo (1842). Storia della città di Parma continuata, Tomo secondo [History of the City of Parma Continued, Volume Two] (in Italian). Parma: Ducale Tipografia.
- Pezzana, Angelo (1852). Storia della città di Parma continuata, Tomo quarto [History of the City of Parma Continued, Volume Four] (in Italian). Parma: Reale Tipografia.
- Pezzana, Angelo (1859). Storia della città di Parma continuata, Tomo quinto [History of the City of Parma Continued, Volume Five] (in Italian). Parma: Reale Tipografia.
- Rosati, Angelica (2013). Da 150 a 600 - San Secondo dalla nascita di Pier Maria de' Rossi a Comune Parmense [From 150 to 600 - San Secondo from the birth of Pier Maria de' Rossi to Comune Parmense] (in Italian). San Secondo Parmense.
