= Felino =

Comune in the Province of Parma in the Italian region Emilia-Romagna

- Comune
- Comune di Felino
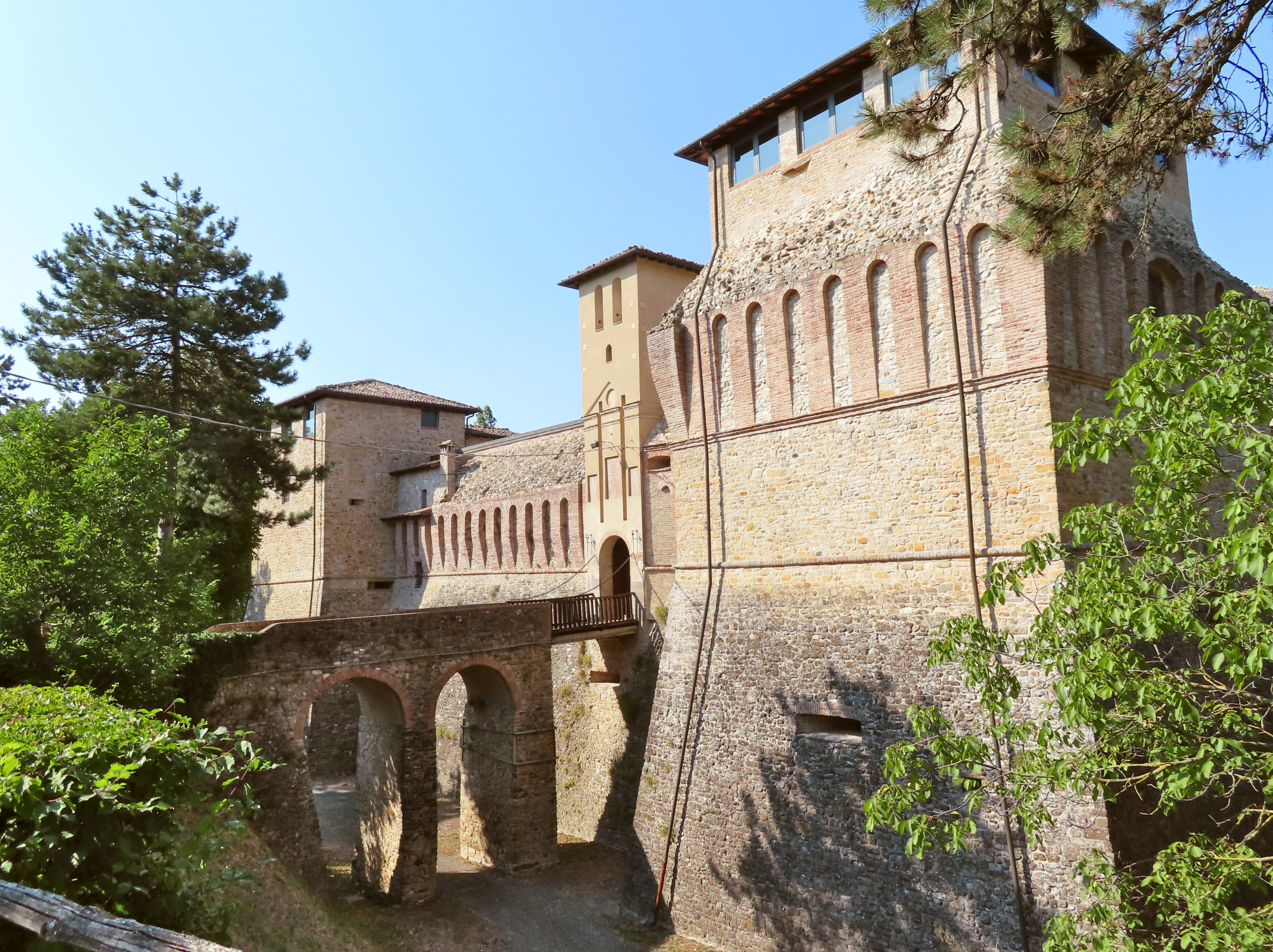
- Castle of Felino

- Felino within the Province of Parma

- Location within Italy Location within Emilia-Romagna
- Coordinates: 44°41′36.8″N 10°14′31.2″E
- Country: Italy
- Region: Emilia-Romagna
- Province: Parma (PR)
- Frazioni: Barbiano, Ca' Cotti, Ca' Gialla, Ca' Roma, Casale, La Resga, Monticello, Parigi, Poggio, San Michele de' Gatti, San Michele Tiorre, Sant'Ilario Baganza, Soragnola

Government
  - Mayor: Elisa Leoni

Area
  - Total: 38.3 km^{2} (14.8 sq mi)
- Elevation: 180 m (590 ft)

Population (31 July 2017)
  - Total: 8,860
  - Density: 231/km^{2} (599/sq mi)
- Demonym: Felinesi
- Time zone: UTC+1 (CET)
  - Summer (DST): UTC+2 (CEST)
- Postal code: 43035
- Dialing code: 0521
- Website: Official website

Felino (Parmigiano: Flén) is a comune (municipality) in the Province of Parma in the Italian region Emilia-Romagna, located about 90 kilometres (56 mi) west of Bologna and about 13 kilometres (8 mi) southwest of Parma. As of 2011 it had a population of 8,621.

== History ==
The town developed around the castle, built in 9th century, and the municipality was established in 1806. The town is the traditional home of Salame di Felino, along with other cities in Parma.

== Geography ==
Felino is in the western area of the Province of Parma, and its territory is part of the Boschi di Carrega Nature Park. The municipality borders with Calestano, Langhirano, Parma and Sala Baganza.

It counts 13 hamlets (frazioni):

Village	Population	Elevation
Barbiano	64	366 m
Ca' Cotti	29	174 m
Ca' Gialla	108	164 m
Ca' Roma	21	153 m
Casale	339	150 m
La Resga	31	163 m
Monticello	24	365 m
Parigi	21	180 m
Poggio	266	262 m
San Michele de' Gatti	319	220 m
San Michele Tiorre	1,495	186 m
Sant'Ilario Baganza	75	286 m
Soragnola	42	247 m

== Main sights ==
The main attractions are a castle, Castello di Felino (dating to the 9th century AD and destroyed by Ludovico Sforza in 1483, but now restored) and the museum of salami, a typical food of the area.

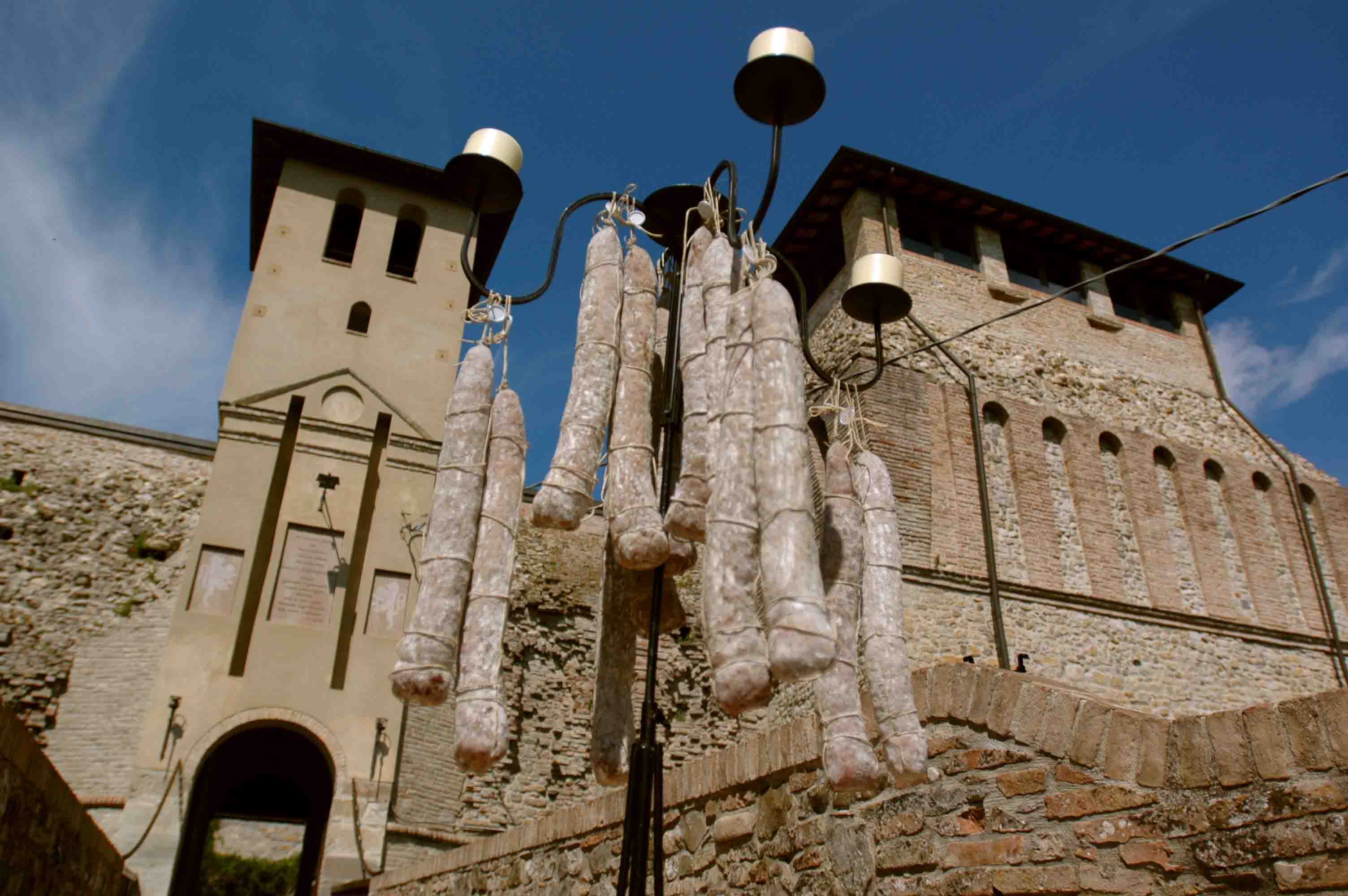
Towers of the castle.

== Twin towns ==
- Cumières, France

== See also ==
- Felino Castle
