= Rossi family =

Italian noble family

Rossi
- Noble family
- Country: Italy
- Current region: Province of Parma
- Founded: 1323
- Dissolution: 1482
- Cadet branches: Emilia

The Rossi family is an Italian noble lineage originating from the Emilia region, now part of the province of Parma. Their history is well-documented in the archives of Parma and San Secondo. The earliest recorded mention of the Rossi family in Emilia dates back to 1323.

== History ==
=== Origins ===
In the 14th century, the Rossi family established a notable presence in the region, including Berceto and Terenzo, located at the foot of the Parma Apennines, within the episcopal patrimony. Their rise began when Ugolino Rossi, son of Guglielmo, was appointed Bishop of Parma in 1324 at the age of 23. He held this position until he died in 1377, (Note: Murdered in Milan according to the Rossi of Parma genealogy website.) overseeing the mense and revenues from territories such as Berceto, Bardone, Corniglio, Bosco, Roccaprebalza, Roccaferrara, Corniana, and Castrignano, which became significant holdings for the Rossi family in the following century.

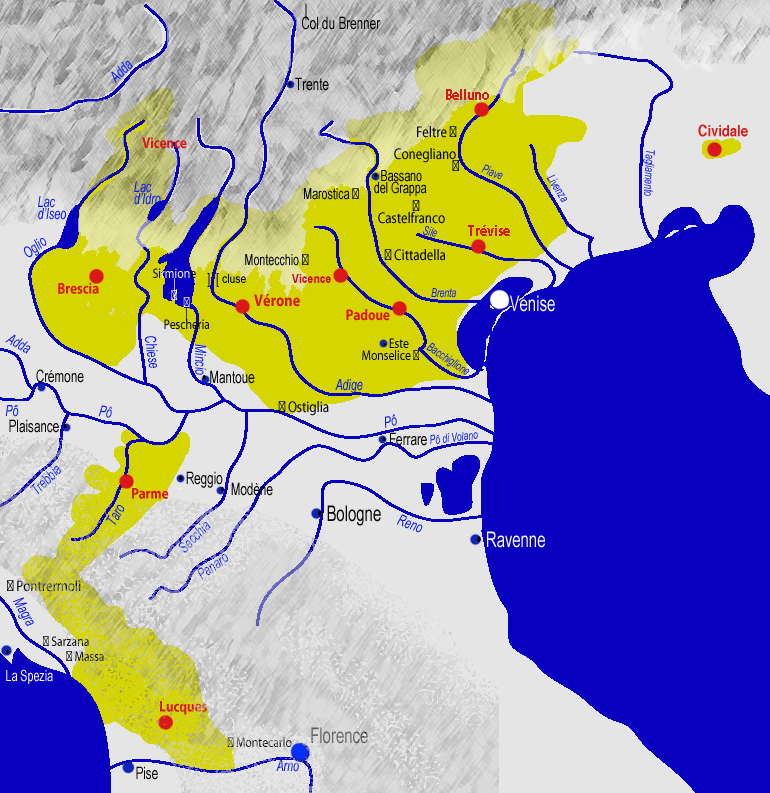
Scaliger family holdings in 1336

This appointment gave the family a long-term position in these territories, allowing them to generate income from their possessions. Ugolino had three brothers—Rolando, Marsilio, and Pietro—who were granted the title of Counts of Berceto on March 5, 1331, by John I of Bohemia. John I sought to expand his influence in northern Italy on behalf of the Guelph faction and occupied a substantial part of Emilia, including Parma, Reggio, and Modena. According to historian Marco Gentile, the Rossi family were uniquely positioned as the sole holders of the title of Count of Berceto, despite numerous other acquisitions. In 1336, the Rossi family's control was disrupted by the Scaliger family, who were associated with the opposing Ghibelline faction. The Rossi family's hold on Berceto faced challenges between 1350 and 1360.

The Rossi family expanded their territorial influence gradually through purchases, strategic marriages, and the development of a network of influence. In 1343, they acquired the castle near Terenzo from the di Palmia family, further extending their presence in the area.

=== Viscontian period ===
In 1346, a significant political shift occurred when Luchino Visconti acquired Parma for 60,000 gold florins from Obizzo III d'Este, the Marquis of Ferrara, who had held the city for two years after taking it from Azzo di Correggio. The Visconti family controlled the region from 1346 to 1447, with the exception of a brief period from 1404 to 1409, when Ottobon Terzi held power. In the same year, Felino Castle was transferred to Ugolino Rossi, son of Giacomo, and Giacomo dai Ruggeri. Within two generations, through a series of marriages between the Rossi and Ruggeri families, the castle, along with its jurisdiction and vassals, became permanently owned by the Rossi family. The Rossi family also acquired the Sant'Andrea castle in 1356 from several prominent local families, including the Palmias, Ruggeris, and Cornazzanos. Members of these families later held various positions within the Rossi administration, such as podestà, lords, or city council members.

The Rossi family's influence extended beyond Parma to surrounding territories, partly due to migration from these areas to the city, which was accelerated by the demographic impact of the Black Death pandemic of 1348. This migration, coupled with the Rossi family's strategic alliances and patronage, bolstered their influence in the region. The Rossis recognized the importance of mutual support and reciprocity, fostering relationships with key figures such as Antonio Carissimi, the duchy's general accountant, and Leonardo Cassinari, the secret chancellor, who advanced their careers in Milan and within the Visconti duchy.

In 1355, Giacomo Rossi and Agnese, the widow of Rolando Rossi, initiated legal action against Bishop Ugolino for the non-repayment of a loan. This resulted in the acquisition of Corniglio, Roccaprebalza, Roccaferrara, and Corniana from the episcopal mense. Later, in 1365, the chapter of Parma Cathedral sold Giacomo Rossi the rights held by the canons over the castle and lands of San Secondo. This acquisition was followed in 1376 by the castle of Castrignano (now part of Langhirano), which the bishop granted to his grand-nephew Rolando Rossi, Giacomo's son.

In 1375, Rolando Rossi acquired properties and vassals on the right bank of the River Po in the Cremona area and within the diocese of Cremona at Rezinoldo, the future site of the Roccabianca castle (now located in the province of Parma). The acquired lands included Tolarolo, Polsine Manfredi, Fossa, Stagno, and Motta Baluffi. In 1376, a conflict emerged with the Pallavicino family following their purchase of land from another Da Borgo in the same area. This rivalry led to a series of disputes, lawsuits, and armed conflicts that persisted for more than a century. In the 15th century, the Pallavicino family gained the upper hand in this rivalry, largely due to the support of Ludovico Sforza.

The acquisition of these territories allowed the Rossi family to join the influential circle of the squadre, a term used in Western Emilia to describe powerful noble families that engaged with the city of Parma. In other regions, these groups were referred to as factions. The Sanvitale, Correggio, and Pallavicino families held seats on Parma's councils and occupied significant positions within the local administration, which afforded them influence over the city's political affairs. By 1380, Rossi supporters began requesting a reassessment of their representation on the councils to better reflect their standing. In response, other families insisted on maintaining equal representation, which led Rossi supporters to refuse to assume their council positions in 1388. This demand for fair representation continued throughout the remainder of the 14th century.

Following the death of Bishop Ugolino in 1377, Rolando and Bertrando Rossi assumed leadership of the family without opposition. In 1385, Gian Galeazzo Visconti expanded his control over the future Duchy of Milan by orchestrating the assassination of his uncle Bernabò Visconti. During the reign of Bernabò Visconti and his sons, who became lords of Parma in 1364, tensions existed between the Rossis and other noble families. However, relations improved under Gian Galeazzo, allowing the Rossi family to maintain their properties. Felino was controlled by Bertrando, while San Secondo was held by Rolando, (Note: In 1387, Gian Galeazzo confirmed the immunity and exemptions for Felino in Bertrando and San Secondo in Rolando.) with the properties of the episcopal mense remaining undivided.

In 1386, Rolando became the podestà of Pavia, while Bertrando maintained a close relationship with the Visconti court, serving as an advisor to Gian Galeazzo and executing critical diplomatic missions, including those to the French court. This period was also marked by the production of missal books of hours in Pavia and Milan, containing 72 miniatures. One notable illustration depicts Bertrando in prayer at the feet of the Virgin. These missals, likely used during Bertrando's diplomatic missions, are now housed in the Bibliothèque nationale de France, thanks to the Smith-Lesouef donation in 1913. Bertrando continued the production of works initiated by his relative Ugolino, including the Pontificale, intended for episcopal use, and the Messale, which serves as an obituary and records the birth of Pietro Maria.

Bertrando's eldest son, Giacomo, pursued a career in the church and was appointed Bishop of Verona by Gian Galeazzo in 1388. Rolando died in 1389 without male heirs and was buried in the Franciscan church in Parma. Following his death, his assets and rights were transferred to Bertrando, consolidating the latter's position and that of his descendants. Bertrando, who died in 1397, had two other sons, Giovanni and Pietro, as well as a natural son named Leonardo. In 1406, Leonardo rebelled against his half-brothers to seize control of San Secondo. Little is known about Giovanni, who also died without legitimate heirs around 1402. In 1397, Giovanni and his brother Pietro occupied the castle of Scipione in Salsomaggiore Terme, which the Rossis claimed under a contested will that was ultimately deemed invalid. The estate was transferred to Pietro, who had only one legitimate son, Pietro Maria.

=== Emancipation attempts ===
After the death of Gian Galeazzo in 1402 from the plague, the duchy was left in the hands of his thirteen-year-old son, Gian Maria Visconti. During this period of instability, the Rossi family, like other rival factions, sought to expand their influence. They set two primary objectives, dedicating all their political, military, and financial resources to these goals. One of their main aims was to expand towards Lunigiana and reclaim Pontremoli, a town that had been under Rossi control in the early 14th century. They aligned themselves with the Guelph faction and received financial support from Florence in their bid to seize control of Parma. However, this support was withdrawn after Ottobon Terzi's victory. Despite this setback, Pietro Rossi and Ottobon formed a strategic alliance in 1404 to maintain control of Parma, despite opposition from Giovanni Maria Visconti, who subsequently appealed to the Apennine Guelphs for support. Initially, their plan was successful, but Ottobon soon removed Pietro from his position, leading to a prolonged conflict that caused significant damage to the Parma region. During this conflict, the Rossis seized control of Berceto and the surrounding areas from the Sanvitales, but faced opposition from the Ghibelline Fieschi family, particularly over control of the strategic La Cisa Pas route.

In their bid to control half of Pontremoli, the Rossi family pledged allegiance to King Charles VI of France, who was also the ruler of Genoa, to secure his support. During this time, Giacomo Rossi, who had been the Bishop of Verona, left the city due to its invasion by the Venetians and took responsibility for the Diocese of Luni (Dioecesis Lunensis). However, the situation soon turned unfavorable for the Rossi family. Unable to achieve their objectives, Giacomo and Pietro sold their share of Pontremoli to the Fieschi family, who had allied with Ottobon Terzi. The conflict had devastating consequences for the Rossis, as they were forced to surrender several castles to the Terzi and, in 1408, lost the castle of Grodola, located beyond the Pas de la Cisa. Pietro was captured by Luca Fieschi and had to pay 10,000 florins for his release.

Despite these setbacks, the Rossi family continued to maneuver politically. In 1406, Pietro appointed a procurator to negotiate a peace treaty and alliance with Giovanni Maria and Filippo Maria Visconti. In 1408, the Rossi family joined an alliance led by Niccolò III d'Este against Ottobon Terzi and presented the Marquis of Ferrara with a 24-chapter document detailing their grievances. They demanded the return of their rights, properties, and castles, as well as new possessions and compensation for the damages caused by the Terzi occupation. Additionally, they refused to recognize themselves as subjects of any future ruler of Parma and its surrounding region. In 1409, the Rossi approached the Venetians to offer their services against the Freschi, who supported Jean II Le Maingre, the governor of Genoa on behalf of Charles VI of France.

In 1409, the League succeeded in eliminating Ottobon, and Niccolò III took control of Parma. As a result, the Rossi family regained a significant portion of their claims, establishing a cohesive geographical area consisting of eight towns and numerous castles, with Felino at its center. Berceto and Felino were the most populous towns and served as important market centers.

In 1418, Giacomo Rossi, who had become the Archbishop of Naples, died without securing the bishopric of Parma or Verona, despite his brothers' efforts to intervene with Niccolò III. Before his death, Giacomo disinherited his natural son, Marsilio, and bequeathed all his assets to Pietro and his nephews, further consolidating the Rossi family's holdings.

== See also ==
=== Bibliography ===
- Avril, François (1984). Dix siècles d'enluminure italienne : VIe – XVIe siècles [Ten centuries of Italian book illumination: 6th - 16th centuries] (in French). Paris: Bibliothèque nationale.
- Barbieri, Vittorio (1998). I Torelli: Conti di Montechiarugolo (1406-1612) [The Torelli: Counts of Montechiarugolo (1406-1612)] (in Italian).
- Blumenfeld-Kosinski, Renate; Petkov, Kiril (2011). Philippe de Mézières and his age : piety and politics in the fourteenth century. Brill Academic Pub. ISBN 978-9004211131.
- Guyotjeannin, Olivier (1985). "Conflits de juridiction et exercice de la justice à Parme et dans son territoire d'après une enquête de 1218" [Conflicts of jurisdiction and the exercise of justice in Parma and its territory according to a survey of 1218.]. Mélanges de l'École française de Rome: Moyen Âge, Temps Modernes (in French). 97: 183–300. doi:10.3406/mefr.1985.2800.
- Arcangeli, Letizia; Gentile, Marco (2007). Le signorie dei Rossi di Parma tra XIV e XVI secolo [The seigniories of the Rossi of Parma between the 14th and 16th centuries]. Reti Medievali E-Book (in Italian). Vol. 10. Firenze University Press. doi:10.36253/978-88-8453-684-6. ISBN 978-88-8453-684-6.
- Stella, Gianfranco (1988). Parma (in Italian). Quaderni Parmensi.
- Zanichelli, Giuseppa Z. (2007). La committenza dei Rossi : immagini di potere fra sacro e profano [Rossi patronage: images of power between the sacred and the profane]. Le signorie dei Rossi di Parma tra XIV e XVI secolo (in Italian). Firenze University Press. doi:10.1400/90103.
- Gentile, Marco (2007). La formazione del dominio dei Rossi tra XIV e XV secolo [The formation of the rule of the Rossi family between the 14th and 15th centuries]. Le signorie dei Rossi di Parma tra XIV e XVI secolo (in Italian). Firenze University Press. pp. 23–55.
- Bulgarelli, Mario (2010). Il feudo di Zelarino (dei Foscari) 1331 - 1858 [The fief of Zelarino (dei Foscari) 1331 - 1858] (in Italian). La Malcontenta. ISBN 9788895745237.
