= San Michele Tiorre =

- Frazione
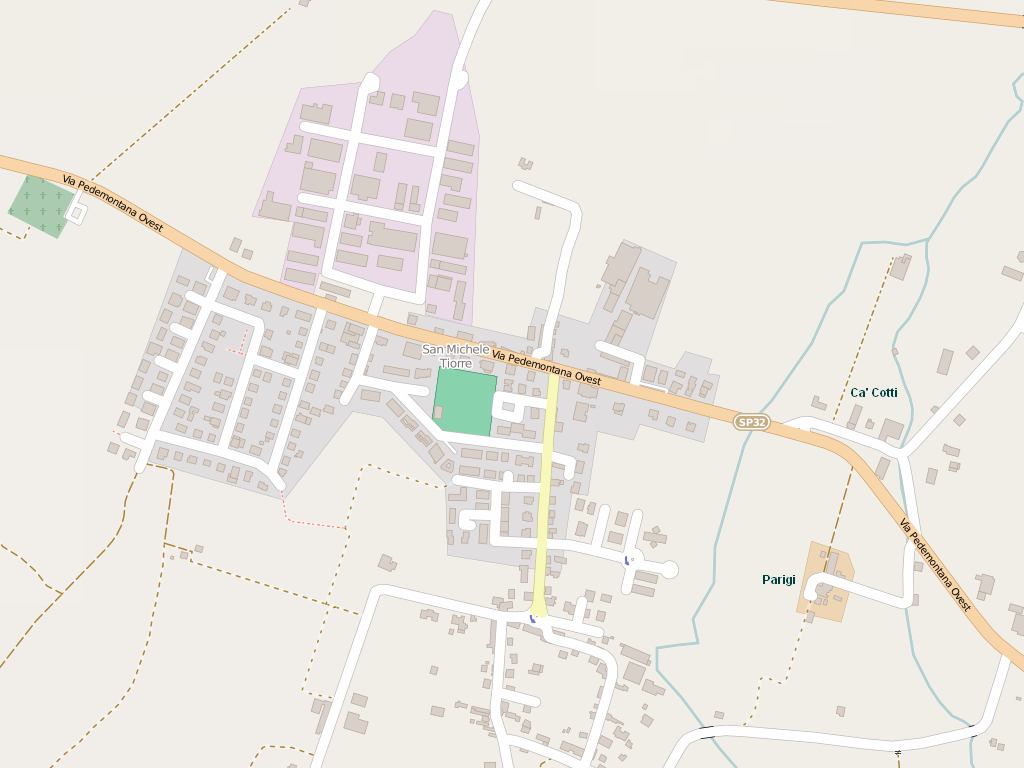
- OSM map of San Michele Tiorre including the nearby villages of Ca' Cotti and Parigi

- Location of San Michele Tiorre in Italy
- Coordinates: 44°41′19.1″N 10°15′43.2″E
- Country: Italy
- Region: Emilia-Romagna
- Province: Parma (PR)
- Comune: Felino
- Elevation: 186 m (610 ft)

Population (2014)
  - Total: 2,384
- Demonym: San Michelesi
- Time zone: UTC+1 (CET)
  - Summer (DST): UTC+2 (CEST)
- Postal code: 43035
- Dialing code: (+39) 0521
- Patron saint: St. Odile
- Website: Official website
- gazzetta di parma del 15.03.2017

San Michele Tiorre, also known as Tiorre, is an Italian village and the major hamlet (frazione) of Felino, a municipality in the province of Parma, Emilia-Romagna. As of 2009 its population was 1,495.

== History ==
The village, first mentioned in a parchment of 1092, grew around the castle of Tiorre, located on a hill and nowadays in ruins. Part of Felino from 1806, year of establishment of the municipality, San Michele Tiorre grew urbanistically in the last decades of the 20th century, increasing the population.

== Geography ==
San Michele is located 17 km in south of Parma, in the middle of a plain between the rivers Baganza and Parma, close to Cinghio creek and below the Northern Apennines. The nearest settlements are the villages of Ca' Cotti, Parigi, La Resga, Pilastro (2 km east, in the comune of Langhirano), and Felino (1.7 km west).

The industrial (north) and the residential (south) areas are separated by the provincial highway SP32, that crosses the village in the middle. Another highway serving San Michele di Tiorre is the SP 665R/var.

== Demographics ==
Historical population
Year	Pop.	±%
1910	1,730	—
1970	900	−48.0%
2001	1,800	+100.0%
2014	2,384	+32.4%

== See also ==
- Parigi (Felino)
