= Ottobon Terzi =

Italian condottiero and nobleman (died 1409)

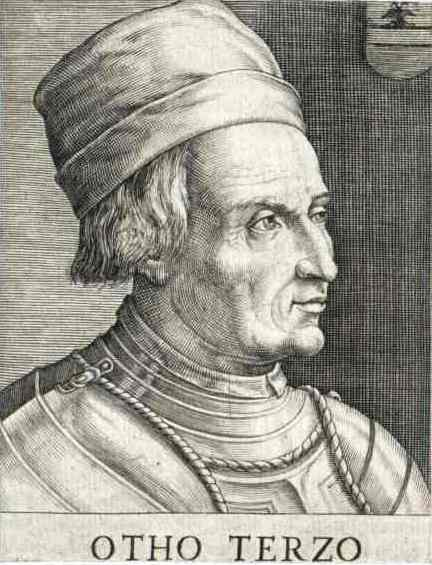
- Ottobon Terzi

Lord of Parma and Reggio
- Reign: 1404 – 27 May 1409
- Born: Parma
- Died: May 27, 1409; Rubiera
- Noble family: Terzi
- Spouses: Orsina; Francesca da Fogliano
- Issue: Niccolò il Guerriero; Jacopo; Giorgio; Niccolò Carlo; Margherita; Caterina
- Father: Niccolò Terzi il Vecchio
- Mother: Madonna Margherita
- Occupation: Condottiero

Ottobuono de' Terzi (also known as Otto Buonterzo or Ottobono) was an Italian condottiero and nobleman born in Parma and died in Rubiera on 27 May 1409. A ruthless military leader with a notorious reputation, he gained experience under John Hawkwood and fought in the Kingdom of Naples for Antonio Acquaviva. He later served the Republic of Venice and Gian Galeazzo Visconti. Ottobuono was granted the title of Count of Tizzano Val Parma and Castelnuovo, and later the Marquisate of Borgo San Giovanni. He received lands in Montecchio Emilia, Brescello, Colorno, and Fiorenzuola d'Arda. In 1403, he established his lordship over Parma, Reggio Emilia, and Piacenza, which he held until spring 1409, when his enemies, led by the House of Este, allied against him and ultimately orchestrated his assassination.

== Background ==
During the late 14th and early 15th centuries, while much of Europe was dominated by large monarchies such as France, England, Spain, and Portugal, the Italian peninsula was fragmented into numerous city-states and factions. These were divided into two main groups: the Guelphs, allied with the Papal States, and the Ghibellines, aligned with the House of Hohenstaufen and the Holy Roman Empire. This period marked a transition in Italy from governance by communes to lordships. The office of podestà, once a temporary position, increasingly fell to members of prominent noble families. Notable examples include the Visconti in Milan, the Este in Ferrara, and the Scala in Verona. Over time, titles and powers became lifelong and hereditary, giving rise to dynasties that controlled multiple cities, forming regional states.

== Biography ==
=== Family ===
Ottobuono belonged to the Terzi family of Parma. He was the eldest son of Niccolò Terzi il Vecchio and Margherita. After becoming a widower in August 1405, he married Francesca, daughter of Carlo da Fogliano, on 1 December 1405 in Parma. Ottobuono fathered six children: Jacopo, Niccolò (known as "the Warrior"), Giorgio, Niccolò Carlo, Margherita, and Caterina.

=== Early military career ===
From 1393 to 1397, Ottobuono fought primarily in central Italy, including the Marche, where he was active in Offida and defended Fermo against Antonio Aceti. He also campaigned in Tuscany and Umbria. In Pisa, he fought alongside Alberico da Barbiano and Giovanni da Barbiano against Bernardo della Serra to counter Florentine forces. In 1397, after a failed attempt to capture San Miniato, he ravaged the regions of Lucca and the Florentine countryside, engaging in plunder, arson, and taking prisoners for ransom. Stopped at the Serchio River in San Quirico di Moriano, he withdrew with Paolo Orsini and Broglia. In August, he moved to the Mantua region and participated in the Battle of Governolo (1397) alongside his father, commanding the fifth line of 1,000 cavalry. Unhorsed by a lance from the Count da Carrara, he fought on foot with an axe until remounted by allies.

In May 1398, Gian Galeazzo Visconti renewed his command. The following year, Ottobuono returned to Tuscany, supporting the lordship of Gherardo d’Appiano in Pisa alongside Facino Cane. In May 1399, allied with Fuzzolino Tedesco, Mostarda da Forlì, and Astorre I Manfredi, he led 800 cavalry and 1,200 infantry sent by Bologna to support Malatesta and papal troops in the Marche. At Cingoli, he was defeated after a nine-hour assault by the companies of Broglia and Carrara.

In January 1400, Ottobuono entered Perugia with Visconti’s commissioner Pietro Scrovegni, leading 800 lances to support the Raspanti and Biordo Michelotti in transferring the city’s sovereignty to the Duchy of Milan. That same year, he campaigned in Romagna, aiding Barbiano during the siege of Faenza, and later assisted Paolo Guinigi in Lucca’s lordship. In 1401, he helped defeat an army under the command of Rupert of the Palatinate at the Battle of Nave.

=== Personal ambitions ===
Map of Italy in 1402. Archduchy of Austria County of Gorizia County of Nice County of Provence County of Savoy County of Urbino Duchy of Milan Papal States Margraviate of Montferrat Margraviate of Saluzzo Patriarchate of Aquileia Prince-Bishopric of Chur Prince-Bishopric of Sion Prince-Bishopric of Trent Republic of Florence Republic of Genoa Republic of Venice Kingdom of France Kingdom of Naples Kingdom of Sicily Lordship of Ferrara Lordship of Lunigiana Lordship of Mantua Lordship of Ravenna Lordship of Rimini Other States

Following the death of Gian Galeazzo Visconti in 1402, many lords in the Parma region rebelled against centralized rule. Alliances, often fleeting, were formed among the Sanvitale, Rossi, Da Correggio, Terzi, and Pallavicino. Ottobuono, a Visconti condottiero, was appointed marshal (maniscalco) in 1405, granting him command of a small army. He received lands near Montechiarugolo but could not prevent the Rossi from sacking Basilicagoiano and much of the territory. (Note: Basilicagoiano is currently a frazione of Montechiarugolo.) The strategic fortress of Montechiarugolo was captured in January 1404 but later retaken by Ottobuono due to its proximity to the Este state.

In March 1404, Ottobuono, allied with Pietro Rossi and Guido, played a key role in conquering Parma. Indebted to Ottobuono, Giovanni Maria Visconti named him lord of Parma. Ottobuono expelled Pietro Rossi and the Guelph faction, sparking renewed conflict that led to the massacre of 300 men. Ottobuono assembled 2,500 infantry in Montechiarugolo and, with Guido, seized Reggio Emilia, becoming lord of Parma, Piacenza, and Reggio.

In January 1405, alongside Visconti and Venetian troops, Ottobuono joined Francesco I of Mantua in the siege of Verona, then held by Jacopo da Carrara. Guido was captured but freed after a local rebellion. In March 1405, Guido captured Porporano castle with bombards, 300 cavalry, and 700 infantry, later attacking Mamiano and conquering bastions in Lesignano, San Michele di Tiorre, and Castrignano, halted only by snowfall.

Guido received properties in Parma from Ottobuono, formerly owned by the Rossi. On 3 October 1406, on Ottobuono’s recommendation, Giovanni Maria Visconti granted Guido the fiefs of Montechiarugolo and Guastalla, including Monticelli, Montorano, Marano, Tortiano, Basilicagoiano, Pegorale, and Lesignano de’ Bagni. These privileges allowed Guido to administer justice, appoint officials, and collect taxes, though subject to Milan’s approval. He married Orsina Visconti, a cousin of Giovanni Maria Visconti.

=== Submission to Niccolò III d’Este ===
In 1407, Guido was appointed governor of Reggio. He fought Niccolò III d’Este’s troops, devastating Scandiano and Sesso. Ottobuono’s growing brutality led to the execution of 65 Parma residents suspected of treason and the plundering of Piacenza, despite his lordship. During peace negotiations on 27 May 1409 in Rubiera, Ottobuono, now widely despised, was assassinated by Giacomo Attendolo, founder of the Sforza dynasty. Guido was briefly imprisoned in Modena. In exchange for his release, his father, Marsilio, his wife, Orsina, and his son, Cristoforo, became hostages of Niccolò III and were taken to Mantua, while Guido was forced to collaborate with Este. He was tasked with conquering Pariano castle in Basilicanova, defended by 100 cavalry, to cut off aid to San Polo d’Enza. Montechiarugolo passed to Niccolò III, whom Guido defended against Ottobuono’s sons. Parma also swore allegiance to Niccolò III, supported by the Scotti and Pallavicino, until 1420. At Niccolò III’s request, Guido conquered Forlì and returned it to the Ordelaffi at the pope’s behest.

== Descendants ==
- Niccolò de' Terzi, known as "the Warrior" (c. 1395), son of Cecilia Lapergola (unmarried).
- From Orsina (d. 1405): two sons, Jacopo (or Giacomo) and Giorgio.
- From Francesca da Fogliano: three children:
  - Niccolò Carlo (b. 6 December 1406), celebrated with festivities, bell-ringing, and the release of prisoners in Parma, Reggio, and their castles. His baptism at Christmas included godparents such as the Bishop of Trento, the Duke of Milan, Ugolotto, Bishop Rossi, the Marquis of Ferrara, the Lord of Mantua, Carlo Malatesta of Rimini, the Republic of Venice, Giacomo del Verme, and the Cardinal of Bologna.
  - Margherita
  - Caterina

== See also ==
- House of Este
- Visconti family
- Condottiero
- John Hawkwood
- Gian Galeazzo Visconti
- Guelphs and Ghibellines
- Signoria
- Duchy of Milan

== Bibliography ==
- Barbieri, Vittorio (1998). I Torelli [The Torelli] (in Italian). Montecchio: l'Olmo. p. 220.
- Cont, Paolo (2017). I Terzi di Parma, Sissa e Fermo [The Terzi of Parma, Sissa, and Fermo] (in Italian). Parma: Deputazione di Storia Patria per le Province Parmensi. p. 191. ISBN 978-88-941135-5-6. Archived from the original on June 26, 2019.
