= Parigi, Felino =

Parigi
- Frazione
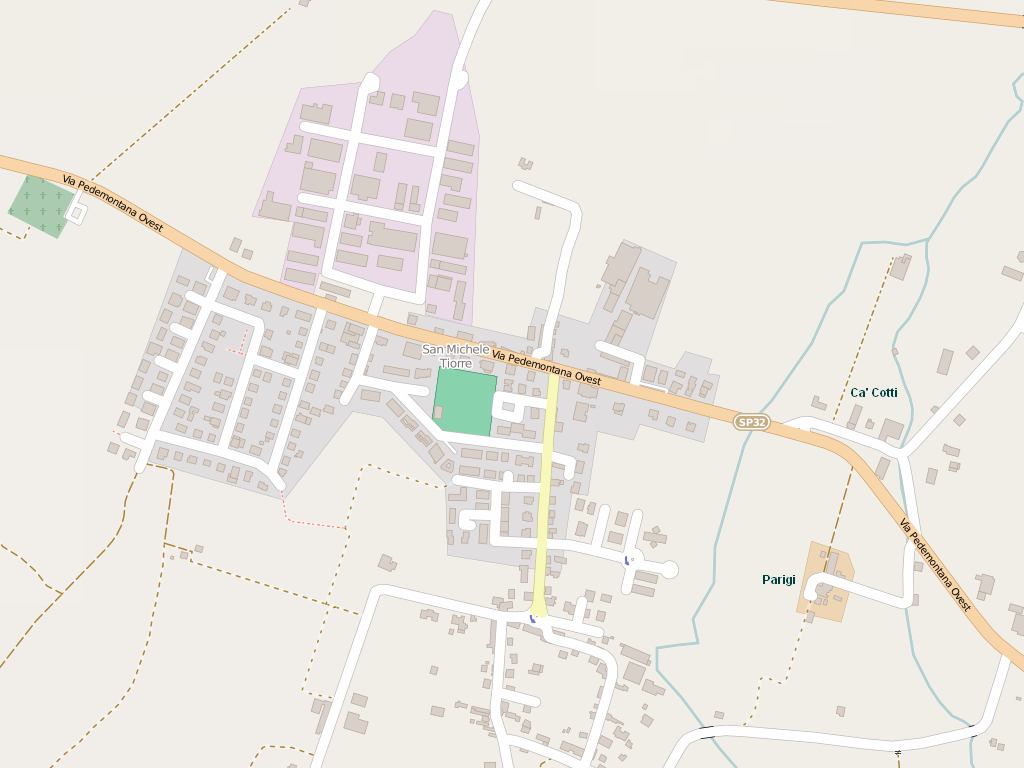
- OSM map of San Michele Tiorre showing also Ca' Cotti and Parigi (bottom right corner, in light green)

- Location of Parigi in Italy
- Coordinates: 44°41′04.9″N 10°16′18.2″E
- Country: Italy
- Region: Emilia-Romagna
- Province: Parma (PR)
- Comune: Felino
- Elevation: 180 m (590 ft)

Population (2009)
  - Total: 21
- Demonym: Parigini
- Time zone: UTC+1 (CET)
  - Summer (DST): UTC+2 (CEST)
- Postal code: 43035
- Dialing code: (+39) 0521

Parigi is an Italian village and hamlet (frazione) of Felino, a municipality in the province of Parma, Emilia-Romagna. The toponym derives from the French capital city, Paris, which in Italian is Parigi. In 2009, it had a population of 21.

The village located on a side road of the provincial highway SP32, named Via Ilario Bragazzi. Composed by some farmhouses, it is close to Cinghio creek and to the villages of San Michele Tiorre, Ca' Cotti and La Resga. It is 1.6 km far from Pilastro, 1.2 from Calicella (both hamlets of Langhirano), 3 from Felino, and 17 from the city centre of Parma.

== See also ==
- San Michele Tiorre
- Marsiglia (Davagna)
