= Montechiarugolo =

- Comune
- Comune di Montechiarugolo
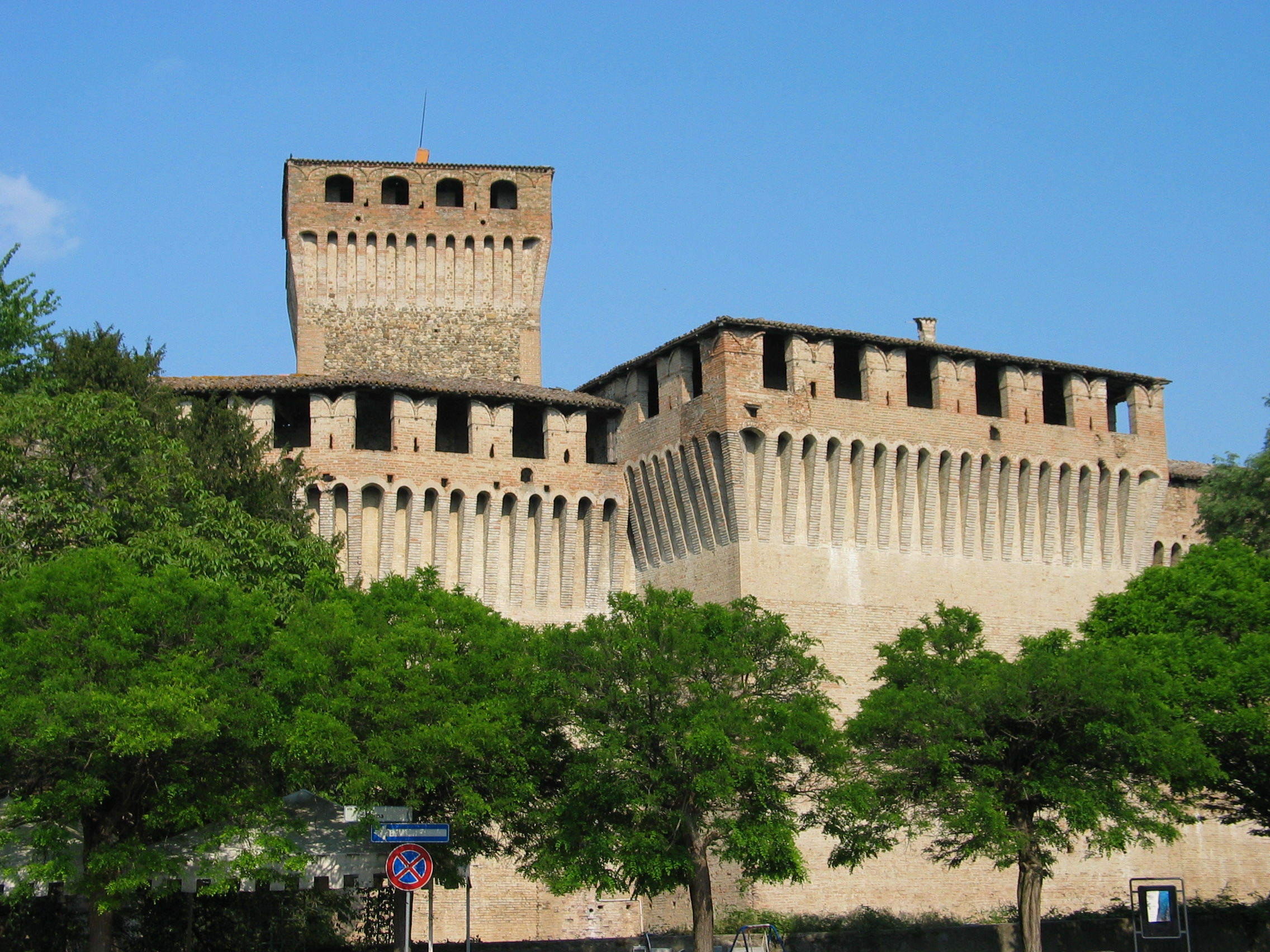
- Montechiarugolo Castle

- Location within Italy Location within Emilia-Romagna
- Coordinates: 44°42′N 10°25′E
- Country: Italy
- Region: Emilia-Romagna
- Province: Parma (PR)
- Frazioni: Basilicagoiano, Basilicanova, Cantone di Pariano, Case Nuove, Castello, Convento, Fornace Vecchia, La Fratta, Lovetta, Malcantone, Masdone, Monte, Monticelli Chiesa, Monticelli Terme, Pecorile, Piazza, Piazzola, San Geminiano, Santa Felicola, Scornavacca, Torretta, Tortiano, Tre Fiumi, Tripoli

Government
  - Mayor: Luigi Buriola

Area
  - Total: 48.0 km^{2} (18.5 sq mi)
- Elevation: 128 m (420 ft)

Population (31 December 2014)
  - Total: 10,791
  - Density: 225/km^{2} (582/sq mi)
- Demonym: Montechiarugolesi
- Time zone: UTC+1 (CET)
  - Summer (DST): UTC+2 (CEST)
- Postal code: 43022
- Dialing code: 0521
- Patron saint: Saint Quentin
- Website: Official website

Montechiarugolo (Parmigiano: Monc'rùggol) is a comune (municipality) in the province of Parma in the administrative region of Emilia-Romagna in Italy, located about 80 kilometres (50 mi) northwest of Bologna and about 13 kilometres (8 mi) southeast of Parma.

Montechiarugolo borders the following municipalities: Montecchio Emilia, Parma, San Polo d'Enza, Sant'Ilario d'Enza, Traversetolo. It is one of I Borghi più belli d'Italia ("The most beautiful villages of Italy").

== Twin towns ==
- Izola, Slovenia

== See also ==
- County of Montechiarugolo
