= Lago Santo =

Lago Santo or Lake Santo may refer to:

- Santo Lake (Modena), Emilia-Romagna, Italy
- Santo Lake (Parma), Emilia-Romagna, Italy
