= Appennino Tosco-Emiliano National Park =

State-held natural preserve in Italy

Parco Nazionale Appennino Tosco-Emiliano
- IUCN category II (national park)
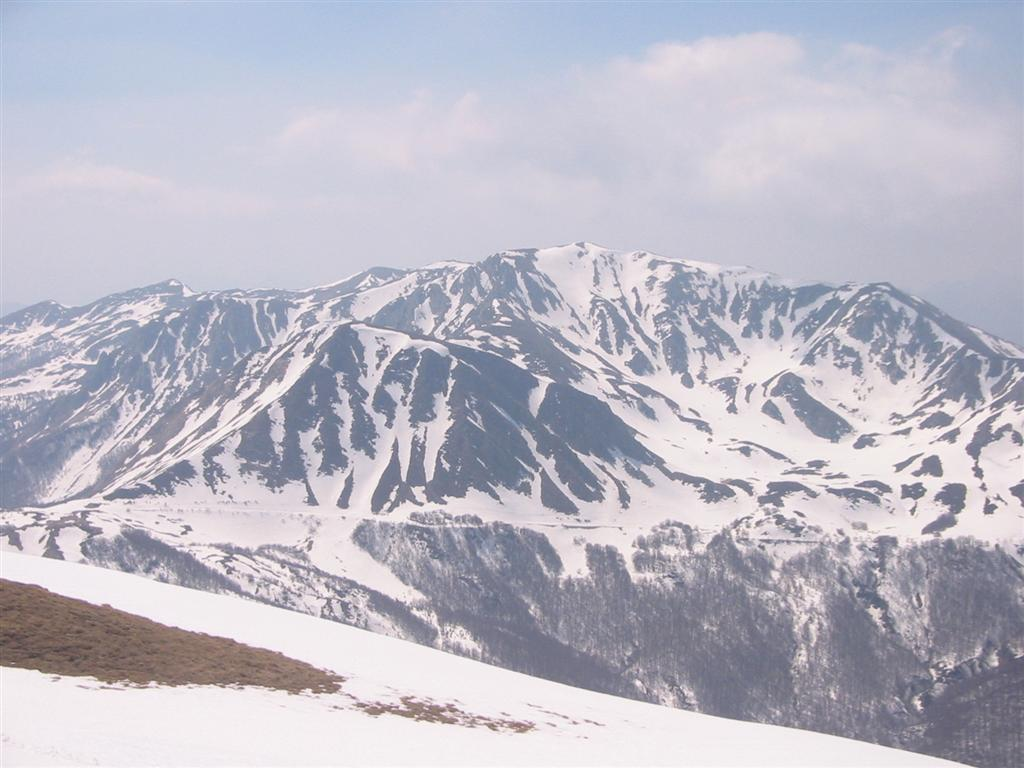
- Monte Prado in the park in winter

- Location within Italy
- Location: Emilia-Romagna, Tuscany
- Nearest city: La Spezia
- Coordinates: 44°19′06″N 10°14′26″E
- Area: 227.92 km^{2} (88.00 sq mi)
- Established: 2001
- Governing body: Ministero dell'Ambiente
- Website: www.parks.it/parco.nazionale.app.tosco.emil/Eindex.html

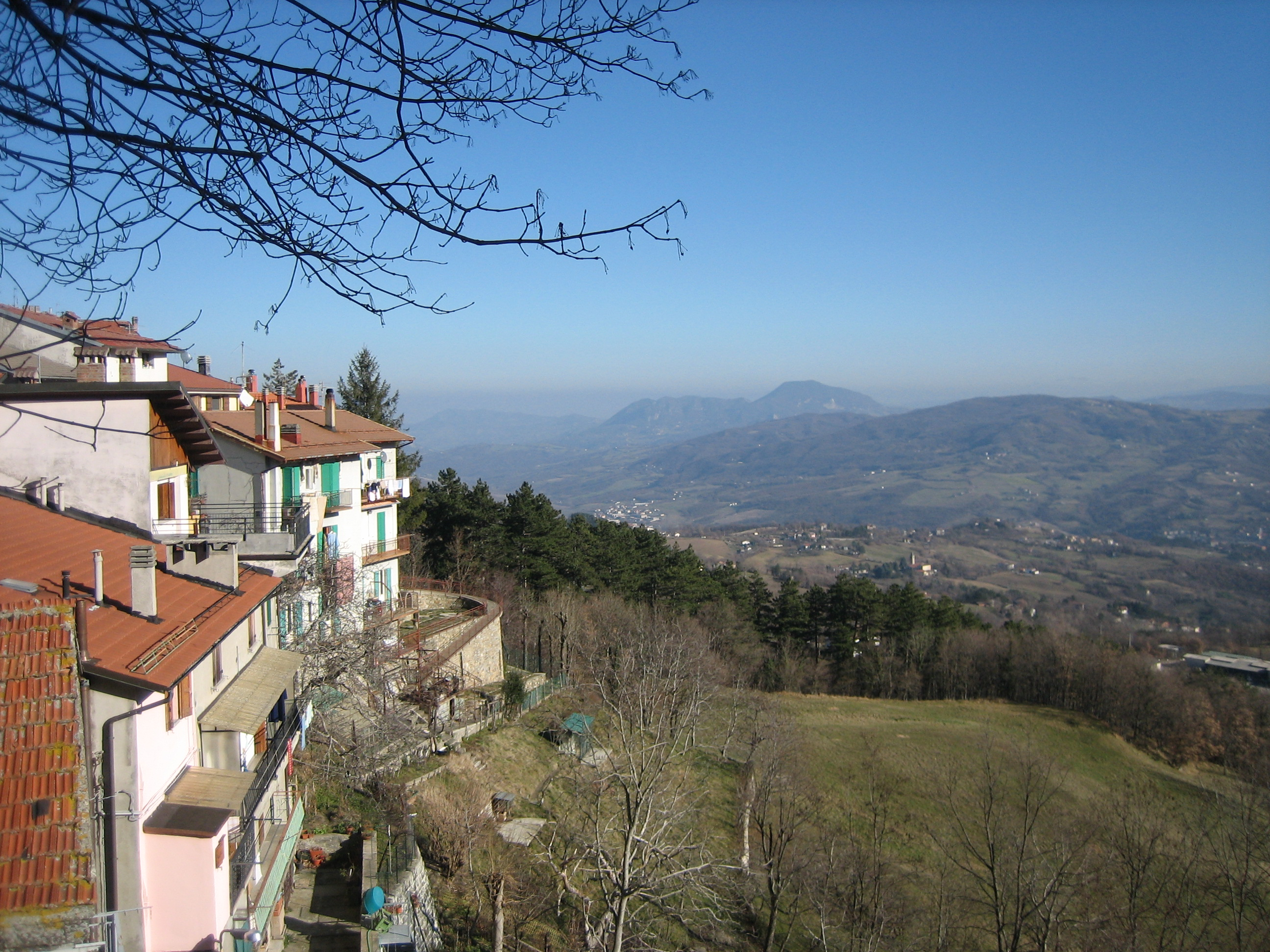
The Appennino Tosco-Emiliano in Castelluccio (Porretta Terme)

Appennino Tosco-Emiliano National Park is a state-held natural preserve in Northern and central Italy, located in the heart of an area noted for natural features and for the local quality products and handicrafts. It was founded in 2001, and is included in the provinces of Massa and Carrara, Lucca, Reggio Emilia and Parma.

== Geography ==
The Park territory includes the mountain area between Cisa and Forbici Passes. The forest ridges separate Tuscany from Emilia. The National Park is not far from the Cinque Terre and Foreste Casentinesi, Monte Falterona, Campigna National Parks.

The area is dominated by the summits of Alpe di Succiso, Monte Prado and Monte Cusna (over 2,121 m), lakes, and high-mountain grasslands. In Emilia, Pietra di Bismantova dominates the landscape with its vertical walls. Appennino Tosco Emiliano National Park has a wide range of environments (from grasslands to bilberry moorlands, to the most inaccessible summits. It includes lakes, waterfalls, streams that are enclosed by rocky walls. Wild animals like the italian wolf, the red deer, the european mouflon, the roe deer, the golden eagle, and many rare botanic species live in the Park.

== See also ==
- Filattiera
- Apennine deciduous montane forests
- Apennines
- National Parks of Italy
- Lake Pradaccio
- Lake Scuro Parmense

== Sources ==
- Yearbook of the Italian Parks 2005, edited by Comunicazione in association with Federparchi and the Italian State Tourism Board ISBN 88-7585-011-9
