= Alpe di Succiso =

Mountain in Italy

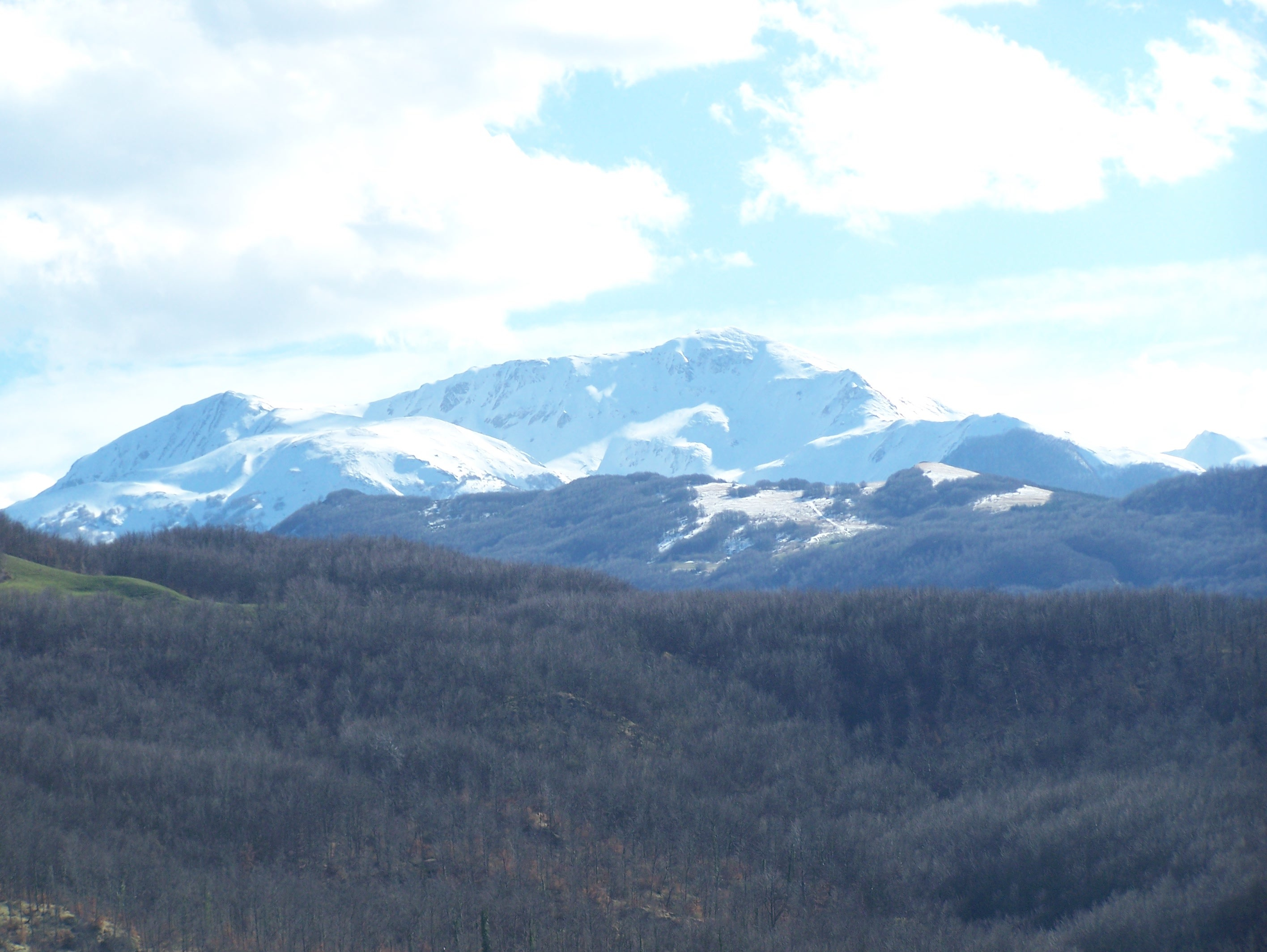
- Northern side of the Alpe di Succiso seen from the Valdenza.

Highest point
- Elevation: 2,017 m (6,617 ft)
- Prominence: 770 m (2,530 ft)
- Coordinates: 44°19′58″N 10°11′44″E

Geography
- Location within Italy
- Location: Province of Reggio Emilia, Italy
- Parent range: Tuscan-Emilian Apennines

The Alpe di Succiso (pronounced [ˈalpe di sutˈtʃiːzo]) is a mountain in the northern Apennines, located in the trait between the Cerreto and Lagastrello Passes, with an altitude of 2,017 m. It has a pyramidal appearance, carved by several gorges.

The rivers Secchia and Enza, right affluences of the Po River, have their source in the Alpe di Succiso.

The mountain is part of the National Park of the Appennino Tosco-Emiliano, and has "challenging" mountain hiking. There is a mountain hut for an overnight stay in Sarzana Mountain Hut at Mt. Acuto Lake; it has 25 beds, open only in July and August. There is also an emergency shelter, Rifugio Rio Pascolo.

== See also ==
- Conservation in Italy
