= Mezzani =

- Comune
- Comune di Mezzani
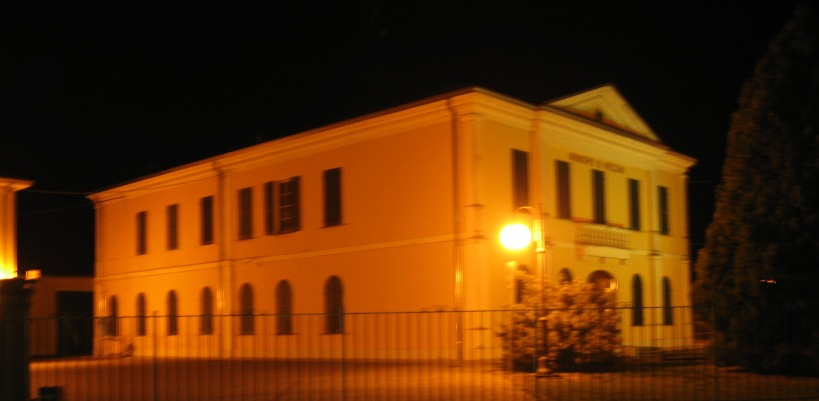
- Town hall by night

- Location within Italy Location within Emilia-Romagna
- Coordinates: 44°55′N 10°26′E
- Country: Italy
- Region: Emilia-Romagna
- Province: Parma (PR)
- Frazioni: Bocca d'Enza, Casale, Ghiare Bonvisi, Mezzano Inferiore, Mezzano Rondani, Mezzano Superiore, Valle

Government
  - Mayor: Romeo Azzali

Area
  - Total: 28.6 km^{2} (11.0 sq mi)
- Elevation: 26 m (85 ft)

Population (31 October 2017)
  - Total: 3,231
  - Density: 113/km^{2} (293/sq mi)
- Demonym: Mezzanesi
- Time zone: UTC+1 (CET)
  - Summer (DST): UTC+2 (CEST)
- Postal code: 43055
- Dialing code: 0521
- Website: Official website

Mezzani (Parmigiano: Amzan or Mzan, IPA: [(a)mˈzaŋ]) is a comune (municipality) in the Province of Parma in the Italian region Emilia-Romagna, located about 90 kilometres (56 mi) northwest of Bologna and about 15 kilometres (9 mi) northeast of Parma. The principal centres of the municipality are Casale, Mezzano Rondani, Mezzano Inferiore, Mezzano Superiore, whereas Bocca d’Enza, Ghiare Bonvisi, Valle are only hamlets. Mezzani borders the following municipalities: Brescello, Casalmaggiore, Colorno, Parma, Sorbolo, Torrile, Viadana.

== Geography ==
Mezzani lies on the northeastern end of the province of Parma, in the middle of Po Valley and borders with three provinces: Reggio Emilia, Mantua, Cremona.

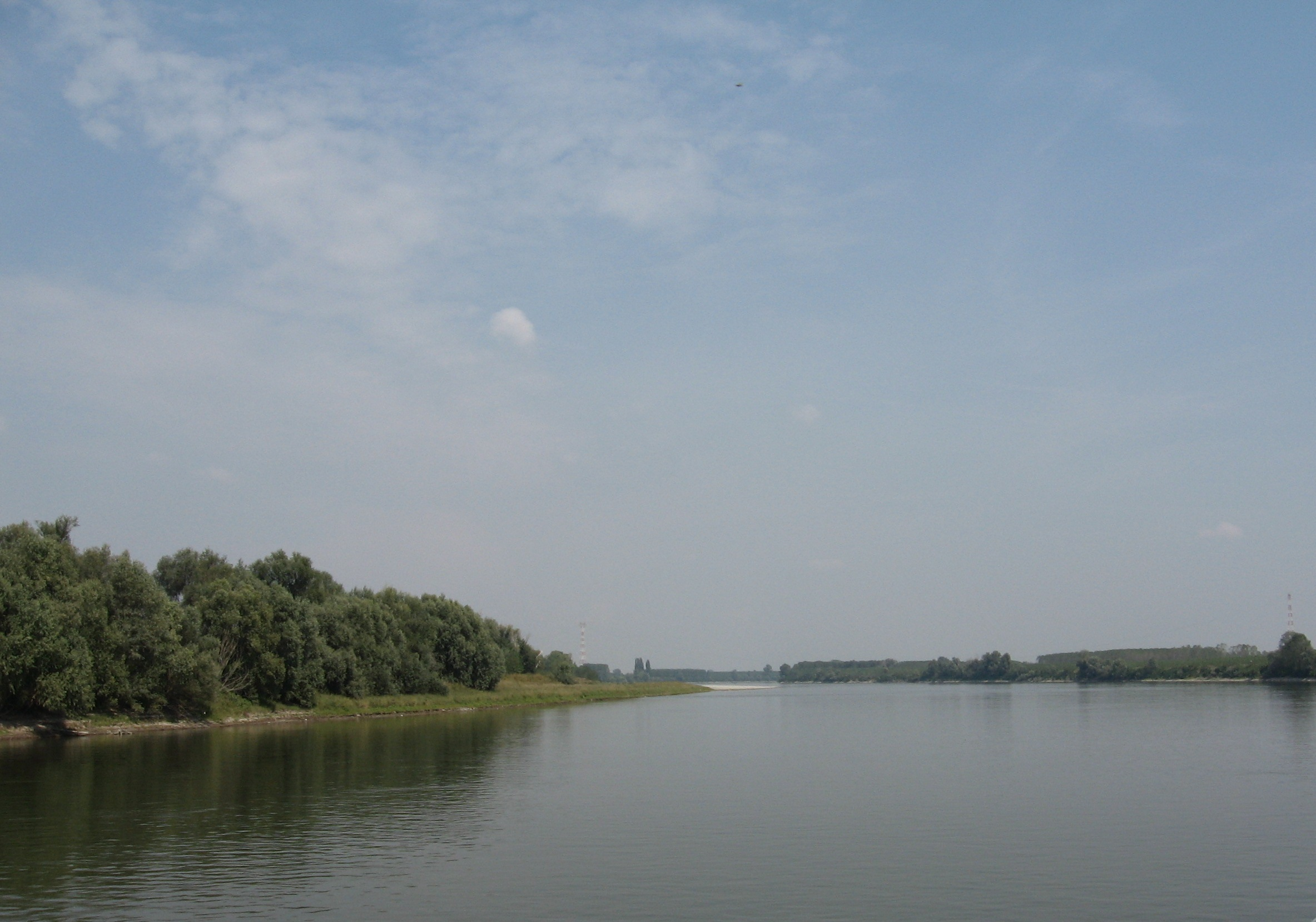
Po River near Mezzani

Located on the right shore of the Po River, the municipal territory is crossed by others watercourses too: the torrent Parma on the west, that flows into Po near Mezzano Superiore, the torrent Enza that follows for some kilometres the eastern border with the Reggio Emilia, the Parmetta canal southwards of Mezzano Inferiore and the Parma morta abandoned riverbed of Parma torrent that up to the first years of 19th century flowed into Enza.

Mezzani is located in the lowest area of Po Valley called Bassa.

== History ==
The toponym Mezzani comes from Latin word medianus, meaning "in the middle of", once used to name islands on river Po. This territory originated largely from these islands in medieval times and it was continuously reshaped from river waters. Therefore signs of ancient settlements were not found here, but not far from municipality’s boundaries in Cogozzo not far from Viadana and near Coenzo were found traces of two Bronze Age villages called terramare. The southern part of the territory still shows the signs of Roman centuriation.

Casale, the oldest inhabited centre, was founded on a river island; in 890 it was defined as "insula iuxta Padum" (island near Po) to become some century later "Casalis Ripae Padi" (that means Casale near Po riverside) because the river moved northwards. The ancient river presence is testified from the toponym Valle (hollow) located southwards.

Since their formation as islands of Po river, Mezzano Inferiore and Superiore where possession of Parma's Bishop. Some ancient documents talk about alluvial lands near river Po owned from the Bishop after concession of Holy Roman Emperors Charles III the Fat in 973 and Henry VI in 1195. Abbot Giovanni Romani mentioned an event which happened near the "Mezzano del Vescovo" in 1131. The above-mentioned centres originated in different periods: the first one was Mezzano Superiore, the other certainly after 1306. Mezzano Inferiore become autonomous from Mezzano Superiore in the early 16th century with the construction of a parochial church, rebuilt in 1563 and finished in 1779.

Mezzano Rondani was founded on the Lombard bank of Po. After a big flood that interested the area from Casalmaggiore to Fossacaprara and moved northwards the river course, the place became an island and then was joined to Parmesan bank. The word Rondani comes from the surname of a rich family owner of many possessions in that area.

Mezzano Rondani and Casale were parts of the Duchy of Parma, while Mezzano Inferiore and Superiore were since the origins fiefs of the bishops of Parma, and for that reason their ancient names had the suffix del Vescovo (of the Bishop). They formed an independent state, where the Bishop had also his palace and a garrison.

It was always a rural district, but due to its closeness to Lombard and the Modenese states was also interested from smuggling. In various times it became a battlefield: a field is still called "Turkish cemetery" because in it were buried the corpses of Turkish mercenaries that fought for the Republic of Venice against the Duchy of Milan. In 1634 the Germans stationed in Castelnovo di Sotto raided and burned the church of Mezzano Inferiore and devastated the village. Some old memoirs talk about the battle of Colorno of 1734 for Mantua succession but in fact it took place in Mezzano Inferiore: some cannonballs still lie on the bell tower.

After various attempts in 1763 the dukes of Parma succeeded in forcing Parma’s Bishop to renounce his possessions in Mezzani. With this act the two villages passed under the jurisdiction of the duchy of Parma. The loss of autonomy and privileges granted till that event, the new taxes introduced from Parma caused a revolt against duke Filippo Borbone. The duke repressed the rebellion by sending his dragoons that burned 75 houses and confiscated the properties of 75 families.

In 1861 Mezzani with Duchy of Parma became part of the Kingdom of Italy.

Mezzani was decorated with the Bronze Medal for Military Valour for its participation in the Italian resistance movement during World War II.

== Main sights ==
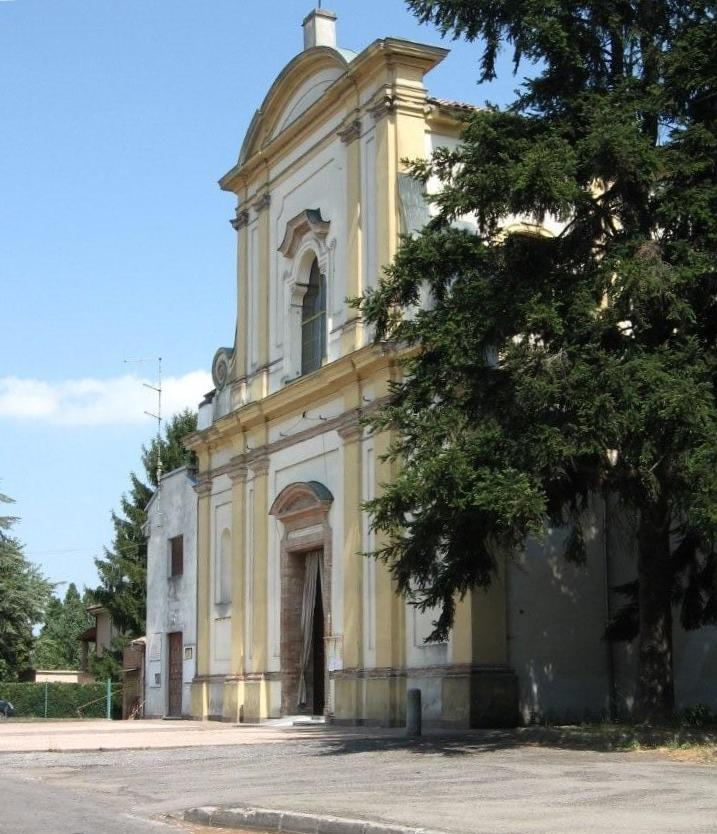
Mezzano Inferiore's church

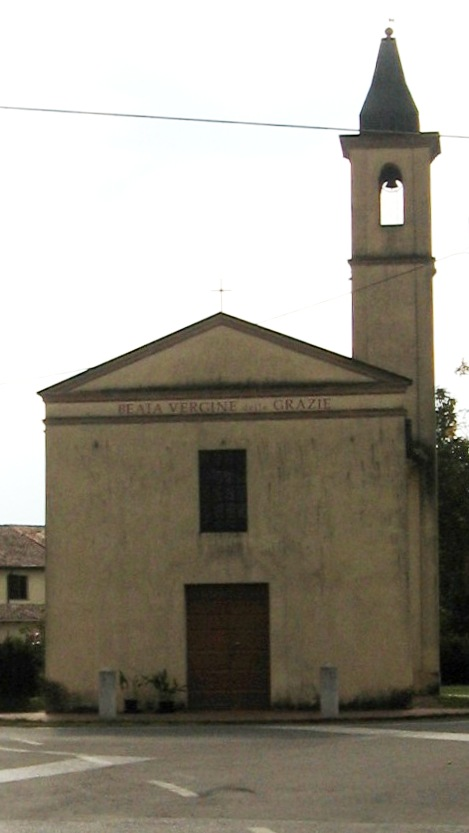
Borghetto oratory in Mezzano Inferiore

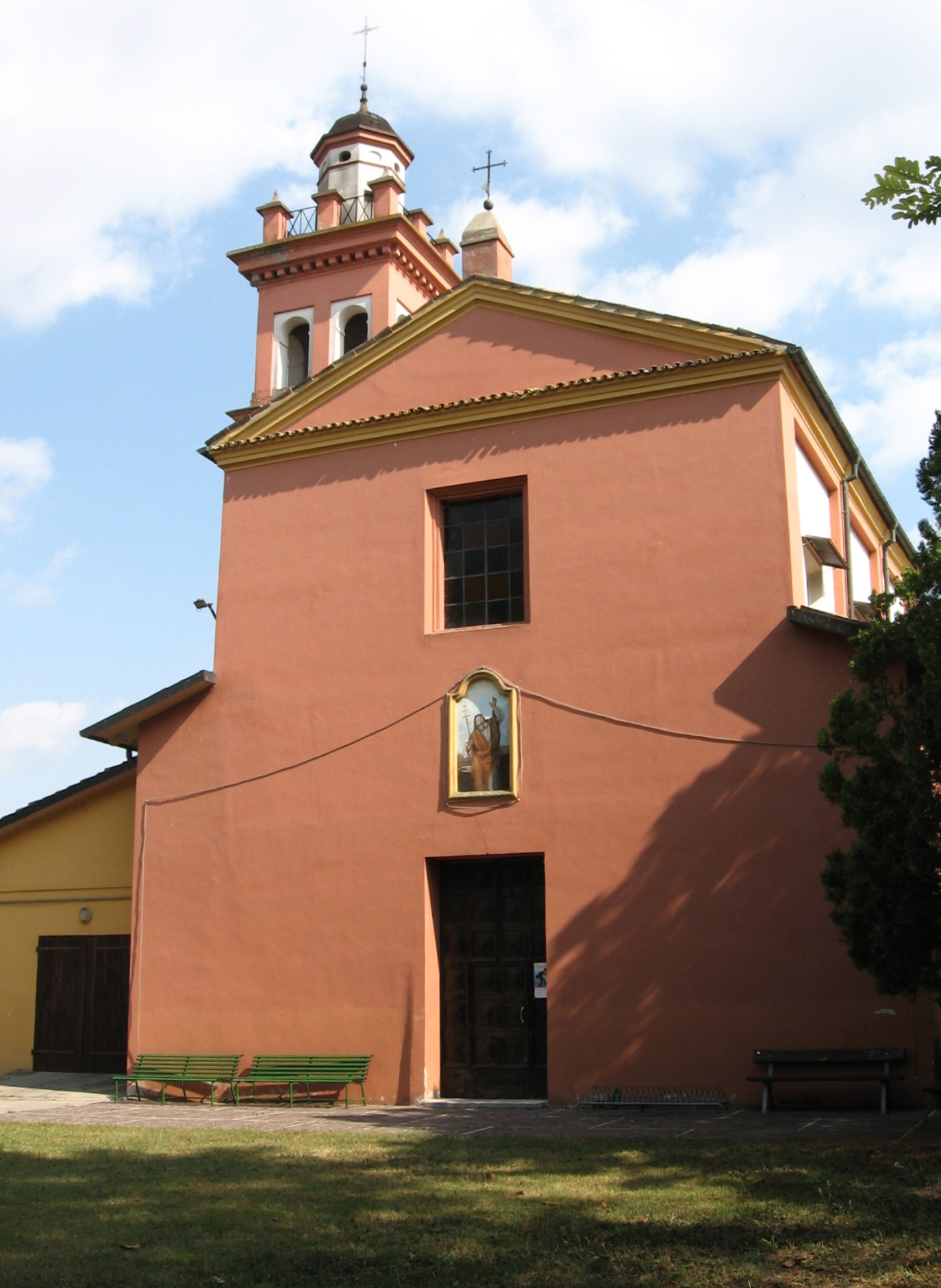
Casale's church

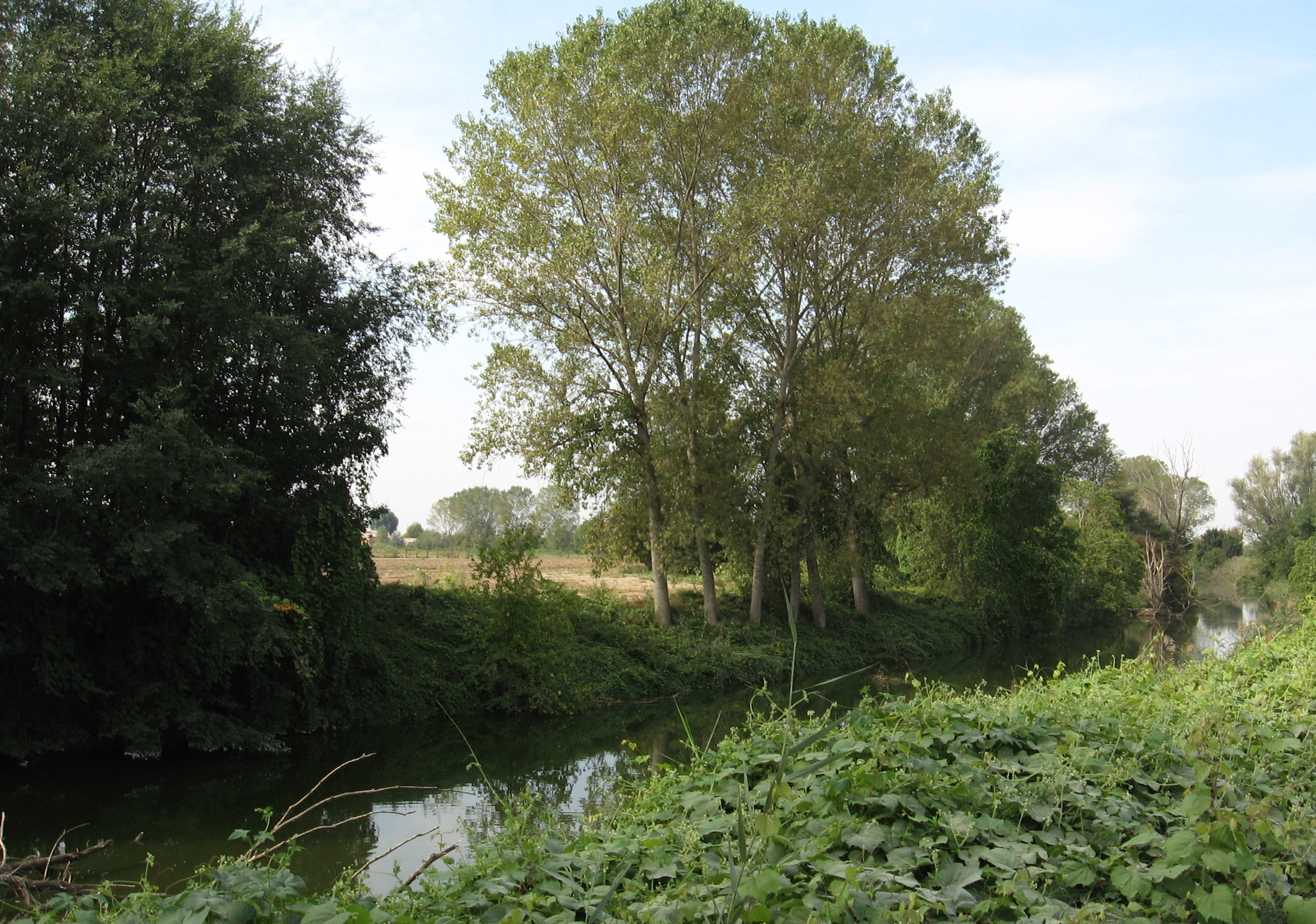
View of Parma Morta oriented reserve

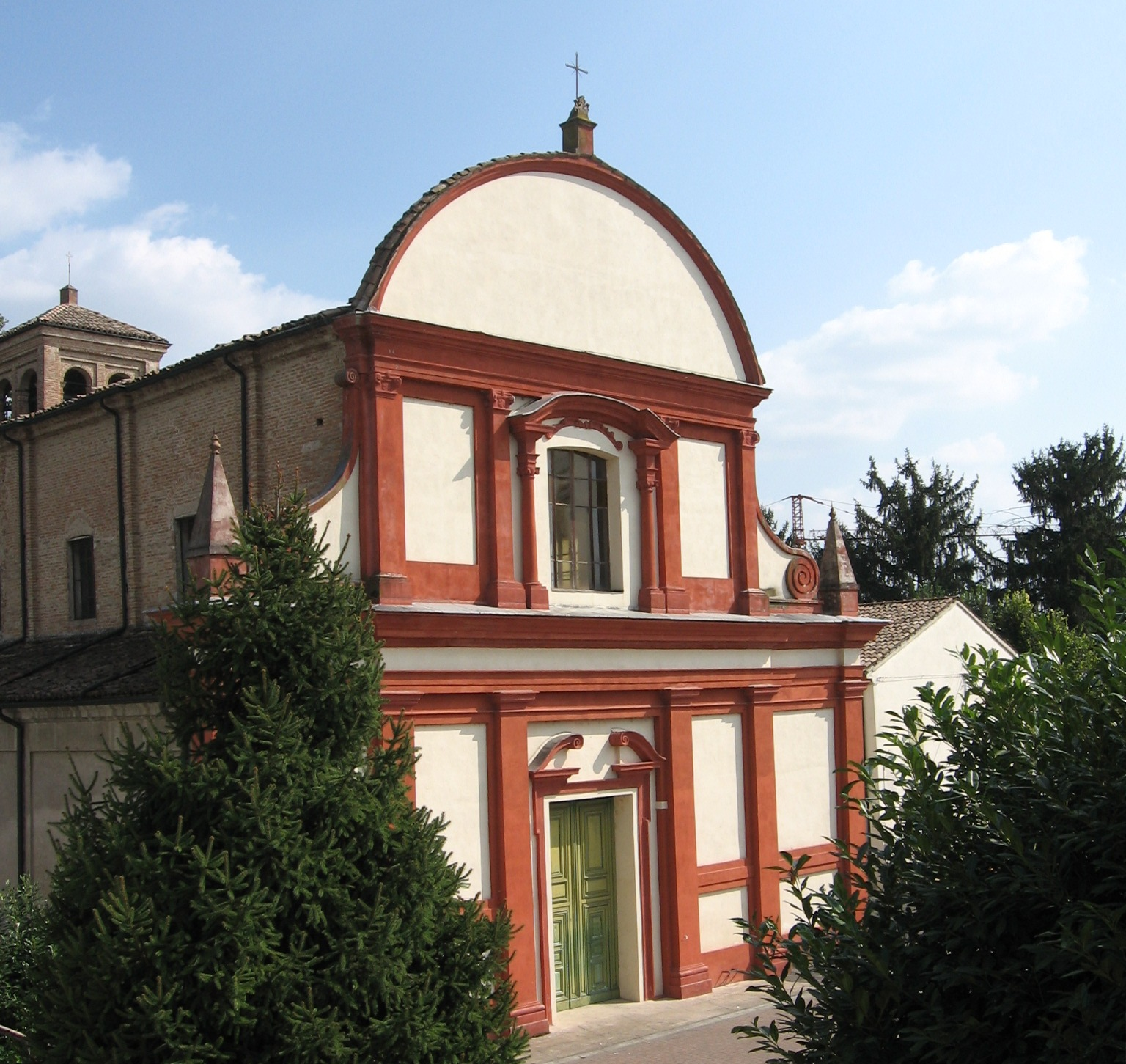
Mezzano Superiore's church

=== Churches ===
- S. Maria nascente (in Mezzano Inferiore)

The parish church of Mezzano Inferiore was built a first time in 1563 and then rebuilt between 1754 and 1779 on a plan of Bettoli on the same foundation. Inside there is an organ of Giovanni and Stefano Cavalletti of 1829 and a characteristic high altar in inlaid marble (1799).

- Beata Vergine delle Grazie (or Borghetto oratory) (in Mezzano Inferiore) This oratory has a rectangular plan with concave moulding and bell tower with cusp roof. In the interior the vault is with crossed webs.
- S. Silvestro (in Casale) Appears in the bull of Lucius II of March 1144, as a property of the monastery of Saint Giovanni: “Ecclesia Sancti Silvestri de insula". Afterwards it was reconstructed on the same place; today still remain some traces of the old medieval church.
- S. Michele (in Mezzano Superiore) The first church was built in the 12th century, as testify the apsidal foundations. It was probably reconstructed in 1479, year of consecration of Bishop Sagramoro Sagramori, and relocated frontward. The bell tower was raised in 1664 from its massive Renaissance structure. The front style shows an origin datable at the end of the 17th century.

=== Other buildings ===
- Bishop's palace (in Mezzano Superiore). Now a private property, it was never finished, but according to some drawings of the 16th century it was to become magnificent.

=== Nature ===
- Oriented reserve Parma Morta. It is located around the old course of Parma river. Here can be found the typical vegetation of stagnant waters; shrubby and forest vegetation consists of hygrophilous shrubs of willow and alder and mesophyll woods of oak, maple, cornel, wild cherry and elm. The nesting birdlife can be divided in species that prefer the reed thicket and those linked to the residual arboreal riparian strip.
- Aquarium. In the reserve is an interesting didactic aquarium containing the river ichthyic species more typical: carps, tenches, perches, catfishes, sturgeons, crayfishes are only some of the species that can be observed and experience.

== People ==
- Clemente Bondi, poet and translator
- Giuseppe Rondizzoni, general
- Rino Vernizzi, musician
