= Santo Lake (Parma) =

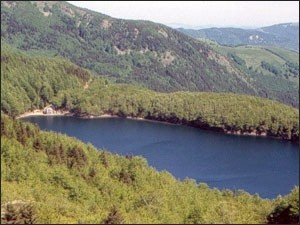
- Image taken from mount Marmagna

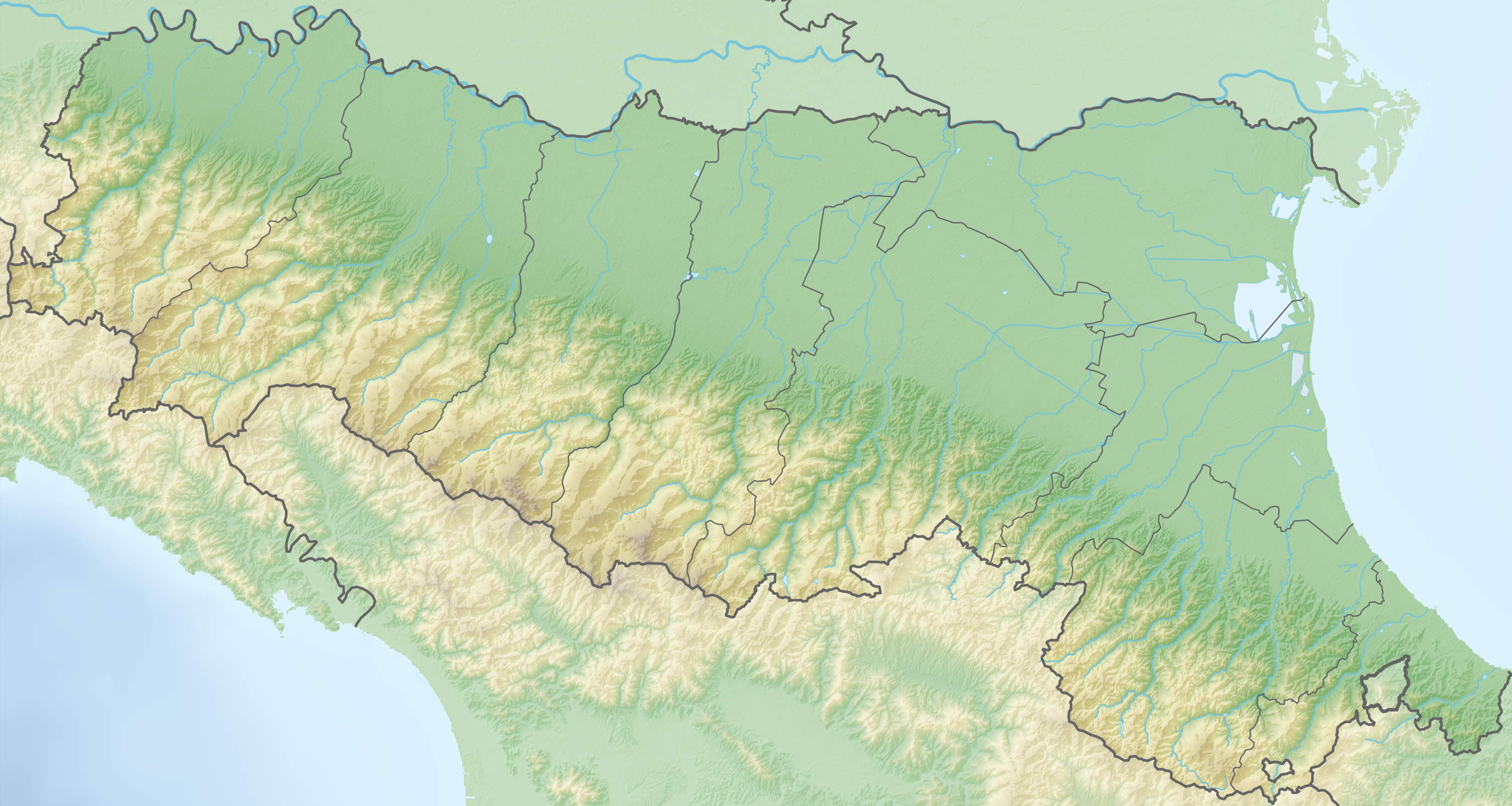
- Location within Emilia-Romagna
- Location: Province of Parma, Emilia-Romagna
- Coordinates: 44°24′07″N 10°00′25″E
- Type: glacial lake
- Primary outflows: Parma di Lago Santo
- Basin countries: Italy
- Max. length: 430 m (1,410 ft)
- Max. width: 220 m (720 ft)
- Surface area: 0.0815 km^{2} (0.0315 sq mi)
- Max. depth: 22.5 m (74 ft)
- Shore length^{1}: 1.2 km (0.75 mi)
- Surface elevation: 1,507 m (4,944 ft)
- Frozen: Usually in January and February. Thickness from few cm up to 1 m.
- ^{1} Shore length is not a well-defined measure.

Santo Lake (Italian: Lago Santo parmense) is a lake in the Province of Parma, Emilia-Romagna, Italy. At an elevation of 1,507 m, its surface area is 81,550 m² (0.0815 km²).

The outflow is the small river Parma di Lago Santo. After about 4 km it join with Parma di Badignana and the river then takes the name of Parma.
