= Secchia =

Italian river

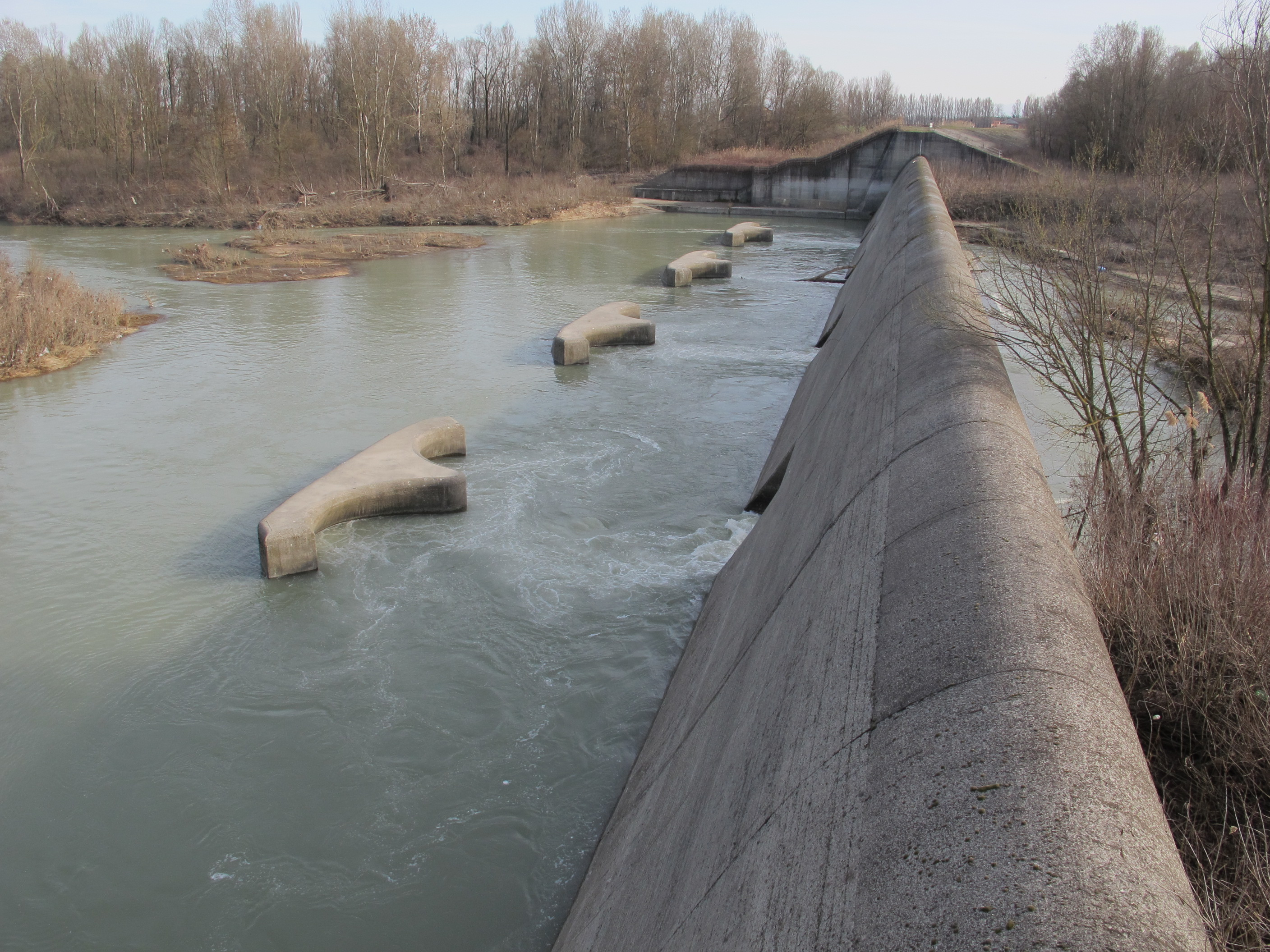
- Dam on the Secchia near Campogalliano.

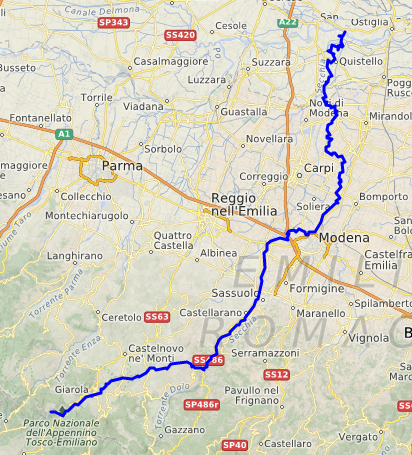

Location
- Country: Italy

Physical characteristics
- Source
  - location: Tuscan-Emilian Apennines, Alpe di Succiso
  - elevation: 2,017 m (6,617 ft)
- Mouth
  - location: Po, south of Mantua
  - coordinates: 45.0624°N 11.0057°E
- Length: 172 km (107 mi)
- Basin size: 2,292 km^{2} (885 mi^{2})
- Discharge
  - average: 42 m^{3}/s (1,500 cu ft/s)

Basin features
- Progression: Po→ Adriatic Sea

The Secchia (pronounced [ˈsekkja]; Emilian: Sècia; called by Pliny Gabellus) is an Italian river. One of the main right bank tributaries of the Po, it flows through the Emilia-Romagna region in northern Italy.

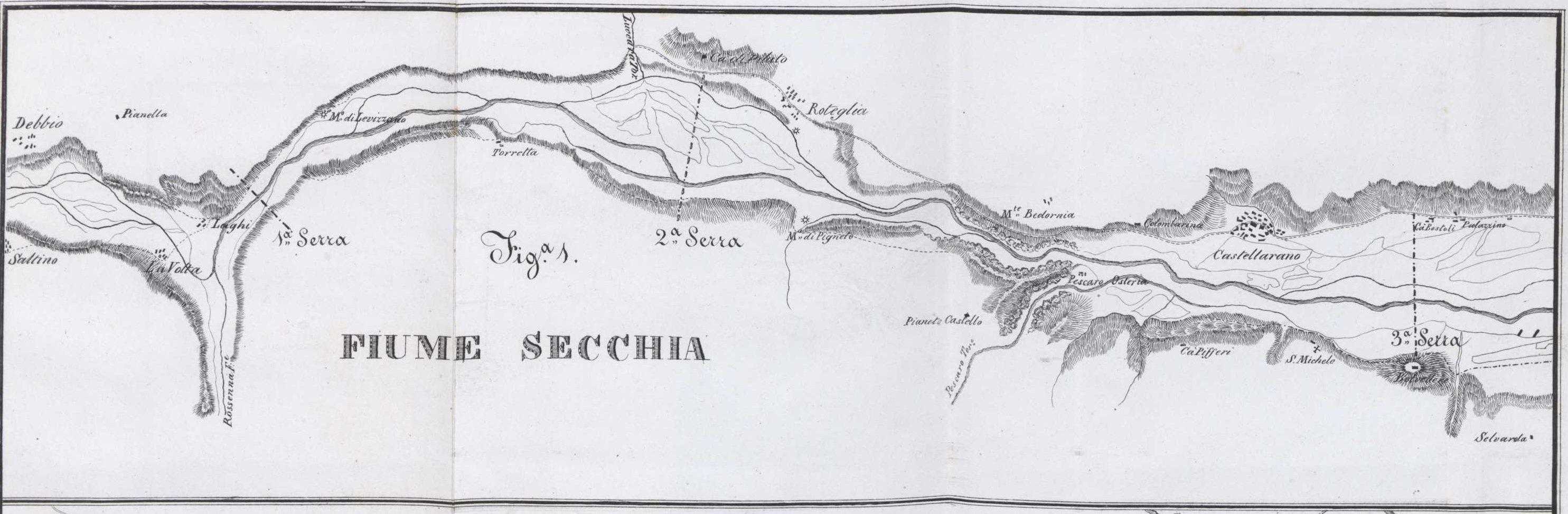
The Secchia in an 1847 map

It is 172 kilometres (107 mi) long, and has a drainage basin with a catchment area of 2,292 square kilometres (885 mi^{2}), alternating between aridity in the dry summer months and higher flows during the wet spring and autumn periods. It originates at Alpe di Succiso at an elevation of 2,017 metres (6,617 ft), close to the pass of Cerreto in the Tuscan-Emilian Apennines, then it heads north, touching on the territory of Frignano, passing into the territory of the commune of Pavullo nel Frignano and reaching the Po Valley close to Sassuolo (in the province of Modena). Here it touches on the city of Modena and, with its riverbank protected by embankments, runs into the Po just south of Mantua, close to the mouth of the Mincio.
