= Enzo Muccetti =

Enzo Muccetti (born 29 June 1912 in Corfinio; died 24 March 1977 in Parma) was a great Italian bassoonist and pedagogue. He studied at the Giuseppe Verdi Conservatory in Turin, originally with the intention of learning the cello but shifting to the bassoon which was more suited to his small hands. Although he started out with the Buffet system, he switched to the German system. His work improving the mechanics of the bassoon was readily accepted by Heckel, which eventually designed and dedicated a special model of bassoon to him, "Model 41, Special E.M." Heckel built bassoons with three different styles of bells, one of which, the Muccetti bell (also known as the Italian bell), was named after him. He served as principal bassoonist at La Scala from 1947 to 1971. After conducting a La Scala concert, Paul Hindemith wrote in his programme "if all bassoonists were so marvelous, life, and especially writing for the bassoon, would be more of a joy than it usually is." Similarly, Herbert von Karajan wrote after a series of concerts at La Scala, "I'm pleased to have found a bassoonist of such stature that in almost all European orchestras there is no one to be compared with you." Muccetti was a professor at the Parma Conservatory, where his students included Evandro Dall'Oca (his eventual successor at La Scala), Rino Vernizzi (former principal bassoonist in Orchestra dell'Accademia di Santa Cecilia), Luca Reverberi, (Romano Santi, Michael Chapman and Wendy Philips.
