= Lake Scuro Parmense =

Glacial lake in Emilia-Romagna, Italy

Lake Scuro parmense
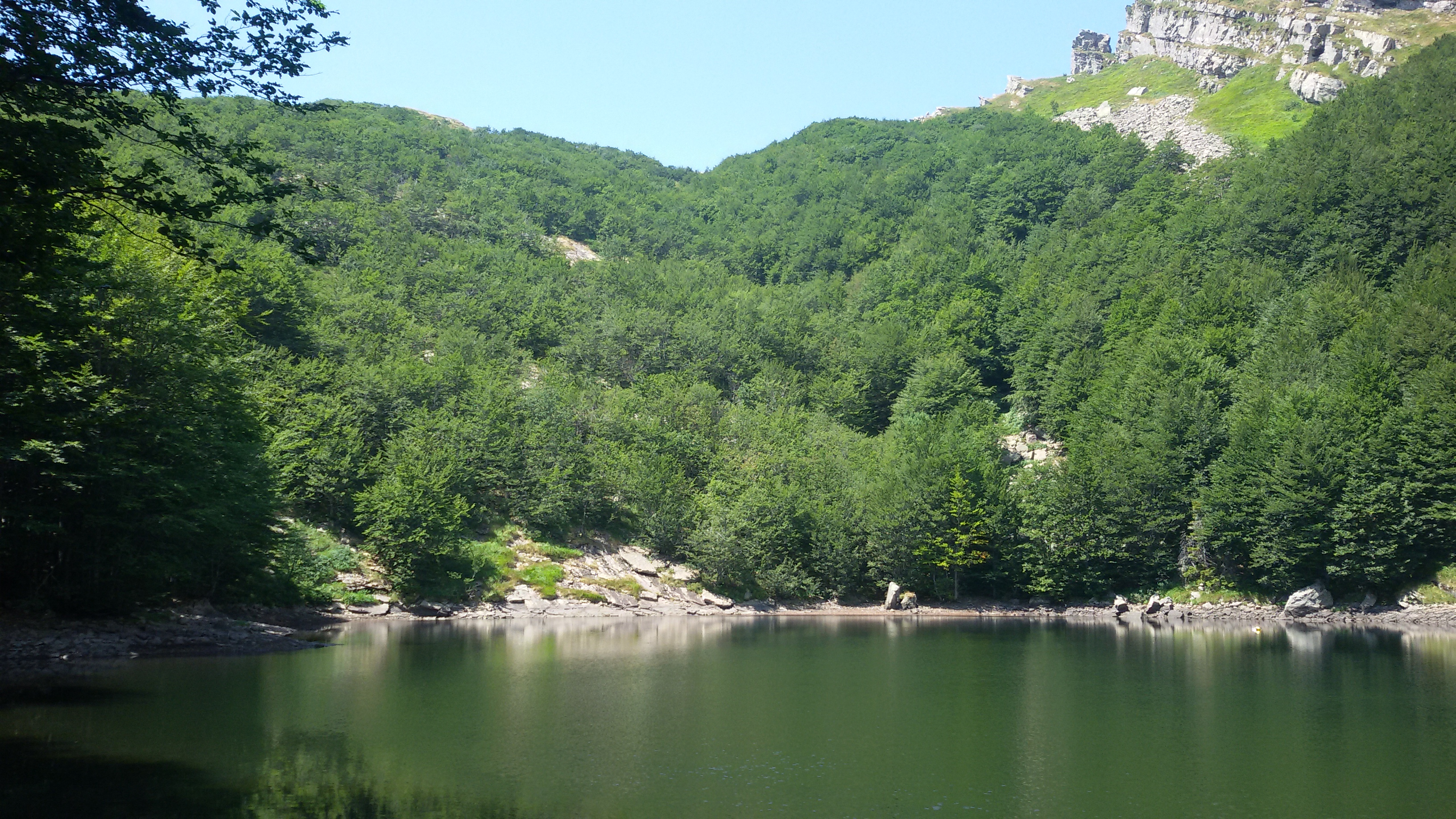
- Interactive map of Lake Scuro parmense
- Location: Corniglio, Province of Parma, Emilia-Romagna, Italy
- Coordinates: 44.382°N 10.045°E
- Type: Glacial
- Basin countries: Italy
- Surface area: 0.01160 km^{2} (0.00448 sq mi)
- Max. depth: 10.4 m (34 ft)
- Surface elevation: 1,527 m (5,010 ft)

The Lake Scuro parmense is a natural glacial lake located above the Lagoni valley in the Province of Parma, with an area of 11,600 m^{2} and a maximum depth of 10.4 m.

== Geography ==
The lake, situated at 1,527 meters altitude in the municipality of Corniglio, is located in the western part of the Appennino Tosco-Emiliano National Park and is also part of the Parco regionale dei Cento Laghi. It is set in a glacial cirque dominated just to the south by Monte Scala (1,717 m a.s.l.) which separates the Lagoni valley from the Badignana valley, both within the Parma area.

Of mixed origin, partly morainic and partly due to exaration, it extends over a maximum length of 130 m with a width reaching 100 m. The lake has no inflows and is thus fed only by groundwater contributions; this causes significant variation in the lake’s size, so it is not uncommon for the water level to be lower than the start of the outflow, named Rio Lago Scuro, which consequently remains dry for long periods.

== Fauna ==
The fauna is predominantly composed of small crustaceans, among which the Daphnia longispina and the Eudiaptomus intermedius are noteworthy.

Research indicates that fish were entirely absent until the mid-1980s, while recently, brown trout have been found in the lake’s waters, most likely introduced by humans.

== Access ==
The lake is reachable from the Rifugio Lagoni (located at 1,350 meters, about 13 km from Corniglio, equipped with a restaurant and parking) on foot by following trail 711, which starts from the right bank of the Lago Gemio Inferiore. The trail ascends through the beech forest to a fork, where turning right leads to trail 715, which reaches Lake Scuro in a few minutes.

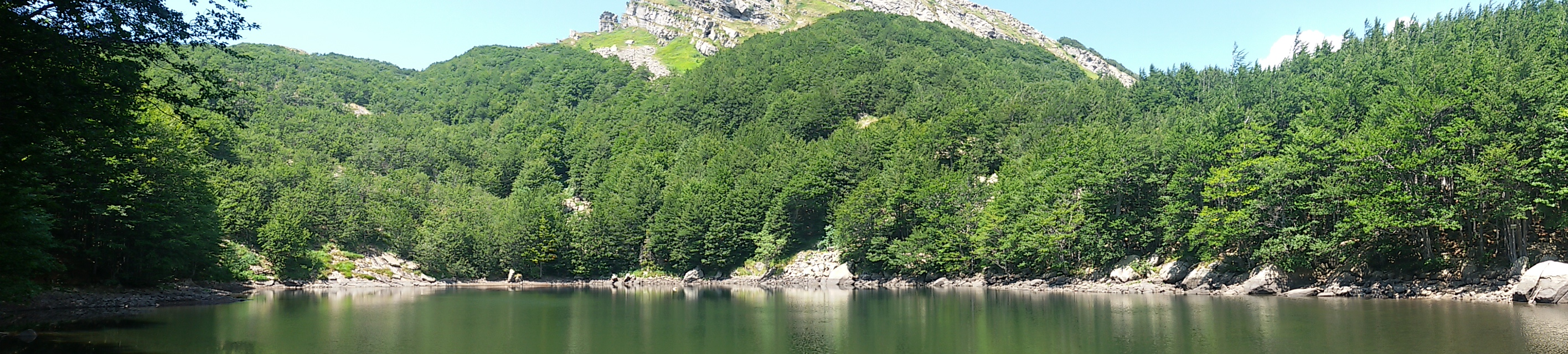
Panoramic view of Lake Scuro parmense, with Monte Scala in the background
