= Riserva naturale orientata Parma Morta =

Natural Reserve in Italy

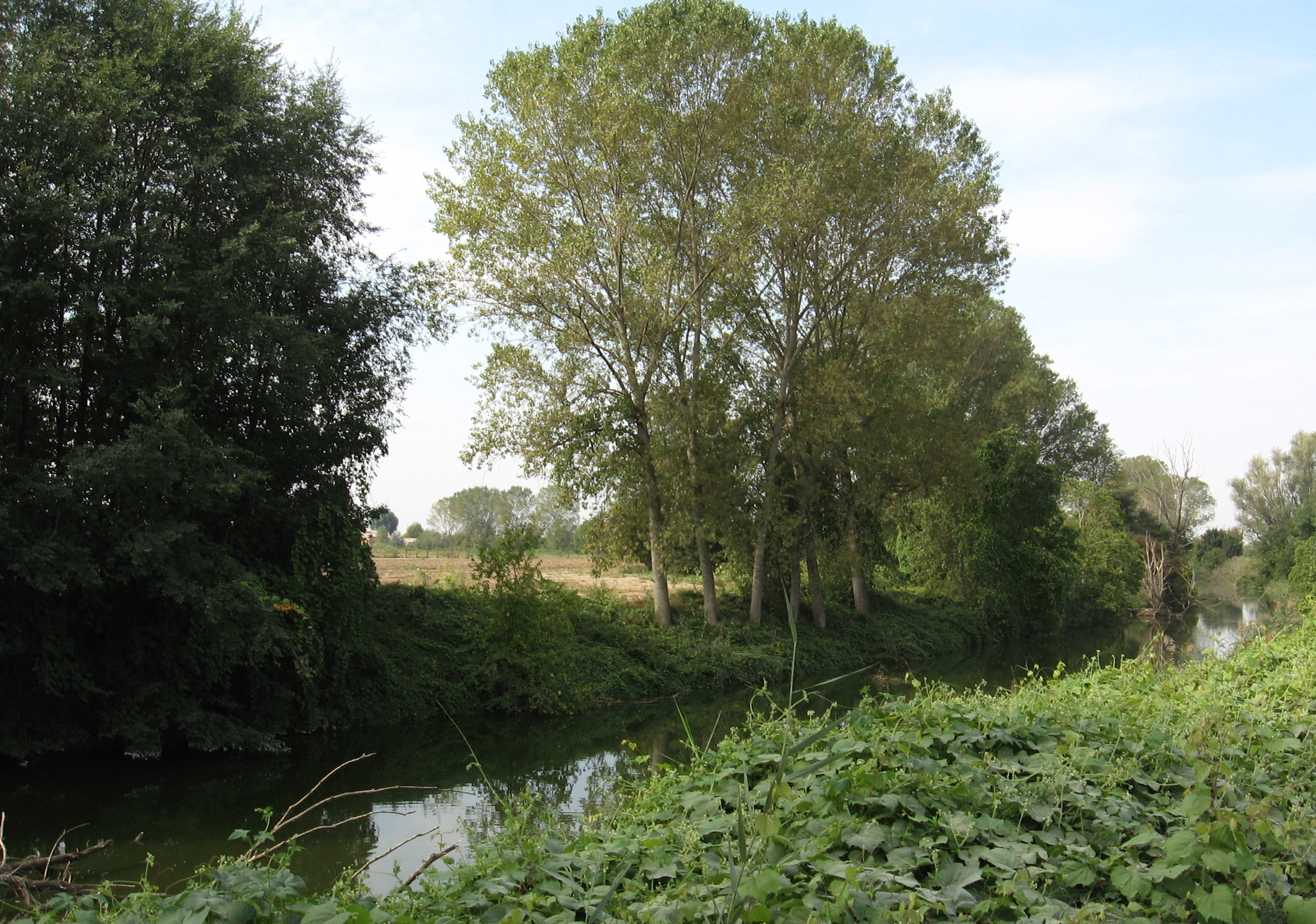
- Interactive map of Riserva naturale orientata Parma Morta
- Location: Mezzani, Province of Parma, Italy
- Nearest city: Parma
- Coordinates: 44°55′24″N 10°27′48″E
- Area: 6,451 ha (15,941 acres)
- Established: 1990
- Website: www.regione.emilia-romagna.it/wcm/natura2000/siti/it4020025/caratteristiche.htm

The Natural Reserve Parma Morta is located in Emilia-Romagna in the commune of Mezzani (Province of Parma), and was established in 1990.

== Territory ==
Situated between the mouths of rivers Parma and Enza it includes a strip of territory of about 5 kilometres (3 mi) long and covers an area of 6,451 hectares (15,940 acres) along a wetland called Parma Morta. In this place flowed once the river Parma. Until 1870, it flowed into the Enza, and then his course was diverted to flow directly into the river Po.

The water stagnating here comes from Enza and go back along the inactive river branch up to half a mile from the today's course of Parma.

To assure to the area a constant level of water necessary to maintain the ecosystem, was created a phytodepurating system that ensure a constant input of water from surrounding canals.

== Flora ==
Along the old river course can be found plants like carex and other semi-aquatic plants, shrubs of Glossy Buckthorn, black alder and groves of elm, field maple and pedunculate oak.

In the reserve grows some particular plants as the Summer Snowflake (Leucojum aestivum), the 'Four Leaf Clover' (Marsilea quadrifolia). The rarest one is the Utricularia vulgaris, a rootless aquatic carnivorous plant who capture small insects and in summer shows beautiful yellow flowers sprouting from water.

== Fauna ==
This area gives shelter to many species of animals coming from the surrounding cultivated fields. Is an important refuge for amphibians, reptiles and birds; here nests some of the target species of the Birds Directive of the European Community. The reserve is one of the six areas designated as Natura 2000 sites belonging to the project Life+ "Pianura Parmense" and is one of the last wetlands remained in a very anthropized area.
