= Rino Vernizzi =

Italian bassoonist (1946–2022)

- Born: 15 November 1946; Mezzano Inferiore, Italy
- Died: 16 June 2022 (aged 75)
- Genres: Classical music, jazz
- Occupation: Musician
- Instruments: Bassoon, piano, flute

Rino Vernizzi (15 November 1946 – 16 June 2022) was an Italian bassoonist.

== Biography ==
Rino Vernizzi was born in Mezzano Inferiore, Italy. He graduated in bassoon at Parma Conservatory with Enzo Muccetti in 1967, then later gave himself up to the improvement of the piano with Paolo Cavazzini showing his interest since early career in jazz music, then abandoned to devote himself to the world of Symphony Orchestras.

== Career ==
Vernizzi won many competitions, he played with several of the major Italian orchestras and for many years was the first bassoon of the Orchestra dell'Accademia Nazionale di Santa Cecilia in Rome. As a soloist he collaborated with conductors such as Giuseppe Sinopoli, Carlo Maria Giulini, Kurt Masur, Neville Marriner, Daniel Oren, and Daniele Gatti. He toured all over the world.

Vernizzi’s goal was always to explore the entire spectrum of music, not just the thread of classic European one, but also engaging, especially during the last decade, in other musical genres, particularly in jazz.

CDs recorded with his quartet: Etnoart Jazz Bassoon, Goldberg Jazz, Play Bach Paganini, Baby Boom, The quartet seasons, Storie di tango, Jazz Piano Trio, and Play Pixinguinha were greatly appreciated by the critics.

== Discography ==
- Goldberg Jazz – Play Bach, Play Paganini, Rino Vernizzi, Vernizzi Jazz Quartet, Arts.
- Baby Boom, Rino Vernizzi, Vernizzi Jazz Quartet, Italy.
- Bassoon XX (concert of Sofia Gubaidulina, Jean Françaix, André Jolivet etc.), Rino Vernizzi, Antonio Plotino, Arts.

== Bibliography ==
- Simone Tarsitani (2005), "Intervista: Rino Vernizzi", I Fiati, Rome
