= Parma (river) =

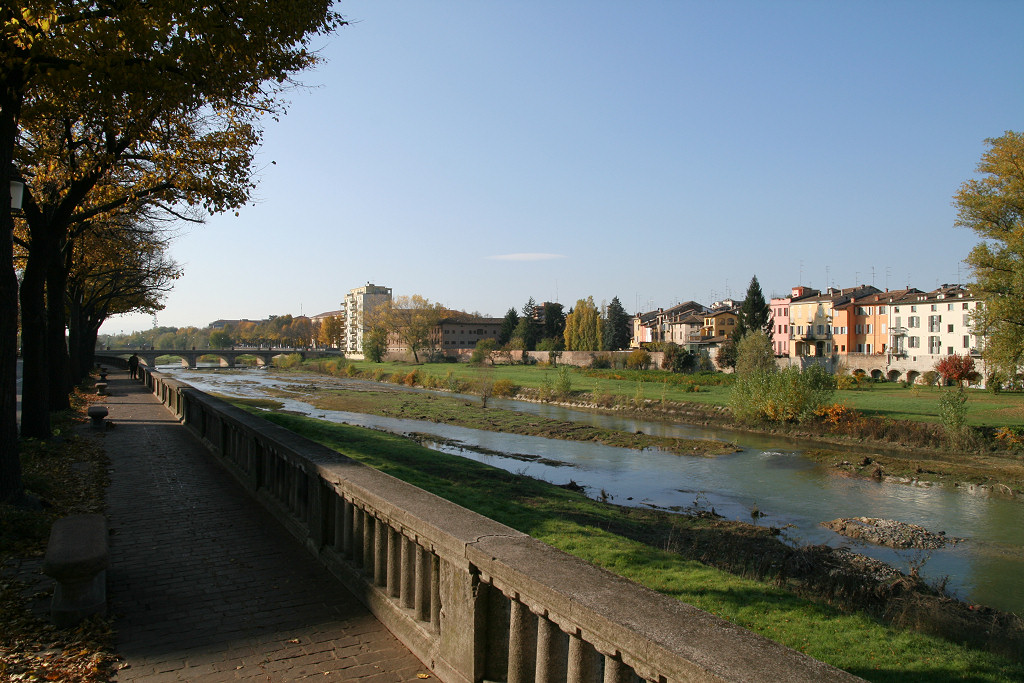
- Parma: Lungoparma

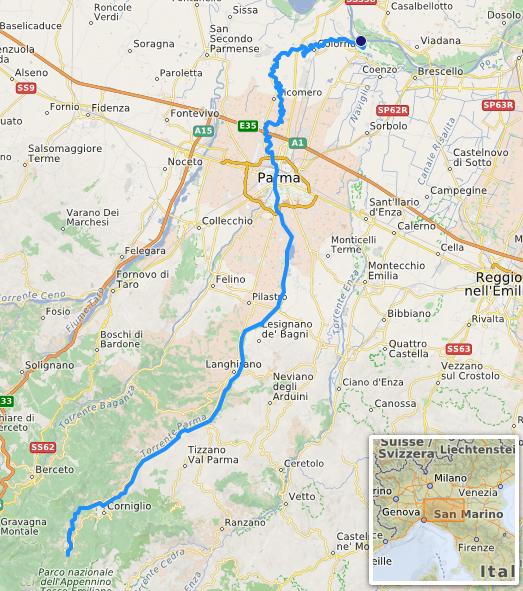
- Course of the Parma

Location
- Country: Italy

Physical characteristics
- Source
  - location: Tuscan-Emilian Apennines, Monte Marmagna
  - elevation: about 1,852 m (6,076 ft)
- Mouth
  - location: Po near Mezzani (PR)
  - coordinates: 44°56′06″N 10°26′28″E
- Length: 92 km (57 mi)
- Basin size: 796 km^{2} (307 mi^{2})
- Discharge
  - average: mean value 11.3 m^{3}/s (400 cu ft/s) at mouth, up to 1,000 m^{3}/s (35,000 cu ft/s) in full flood

Basin features
- Progression: Po→ Adriatic Sea

The Parma is a large stream, 92 kilometres (57 mi) long, that begins in the Tuscan-Emilian Apennine Mountains and flows in the Parma valley, Italy.

== Path ==
It begins from the lake Lago Santo parmense (outflow called Parma di Lago Santo) and small lakes Gemio and Scuro (outflow called Parma di Badignana). After only 4 kilometres (2.5 mi) Parma di Lago Santo meets Parma di Badignana and then the river takes the name of Parma. It flows through the Province of Parma into Parma, dividing the city in two, and then continues to the Po.

== Local names ==
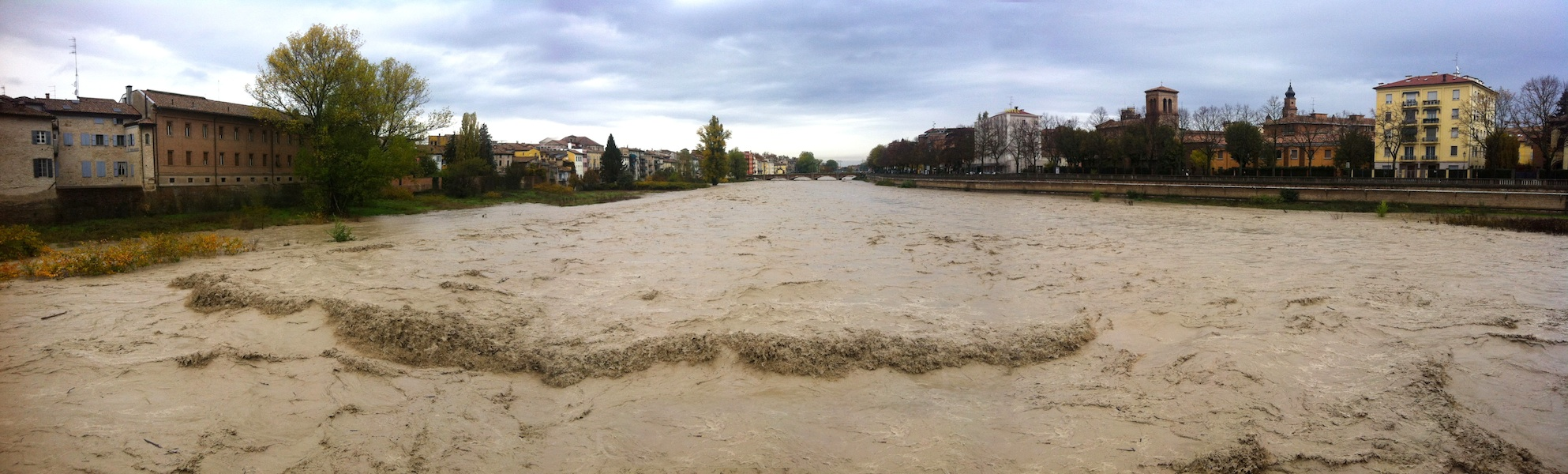
The Parma Voladora (local name for when the river is in full flood) on 11 November 2012

- Lungoparma is the local name for the urban area of the city of Parma along the river.
- la Parma is the way parmesans call the stream and its bed (not to be confused with il Parma, the local name for the Parma F.C.). The reason for the feminine article "la" is that in Parmesan dialect a stream is feminine.
- la Parma voladora indicates the Parma stream in full flood.
