= Santo Lake (Modena) =

Lake in Modena, Italy

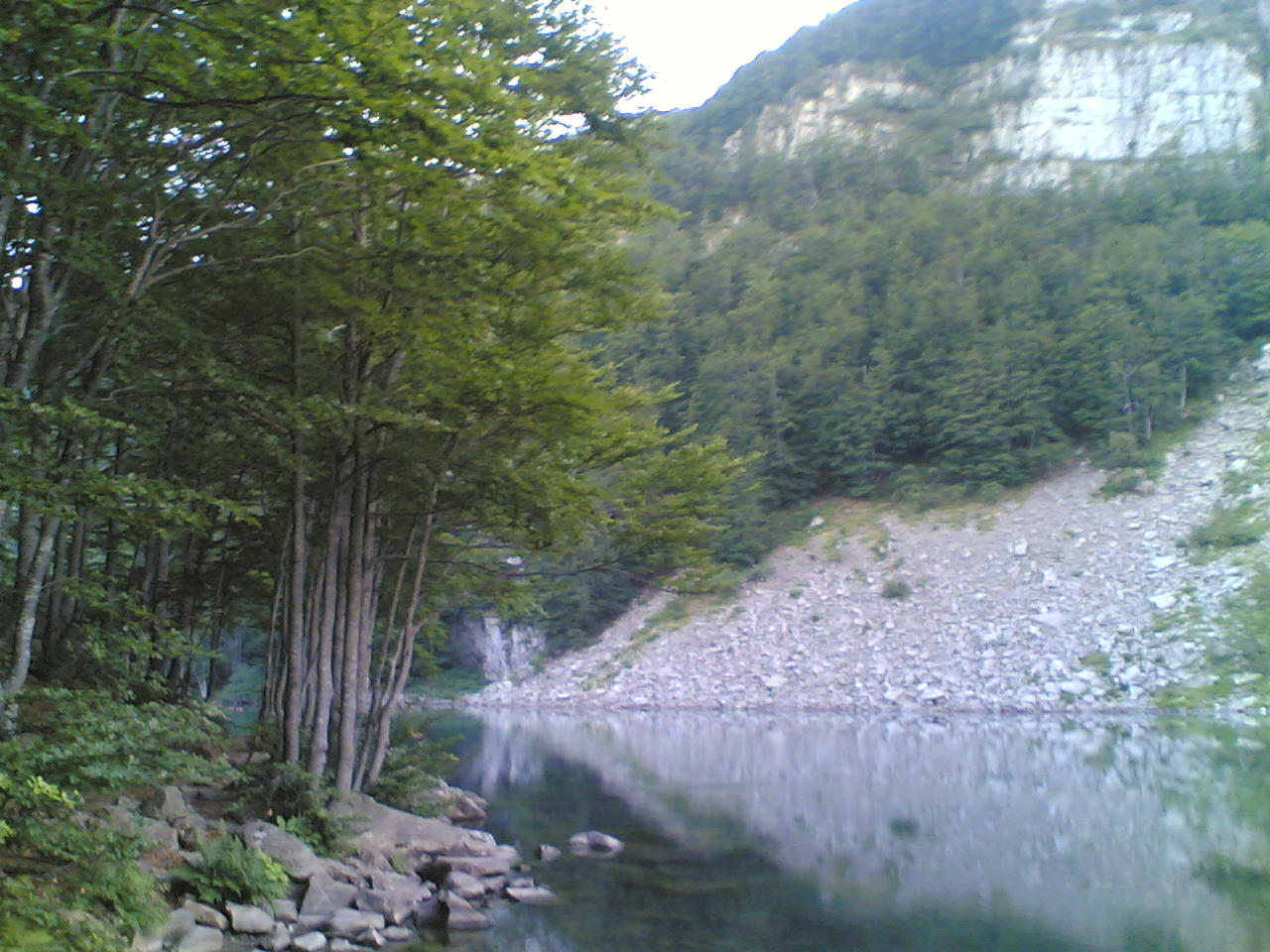

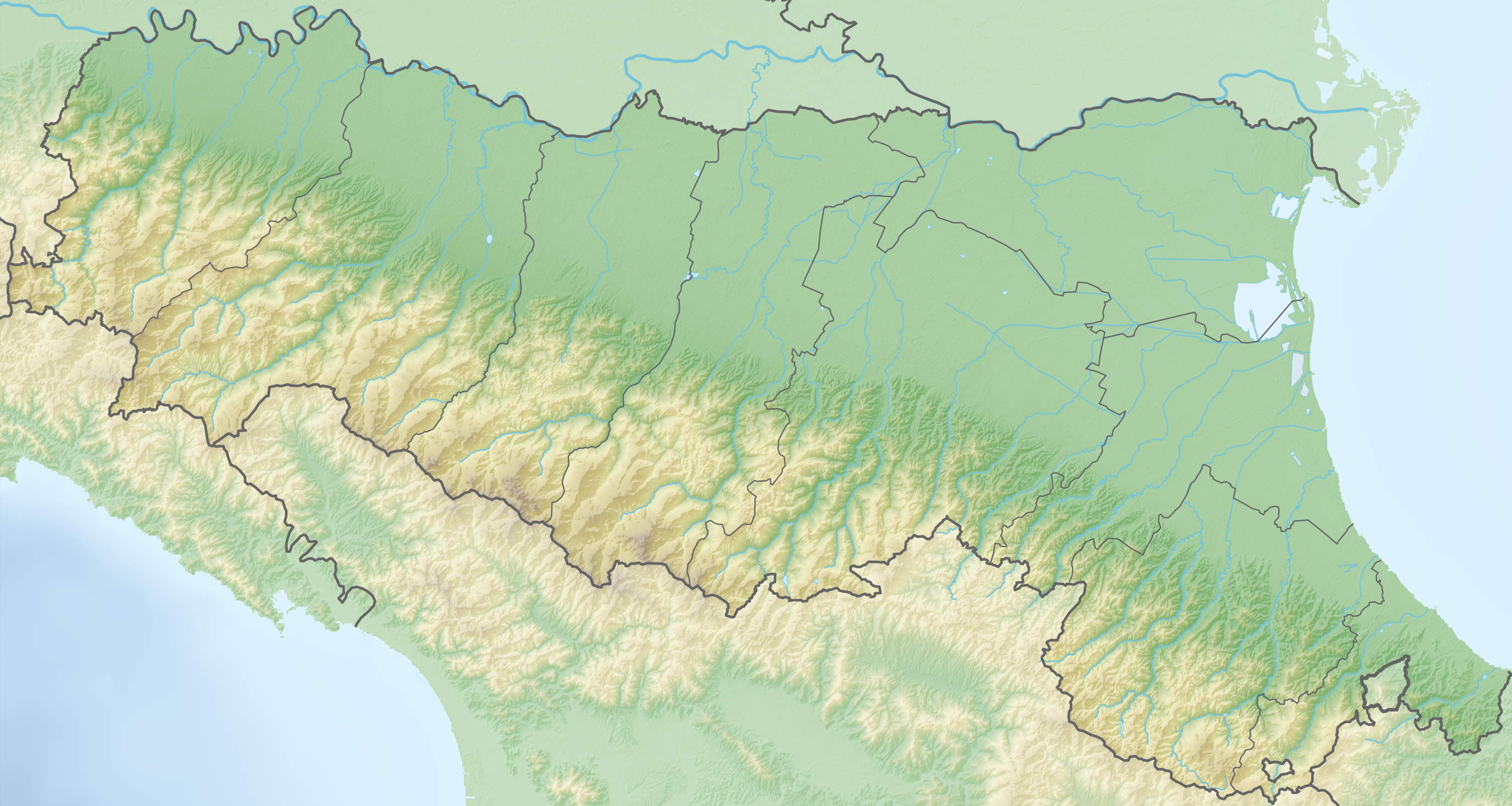
- Location within Emilia-Romagna
- Location: Province of Modena, Emilia-Romagna
- Coordinates: 44.136521°N 10.585861°E
- Primary outflows: Santo
- Basin countries: Italy
- Surface area: 0.053 km^{2} (0.020 sq mi)
- Surface elevation: 1,501 m (4,925 ft)

Santo Lake is a lake in the Province of Modena, Emilia-Romagna, Italy. At an elevation of 1501 m, its surface area is 0.053 km^{2}.
