= Giuseppe Rondizzoni =

Chilean general (1788–1866)

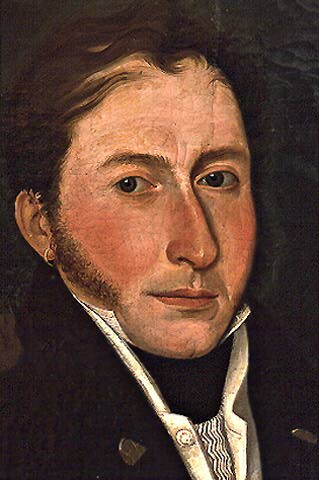
- Born: 14 March 1788; Mezzano Superiore, Italy
- Died: 24 May 1866 (aged 78); Valparaíso, Chile
- Military career
- Allegiance: French Empire; Chile
- Conflicts: War of the Sixth Coalition; Battle of Lützen; Battle of Bautzen; Battle of Dresden; Battle of Leipzig; Chilean War of Independence; Second Battle of Cancha Rayada; Battle of Mocopulli; Chilean Civil War of 1829–30; Battle of Lircay; Chilean Civil War of 1851; Battle of Loncomilla

Giuseppe Rondizzoni (14 March 1788 – 24 May 1866) was an Italian army officer who contributed to the independence of Chile.

== Early life and Napoleonic Wars ==
He was born in Mezzano Superiore on 14 March 1788. Rondizzoni joined the French Imperial Guard in 1807. As a part of Napoleon's army he took part in the Spanish campaign in 1808 and the Austrian one in 1809. In 1812 he participated in the campaign of Russia and the year following in that of Germany. He fought with Napoleon until his end in 1813 and 1814 in Germany (the battles of Lutzen, Bautzen, Dresden, Leipzig, Magdeburg). In 1815, with the rank of captain, Rondizzoni gave evidence that was of great value in Waterloo. The Napoleonic Wars caused him a total of four wounds and earned him twenty mentions in dispatches for his courage. He also received the Legion of Honor.

== Chile ==
Returning to Italy after Waterloo, Rondizzoni was admitted to the Regiment of the Duchy of Parma which was then ruled by Marie Louise of Austria. Later he moved to Philadelphia in the United States, and it was in this city, that he met the Chilean General Jose Miguel Carrera. In February 1817 he traveled with him to Buenos Aires on the schooner Clifton.

In July 1817 he joined the Chilean army and took part in Sorpresa de Cancha Rayada battle. He left the army after the shooting of the Carrera brothers, but came back in 1823 with the rank of lieutenant colonel.

Rondizzoni participated in the expedition for the liberation of Peru from the Spaniards earning the rank of colonel. Then he took part in the expedition of Chiloe in 1824 and 1826. He participated in the civil war of 1829–1830, fighting with Ramón Freire in the battles of Ochagavía and Lircay. The defeat suffered in the last battle forced him going into exile, first in Peru and then in El Salvador.

He returned to Chile in 1839, where he was appointed governor of Constitución on 12 April 1842 and governor of Talcahuano on 29 August 1849. In 1843 he was promoted to brigadier general.

He remained loyal to the government during the Revolution of 1851, fighting in the Battle of Loncomilla. He was appointed Chief of Army Staff in 1851. That same year he became intendente of Concepción and intendente of Chiloe in January 1853. In 1861 he took leave of the Army and retired in Valparaíso where he died on 24 May 1866.

Appointed a Member of the Legion of Merit of Chile, General Rondizzoni is still living in the memory of his adopted country, which has named streets, squares and monuments and even a fortified work in the port of Talcahuano in his honour.

== Sources ==
- Loevison, Ermanno (1930). Tipografia parmense (ed.). Gli Ufficiali Napoleonici Parmensi (in Italian). Parma, Italy. pp. 28–29.
- Loevison, Ermanno (1937). Dizionario Risorgimento (in Italian). Vol. 4. Parma, Italy. p. 104.
- da Mareto, Felice (1973). Deputazione di storia patria (ed.). Bibliografia generale delle antiche province parmensi (in Italian). Parma, Italy.
- "Il generale Giuseppe Rondizzoni Canepa, un parmense al servizio del Cile" (in Italian).
