= Clemente Bondi =

Italian poet and translator

Clemente Luigi Donnino Bondi
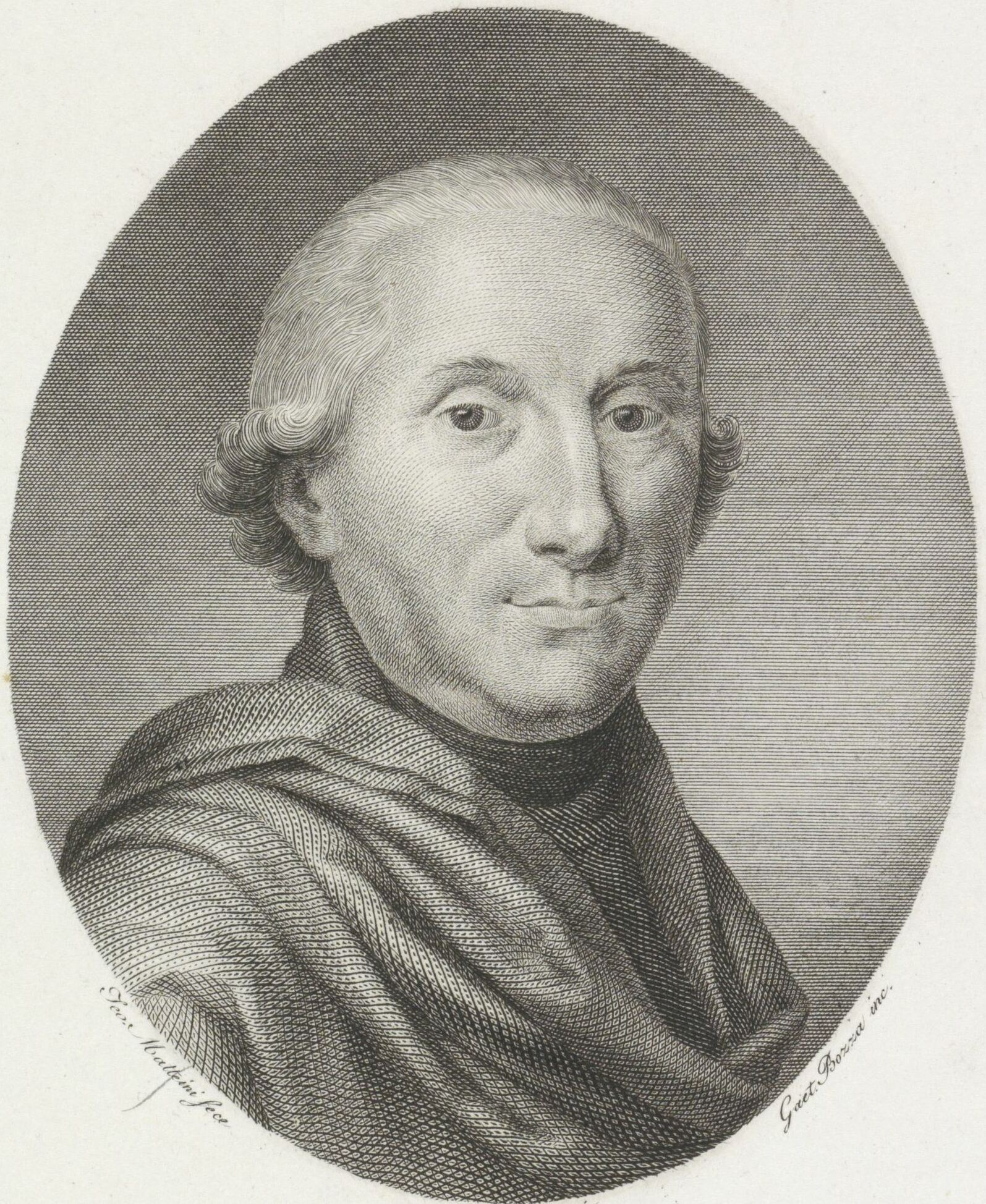
- Clemente Luigi Donnino Bondi
- Born: 27 June 1742; Mezzano Superiore, Italy
- Died: 20 June 1821 (aged 78); Vienna, Austria
- Occupations: poet, translator, religious
- Writing career
- Literary movement: Classicism

Clemente Luigi Donnino Bondi (27 June 1742 – 20 June 1821) was an Italian poet and translator.

== Biography ==
Clemente Bondi was born in Mezzano Superiore, not far from Parma. Fatherless at a young age, he was given the opportunity to study, thanks to an uncle who was a supply officer of Parma seminary.

In 1760, Bondi joined the Jesuit order, at the end of his studies he was transferred to Padua, where he attended to teach. After the dissolution of the Jesuit order, in 1773, Bondi wrote a polemical work addressed to Pope Clement XIV. This writing forced him to take refuge in Tyrol. Back in Italy later, he became the librarian of noble family Zanardi in Mantua. During a trip to Milan, he befriended the Archduke Ferdinand of Habsburg-Lorraine. When in 1796 the Archduke moved to Brünn (now Brno in the Czech Republic), he called Bondi with him. The literary man was charged with the education of Ferdinand’s children and the task of a librarian. In 1810, the Archduke turned his home in Vienna, taking with him Bondi, who remained in the imperial capital until his death in June 1821.

== Works ==
The literary career of Clemente Bondi began during his exile in Tyrol. During this period he wrote a tragedy, Il Melesindo, and the poem "La giornata villereccia". The richest period of his artistic production, however, was during his stay in Mantua, where he had the opportunity to frequent a lively intellectual circle. In the years spent in Mantua, he wrote: La Felicità (1775), La Moda (1777), Le Conversazioni (1778), and L’Incendio (1784). The complete works of Bondi were first published in six volumes in 1798 in Venice, in an edition entitled Opere edite e inedite in versi e in prosa by the Venetian Adolfo Cesare. This edition seems to contain a number of texts that the author disowned later. In his years with the Archduke Ferdinand, Bondi wrote little. His main concern at this time, was to rewrite poems and to edit a new compilation in Vienna in 1808, with a note avowing this complete edition was the only one vouched by the author. Meanwhile in 1801, Adolfo Cesare, the Venetian publisher of the first edition published a seventh book completing his edition of 1798.

Clemente was more able as a translator of classical texts, including: the Aeneid, the Georgics, the Eclogues of Virgil and the Metamorphoses of Ovid. His work was appreciated for the rich captions and notes accompanying its translations so that it dubbed him the "Delille of Italy".

== Sources ==
- Dalla Costa, Laura (1997). Profilo del poeta Clemente Bondi (in Italian). Padua, Italy: degree thesis at Padua University.
- Affò, Ireneo; Angelo Pezzana (1973). Arnaldo Forni (ed.). Memorie degli scrittori e letterati parmigiani (in Italian). Bologna, Italy.
- Donati, Alessandro (1913). Laterza (ed.). Poeti minori del Settecento (in Italian). Bari, Italy.
- Maier, Bruno (1951). R. Ricciardi (ed.). Lirici del Settecento (in Italian). Milano-Napoli, Italy.
- da Mareto, Felice (1973). Deputazione di storia patria (ed.). Bibliografia generale delle antiche province parmensi (in Italian). Parma, Italy.
