= Monte Marmagna =

Mountain in Italy

- Location within Italy

Highest point
- Elevation: 1,852 m (6,076 ft)
- Prominence: 171 m (561 ft)
- Coordinates: 44°23′48″N 09°56′46″E

Geography
- Location: Emilia-Romagna, Italy
- Parent range: Tuscan-Emilian Apennines

Monte Marmagna is a mountain of the Apennine Mountains. It is located in Italy on the border between Tuscany and Emilia-Romagna.

== Geography ==
The mountain has an elevation of 1,852 m and is one of the highest points in the Emilia-Romagna region of Italy.
