= Enza =

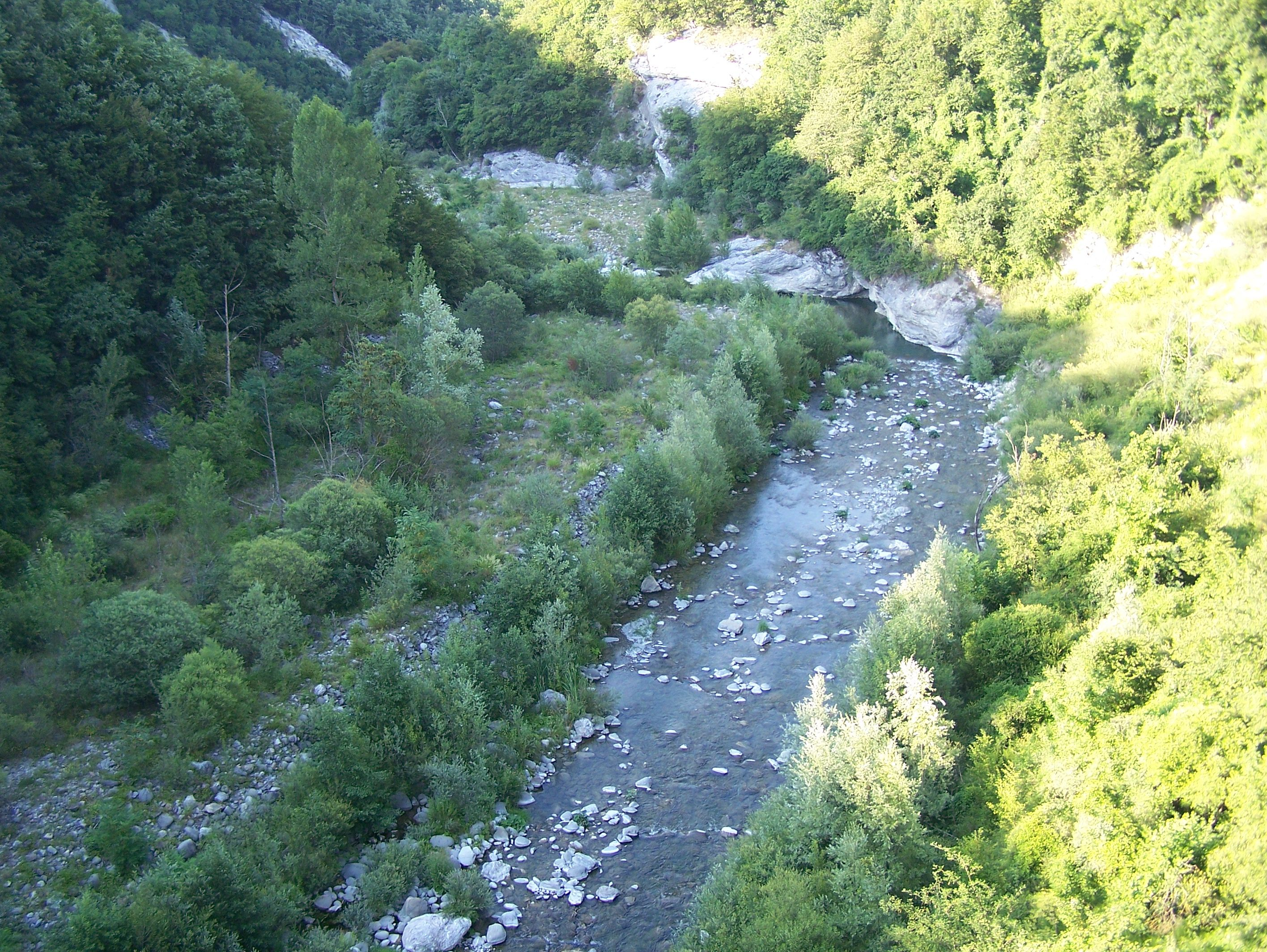
- View of the Enza upper course

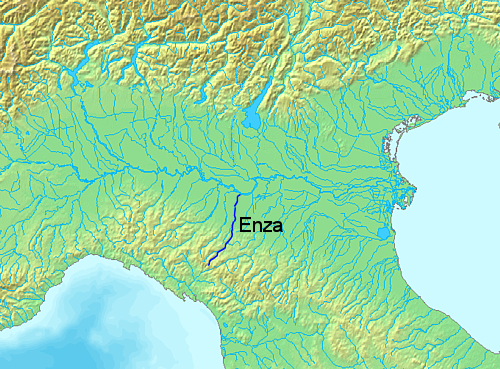

Location
- Country: Italy

Physical characteristics
- Source
  - location: Alpe di Succiso
  - elevation: 1,406 m (4,613 ft)
- Mouth: Po
  - coordinates: 44.9091°N 10.5223°E
- Length: 93 km (58 mi)
- Basin size: 2,899 km^{2} (1,119 mi^{2})
- Discharge
  - average: 12.1 m^{3}/s (430 cu ft/s)

Basin features
- Progression: Po→ Adriatic Sea

The Enza (Italian pronunciation: [ˈɛntsa]; Emilian: Èinsa) is a torrent in northern Italy, a right tributary of the river Po. Its source is at the Alpe di Succiso, in the northern Apennines (Tuscan-Emilian Apennines), at 1,406 metres (4,613 ft). The Enza is the current boundary of the provinces of Parma and Reggio Emilia.

After the source, at 1,157 metres (3,796 ft) above sea level, it forms the Paduli or Lagastrello artificial lake, and flows for 93 kilometres (58 mi) in the aforementioned provinces. In its course in the Pianura Padana it becomes wider and flows into the Po near Brescello.

In ancient times it was known by its Latin name Incia.
