= Casola, Terenzo =

Casola
- Frazione
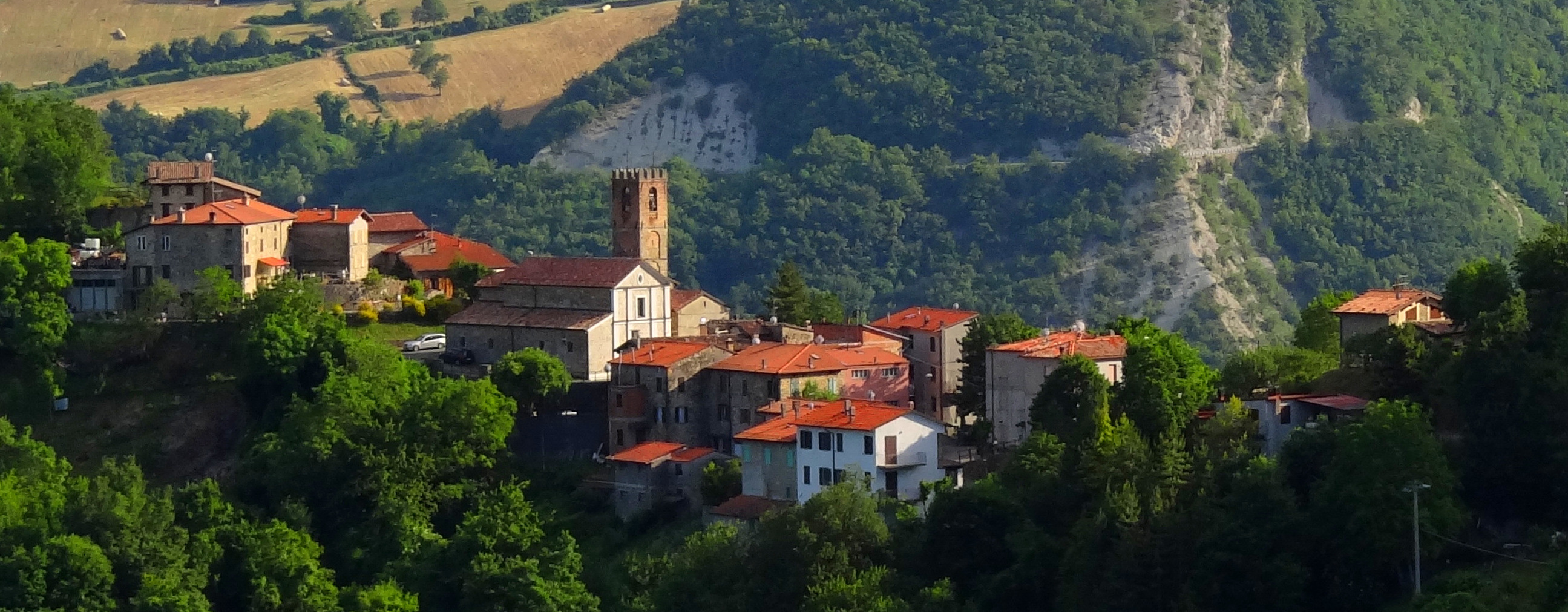

- Location of Casola in Italy
- Coordinates: 44.59408°N 10.07269°E
- Country: Italy
- Region: Emilia Romagna
- Province: Parma
- Comune: Terenzo
- Elevation: 755 m (2,477 ft)

Population
  - Total: 78
- Time zone: UTC+1 (CET)
  - Summer (DST): UTC+2 (CEST)
- Postal code: 43040

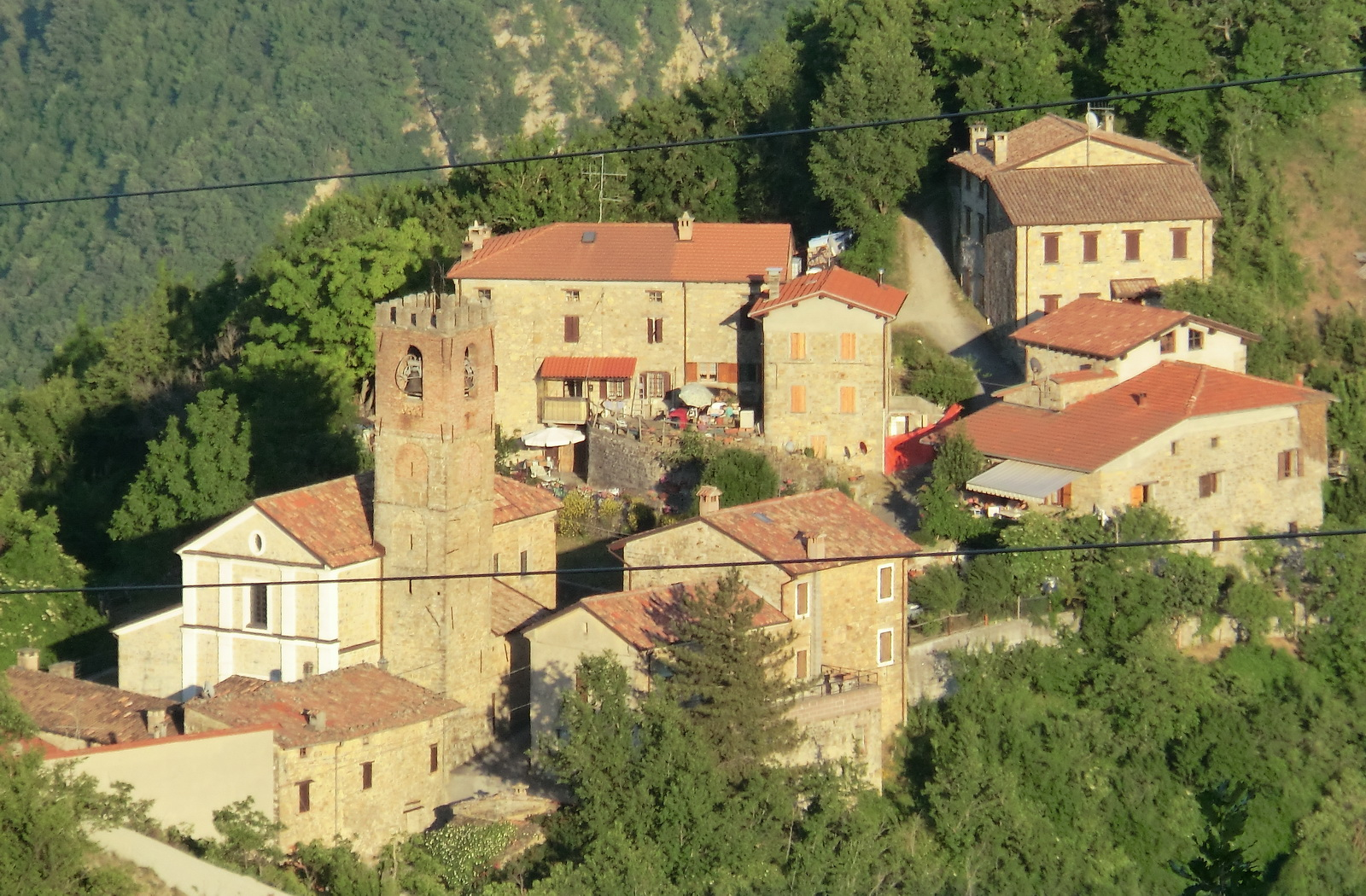
Panoramic view of the village

Casola is a village in Italy in the Province of Parma, in the Emilia-Romagna region. It is more than 3 kilometers (approximately 1.86 miles) from the town of Terenzo which it is part of.

37-38 inhabitants live in the settlement, with more than half of them being female, with the others male. Additionally, almost half of the people living there are married, but a sizable amount are single or widowed. There are many towns named "Casola" in the province of Parma. However, only one has the name of Casola without any additions such as "Villa di Casola," "Castello di Casola," "Casola di Terenzo."

== Overview ==
Today, the town in "the Parmese Apennine," has a well-known church, and manufactures pottery. It is not to be confused with towns with the same name in other parts of Italy.

== See also ==
- Italian language
- Italians
