= Piazza dei Cavalli =

Urban square in Piacenza, Italy

Coordinates: 45.05269°N 9.69303°E

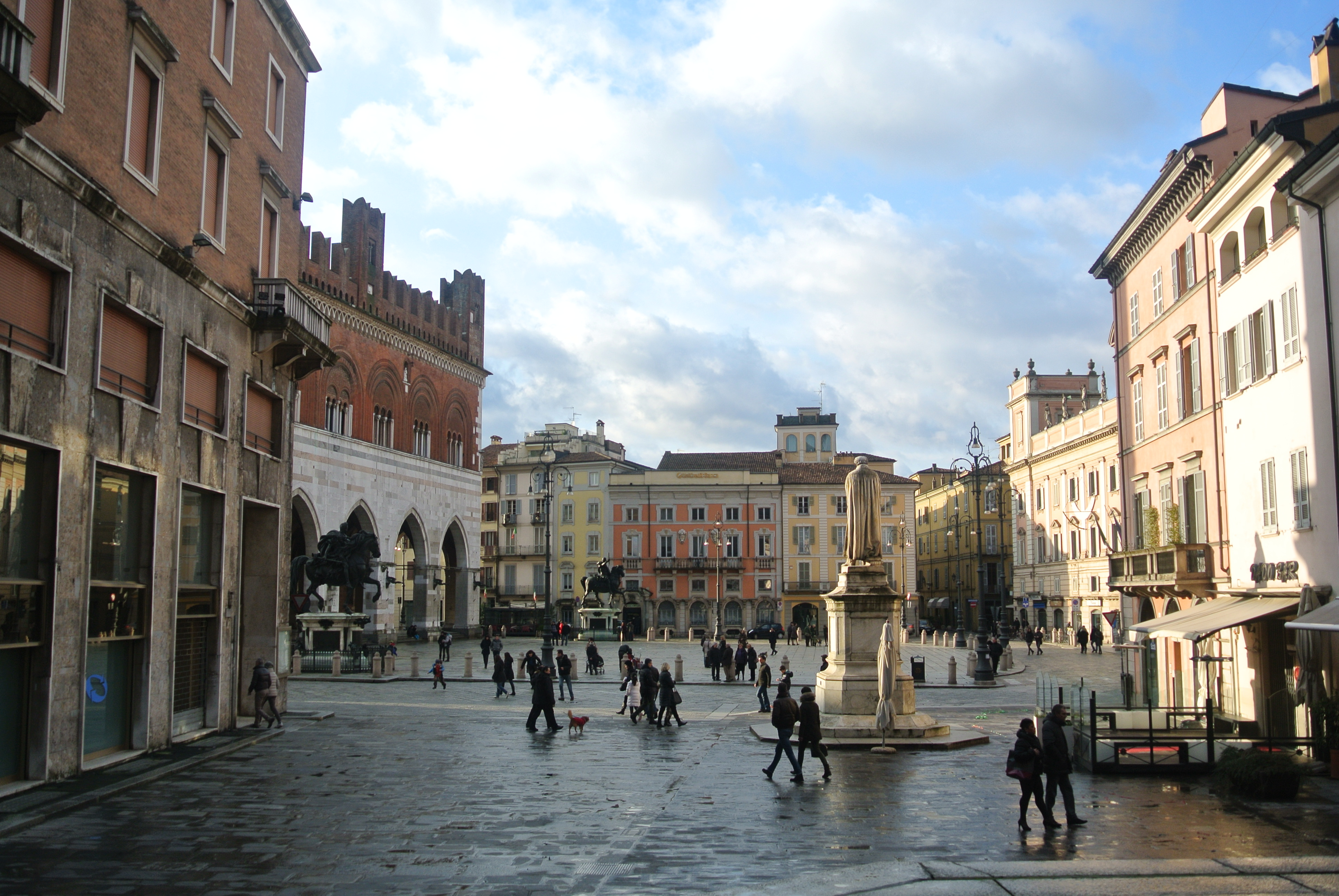

Piazza dei Cavalli is one of the oldest and main public squares in the historic center of the city of Piacenza, Italy. Once called Piazza Grande, it competes with the Piazza del Duomo, located some 4 blocks southeast for prominence. This square, unlike the latter, is mainly ringed by secular buildings relating to the political and business community.

The piazza spaces here are irregular, lined to the northwest by the former city hall, the Palazzo Gotico, which is flanked to the south in a recessed fashion by the present city hall, the Palazzo del Collegio dei Mercanti. Along the east of the recess are two modern buildings, till one arrives to the contiguous open space east of the piazza before the church of San Francesco. To the north of the piazza rises the large neoclassic-style Palazzo del Governatore.

The two equestrian statues that give the piazza its name are astride of facade of the Palazzo Gotico. The statues were designed by Francesco Mochi and commissioned on occasion of the arrival to Piacenza of Margherita Aldobrandini, the wife of Ranuccio I Farnese. The cost of the bronze statues was then 44,107 Roman scudi (presumably 7200 lira reggiana). The statue of Ranuccio was erected in 1620, and the statue of his father Alessandro Farnese, Duke of Parma (1545-1592) in 1624. The steed of the former horseman, who acquired a reputation as a brutal tyrant, appears tamed relative to that of Alessandro. The bas-reliefs at Alessandro's base depict military service of the Duke performed with Catholic armies: the capture of Antwerp in 1585 and relieving the Siege of Paris (1590). The base of Alessandro's statue has an allegory of good government.
