= Bramieri =

Bramieri is an Italian surname from Piacenza. Notable people with the surname include:

- Gino Bramieri (1928–1996), Italian comedian and actor
- Giuseppe Bramieri, Italian painter
