= Giuseppe Bramieri =

16th- and 17th-century Italian painter

Giuseppe Bramieri (active late 16th and early 17th centuries) was an Italian painter of the Mannerist period, active in Piacenza.

== Biography ==
Little is known of his biography. His opus is limited to three signed works:

- Madonna and Child with Saints John the Baptist and Bartholemew, in the parish church of Gambaro, Piacenza;
- Madonna and Two Saints, in Santi Severino e Sossio, Naples;
- Martyrdom of St Lawrence, in San Francesco, Piacenza.

His works appear stiff, and influenced by Gian Paolo Lomazzo, Michelangelo or Denis Calvaert.
