= Lotario Tomba =

Italian architect

Lotario Tomba (27 May 1749 – 15 September 1823) was an Italian architect, active mainly in Piacenza in a late-Baroque and early-Neoclassic style.

== Biography ==
He was born at Sarmato and died in Piacenza. He likely trained with his father, who was a worker in construction. Buta appears to have learned design from the circle of Petitot who was active in Parma after 1750 till 1770. In 1785, he traveled to Rome. Between 1778 and 1796, he served as architect for the Comune di Piacenza.

== Works ==
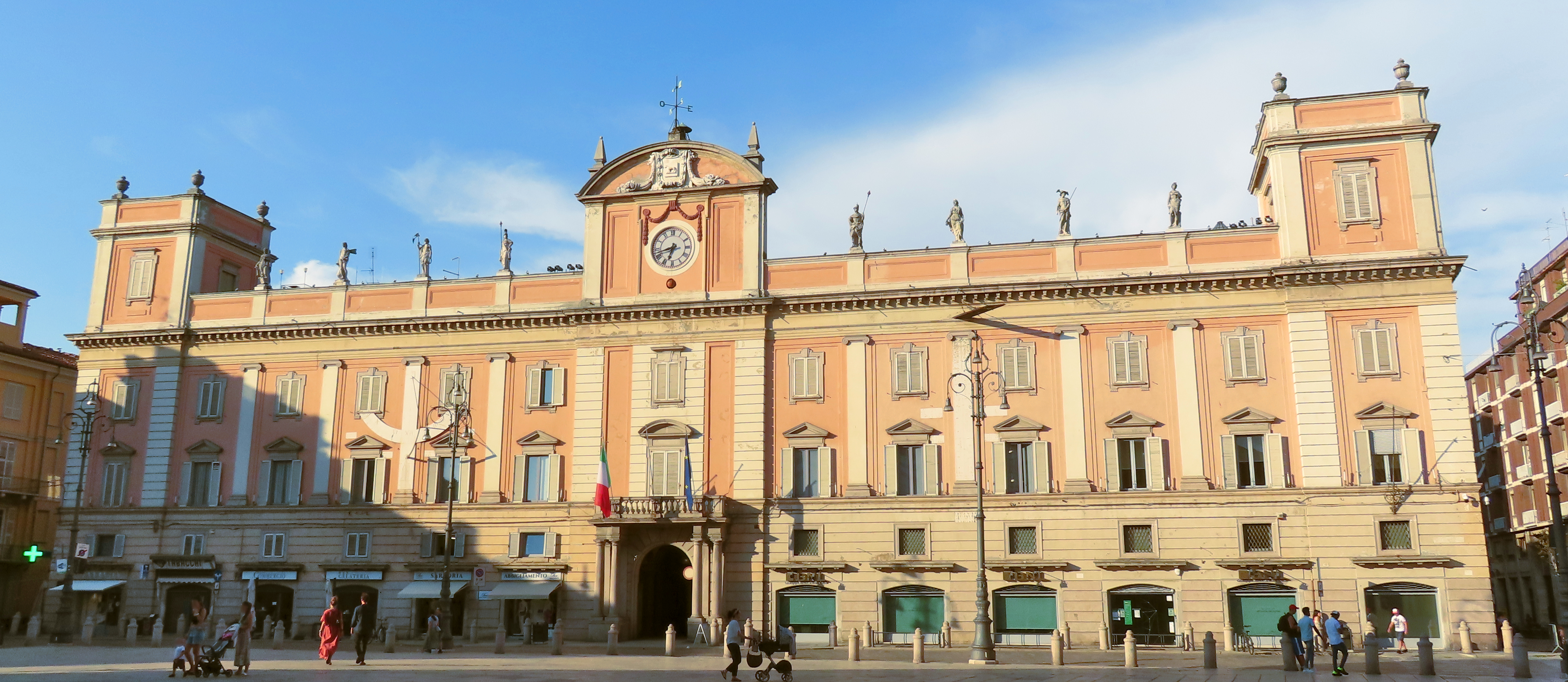
Palazzo del Governatore

- Teatro Municipale, Piacenza
- Facade of the Palazzo del Governatore in Piazza dei Cavalli
- Piacenza Cimitero
- Palazzo Scotti di Montalbo
- Cappella del Rosario in the church of San Giovanni in Canale
- Restorations of Santa Maria di Campagna
