= Palazzo del Governatore, Piacenza =

Palace in Piacenza, Italy

Coordinates: 45.05290°N 9.69331°E

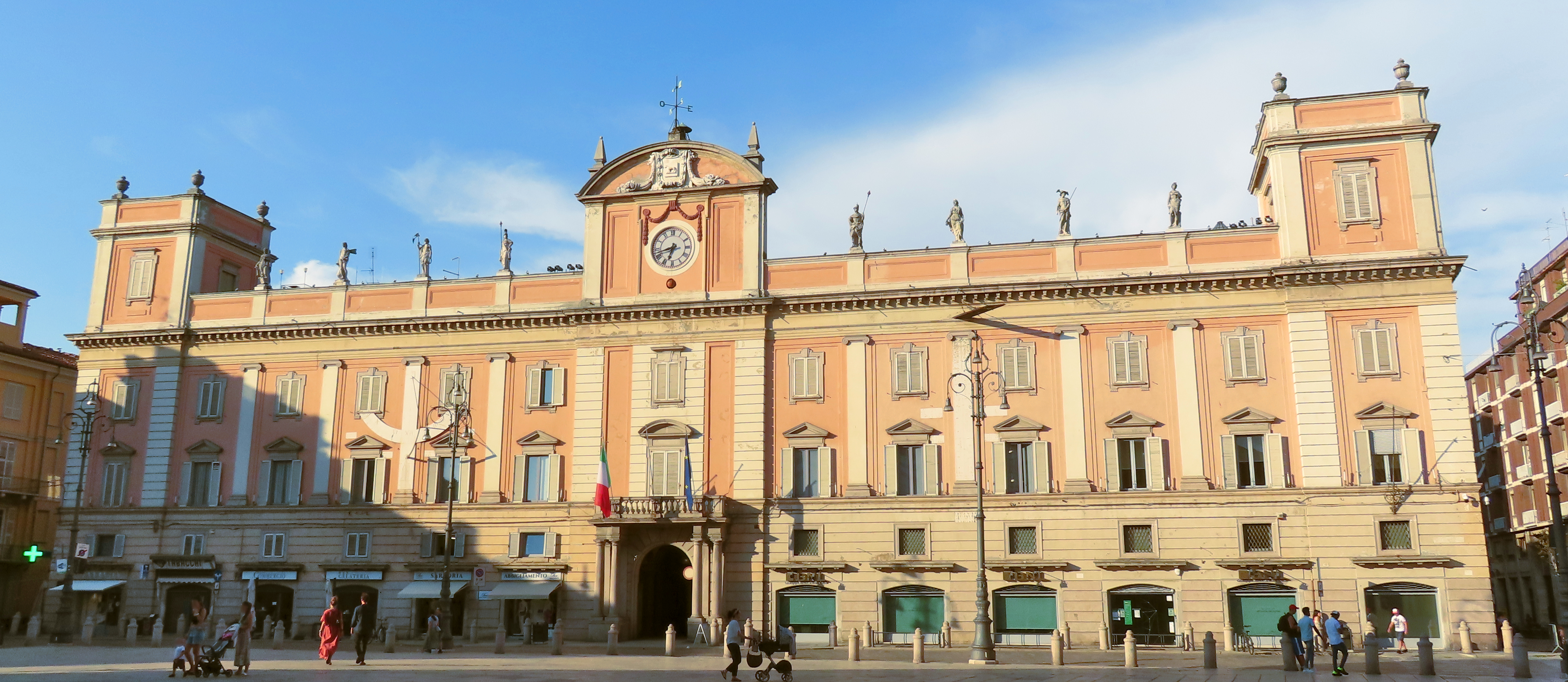

Palazzo del Governatore is a neoclassic-style palace located facing Piazza dei Cavalli in the historic center of Piacenza, northern Italy which now houses the town's chamber of commerce. The facade is flanked by two bronze equestrian statues sculpted by Francesco Mochi and depicting the Farnese Dukes of Parma: Ranuccio (1612–20) and his father, Alexander (1620-1629). Across the piazza is the Gothic-style Palazzo Comunale and the two equestrian statues of Farnese dukes, Alessandro and Ranuccio.

== History ==
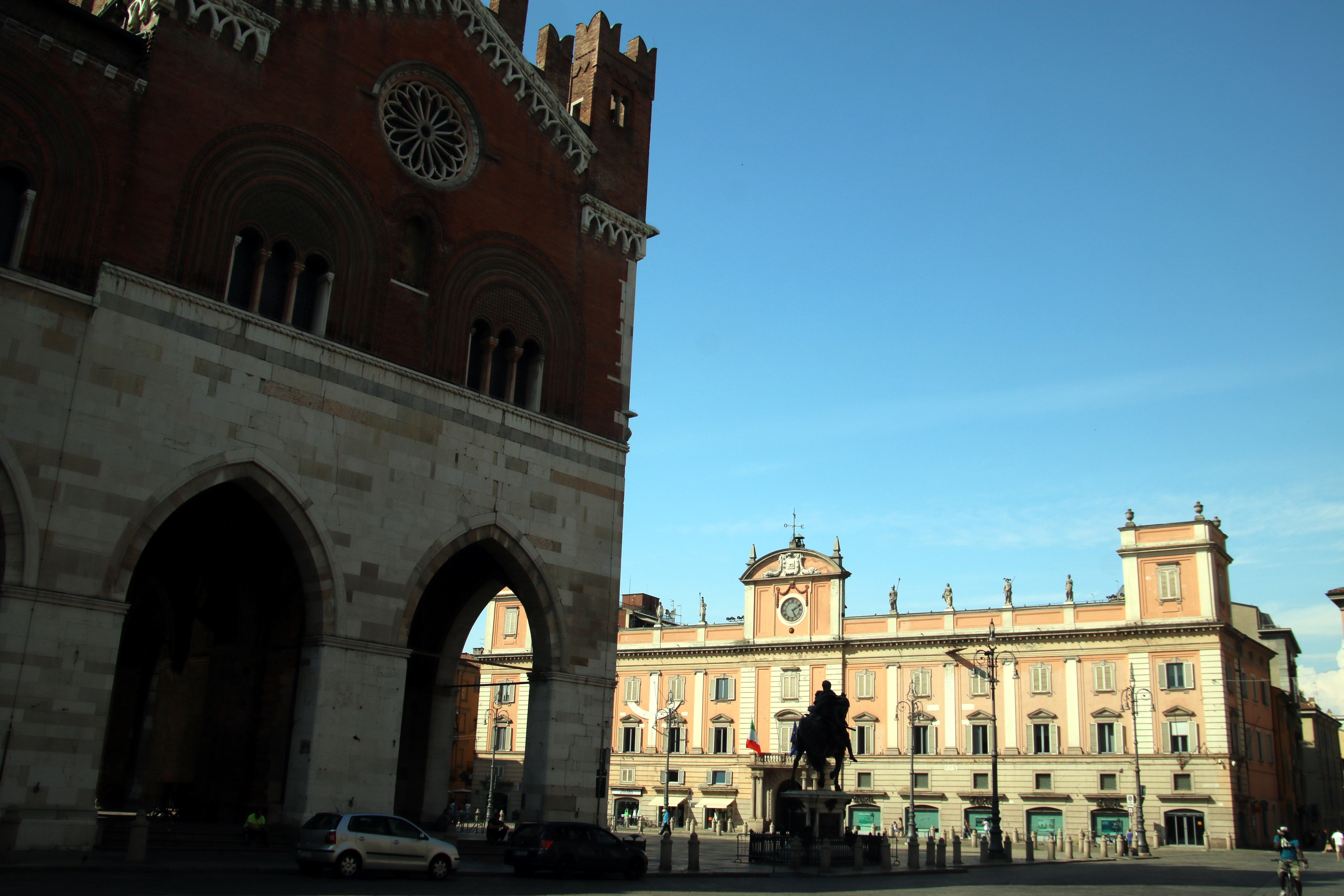
Piazza dei Cavalli

After pavement was place in the Piazza Cavalli, it was decided to rebuild the government offices located in the buildings at this site. The prior buildings had been erected by the then-Sforza rulers of Piacenza to house the local governor. That structure had an open portico, which was enclosed and now houses a number of businesses. The architect Lotario Tomba (1749-1823) completed the design with corner towers and a roofline with statues and vases; construction began in 1781, and the facade was completed by 1788.

The second pilaster to the right of the entrance portal, has a solar calendar created in 1795 by Giovanni Francesco Baratierri, a local mathematician.
