= Santa Margherita, Piacenza =

Deconsecrated church in Emilia Romagna, Italy

Coordinates: 45.05501°N 9.68914°E

Santa Margherita is a Baroque style, now deconsecrated Roman Catholic church, located at Vicolo Santa Margherita #9, in Piacenza, Region of Emilia Romagna, Italy. The church since 1992 is used as an auditorium for cultural events by the Fondazione di Piacenza e Vigevano.

== History ==
The church was built in the early 17th century by the confraternity of the Trinity, also called the Confraternity of the Redemption of slaves, employed in ransoming Christians captured by the Moors. The construction had been encouraged by the bishop Paolo Burali. Originally this confraternity was affiliated with the church of San Nicolo de Zanlonghi, but in 1603 that church was converted into a nursing home for women. An 1841 inventory lists an altarpiece depicting the Martyrdom of St Margaret by Sebastiano Galeotti.

The façade has a classic baroque convex and concave facade. The interior has lateral chapels. During the reconstruction, the foundations were found to date to Ancient Roman times, and the presbytery was built atop an early romanesque paleochristian church dedicated to Santa Liberata.
