= Palazzo Comunale, Piacenza =

Palace in Piacenza, Italy

Coordinates: 45.05256°N 9.69286°E

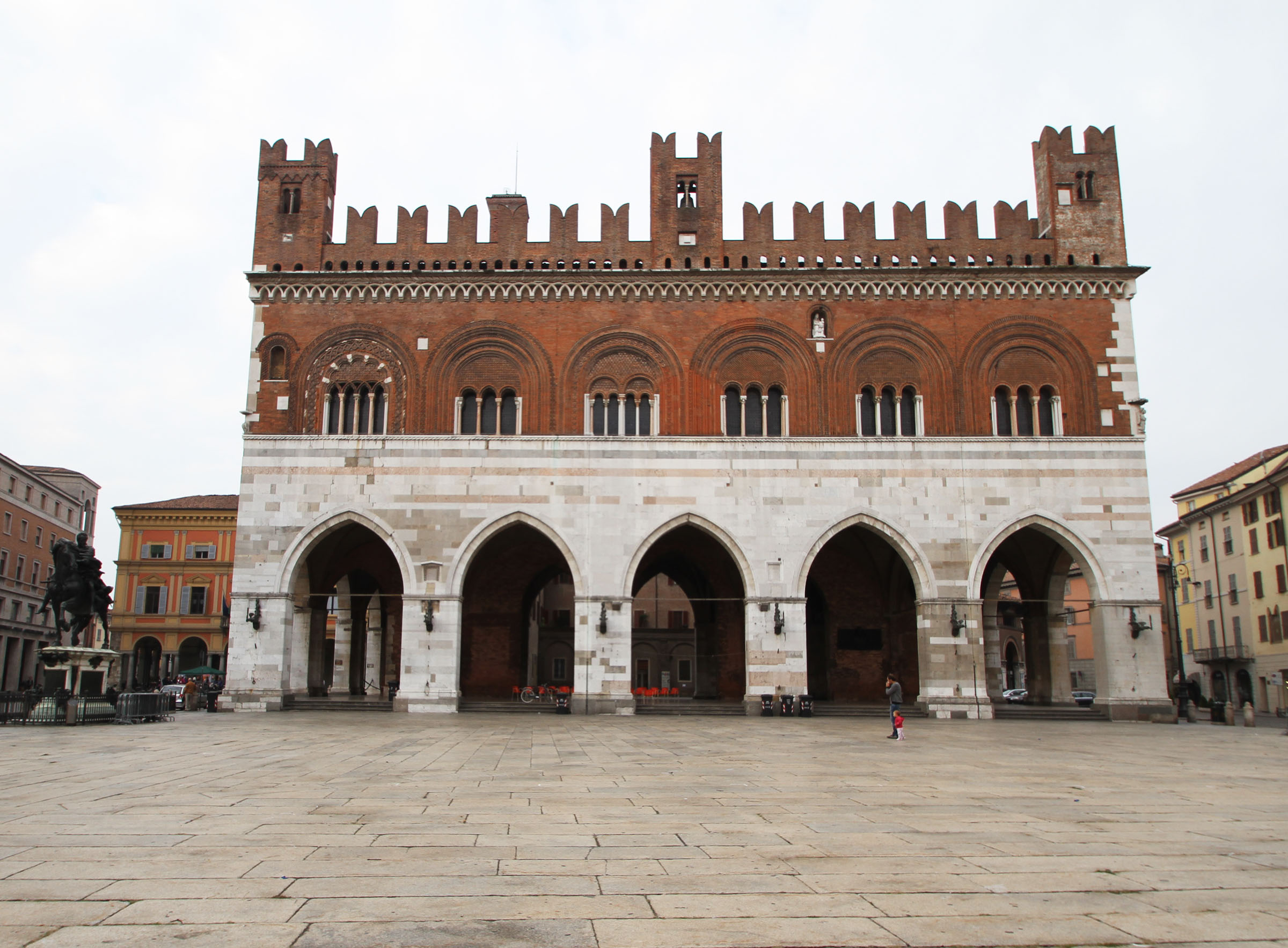
Facade of Palazzo Gotico with Equestrian statue of Alessandro Farnese (left)

Palazzo Comunale (also called Palazzo Gotico) is a Gothic style palace located facing Piazza del Cavalli in the historic center of Piacenza, northern Italy which now serves as the seat of municipal administration. The facade is flanked by two bronze equestrian statues sculpted by Francesco Mochi and depicting the Farnese Dukes of Parma: Ranuccio (1612–20) and his father, Alexander (1620-1629). Across the piazza is the late-Baroque or early neoclassic Palazzo del Governatore (1787) designed by Lotario Tomba. Recessed and to the right is the 17th-century Collegio dei Mercanti.

== History ==
In 1281, the ghibellin Alberto Scoto, wanted to build the palace and sent for four architects from Piacenza: Pietro da Cagnano, Negro De Negri, Gherardo Bellman and Pietro da Borghetto.

Following the first project, the palace should have been quadrangular, but work was stopped due to an epidemic plague. Only the north side of the palace was finished. The result is an excellent example of civil ogive architecture in lombard Gothic style.

Inside there is a large lounge which, in 1644, became a theatre, to a design by Cristoforo Rangon.

== See also ==
- Palazzo Farnese, Piacenza
