= Palazzo del Collegio dei Mercanti, Piacenza =

Palace in Piacenza, Italy

Coordinates: 45.05209°N 9.69280°E

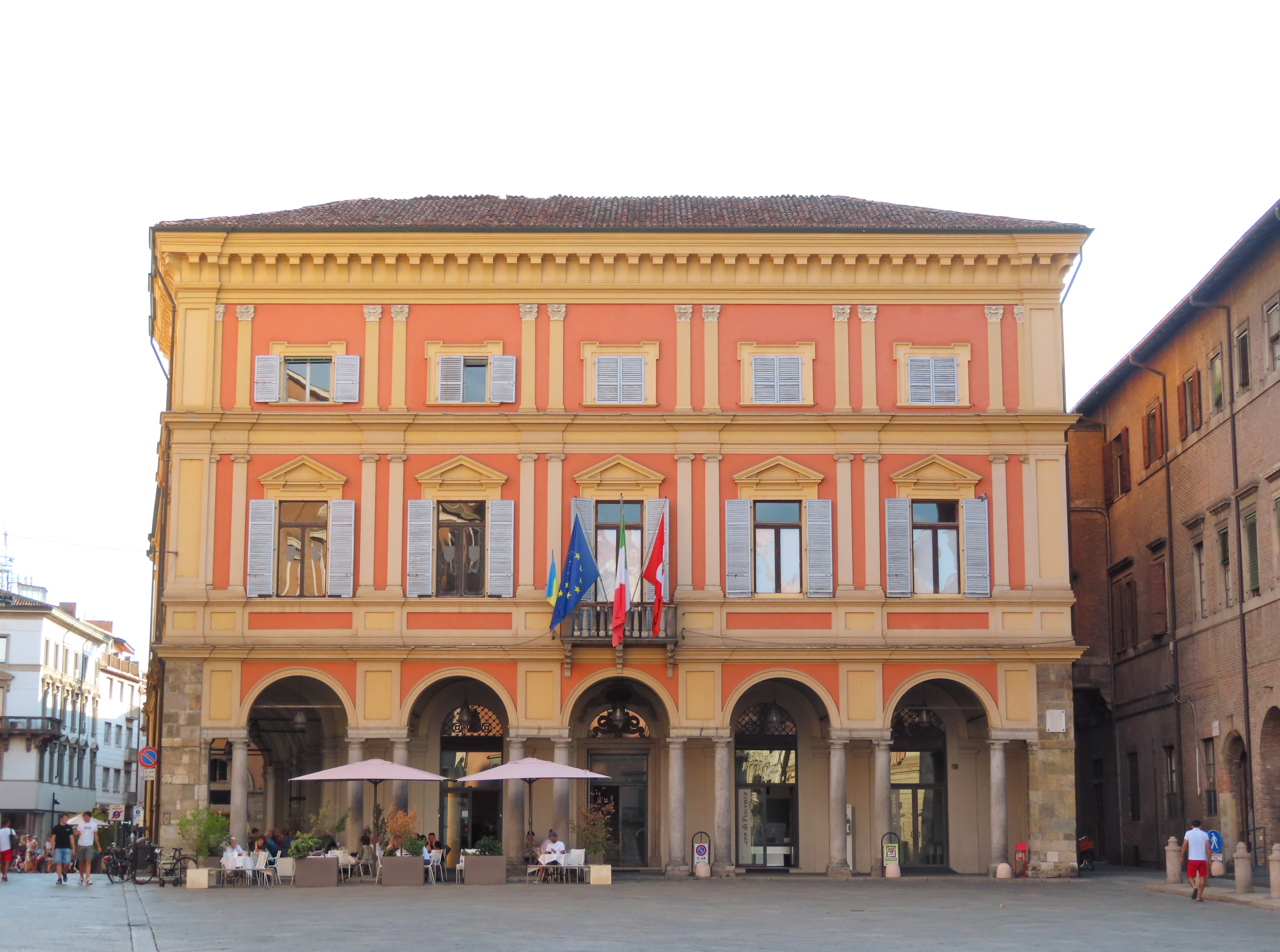
Northern facade of palace

The Palazzo del Collegio dei Mercanti (Palace of the College of Merchants) is a baroque-style palace located recessed and to the left of the Palazzo Gotico facing Piazza dei Cavalli in the historic center of Piacenza, northern Italy. It now houses the offices of the town hall and council.

== History ==
The structure was erected in 1676–1697 by the guild of merchants in the city. The design was completed by Camillo Caccialupi. The ground floor has an open portico with twin columns. The entrance stairwell is frescoed and decorated with a statue of justice. The building became part of the municipal offices in the 19th century. During the 19th-century, the main hall was also used by the Societa Filodrammatica for recitals, including the work Demetrio by the abbot Bettinelli.
