= San Francesco, Piacenza =

Roman Catholic church in Italy

Coordinates: 45°03′21″N 9°41′28″E

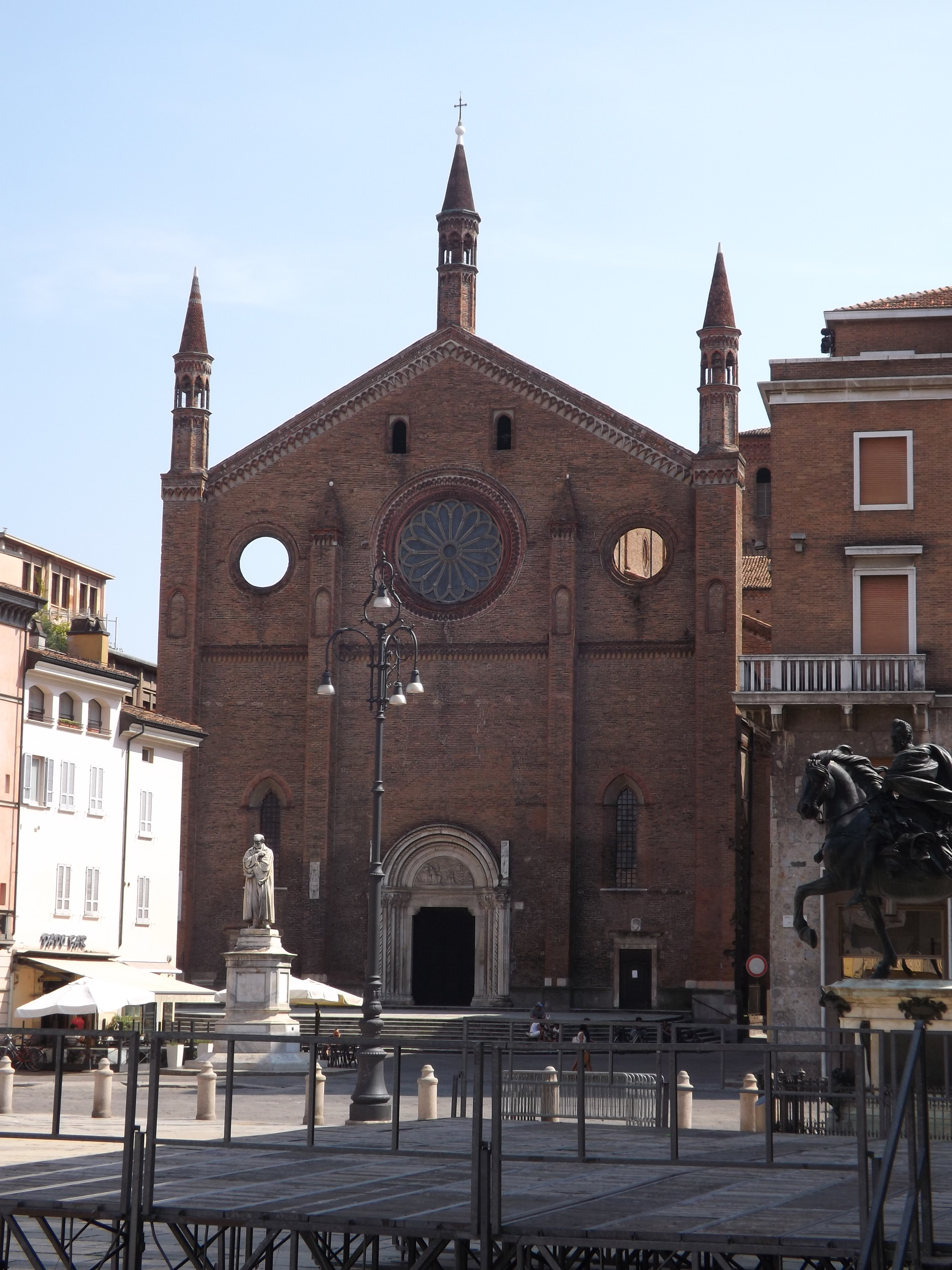
Church of San Francesco - Piacenza

San Francesco is a Roman Catholic church, located on Piazza Cavalli #68 in Piacenza, Italy. It was built in a style described as Lombard Gothic and is centrally located facing towards the Piazza del Cavalli, which is surrounded by the Palazzo Gotico and the Palazzo del Governatore.

== History ==
The church and adjacent monastery were built for the Friars Minor, a member of the Franciscan order, between 1278 and 1363 under the patronage of the Ghibelline Umbertino Landi, who donated the land. It soon became a convent for nuns of the Clarissan order. From this church in 1547, Count Agostino Landi addressed the assembled people to announce that he and other nobles had murdered Pier Luigi Farnese, Duke of Parma. During the Napoleonic period despite a brief conversion of parts of the complex into armory and then a hospital, the church remained open. For a time it was dedicated to the early Christian martyr, St Napoleon. The church was returned to the clerics, but by 1810, they had left the convent. In 1848, the annexation of Piacenza to the Kingdom of Sardinia was proclaimed from this church.

The layout of this church resembles the plan of the basilica of San Francesco in Bologna, including the apse with radiating chapels. The façade is made with simple brick with two thin buttresses flanking the central portal and a rose window. Lateral to the rose window are two round oculi. On the sides are two buttresses terminating in spires and pinnacles. The central portico has a rounded marble Romanesque arch with recessed thin columns, and sculptural relief in the lunette depicting St Francis receives Stigmata (1480). This facade and the piazza in front were refurbished to accentuate the initial gothic edifice during a refurbishment started in 1879, continued in 1819 by Camillo Guidotti, but not completed until after 1931 with renewed input by 1931 the architect Ettore Martini (1870–1960). In front of the facade is a Monument to Gian Domenico Romagnosi (1761 – 1835).

The interior of the church was amply decorated with frescoes and icons.The church contains frescoes from the 14th and 15th centuries. The dome of the Chapel of the Immaculate Conception was decorated with frescoes (1597) by Giovanni Battista Trotti (known as Il Malosso) . The second altarpieces on the right depict an Annunciation and Birth of Mary also painted by GB Trotti]]. The altarpiece depicting San Filippo Bennizi was painted by the studio of Carlo Maratta. An altarpiece depicting San Pellegrino Laziosi was painted by Clemente Ruta. Above the entrance to the Sacristy is a depiction of St Eligius Bishop by Camillo Procaccini. In the sacristy is a depiction of San Liborio by Carlo Sacchi. In the chapel of St Francis is a depiction of the Descent of the Holy Spirit painted by Giuseppe, the brother of CF Nuvoloni, and originally found at the former church of Santo Spirito. In another chapel is an altarpiece depicting the Virgin, St Peter, and St John the Baptist by Francesco Francia. In the church is a funeral monument to the lawyer Barnaba del Pozzo, who once owned the present Palazzo Suzani. This lawyer collected the body of the slain Duke Pierluigi Farnese, and arranged its burial. Del Pozzo was knighted by Pope Paul III.

The church also has altarpieces by Bernardo Castelli, Bartolomeo Schedone, Carlo Francesco Nuvolone, and Bernardino Gatti.

Giuseppe Sacchini is buried in the church.
