= Teatro Municipale, Piacenza =

Coordinates: 45.04948°N 9.69378°E

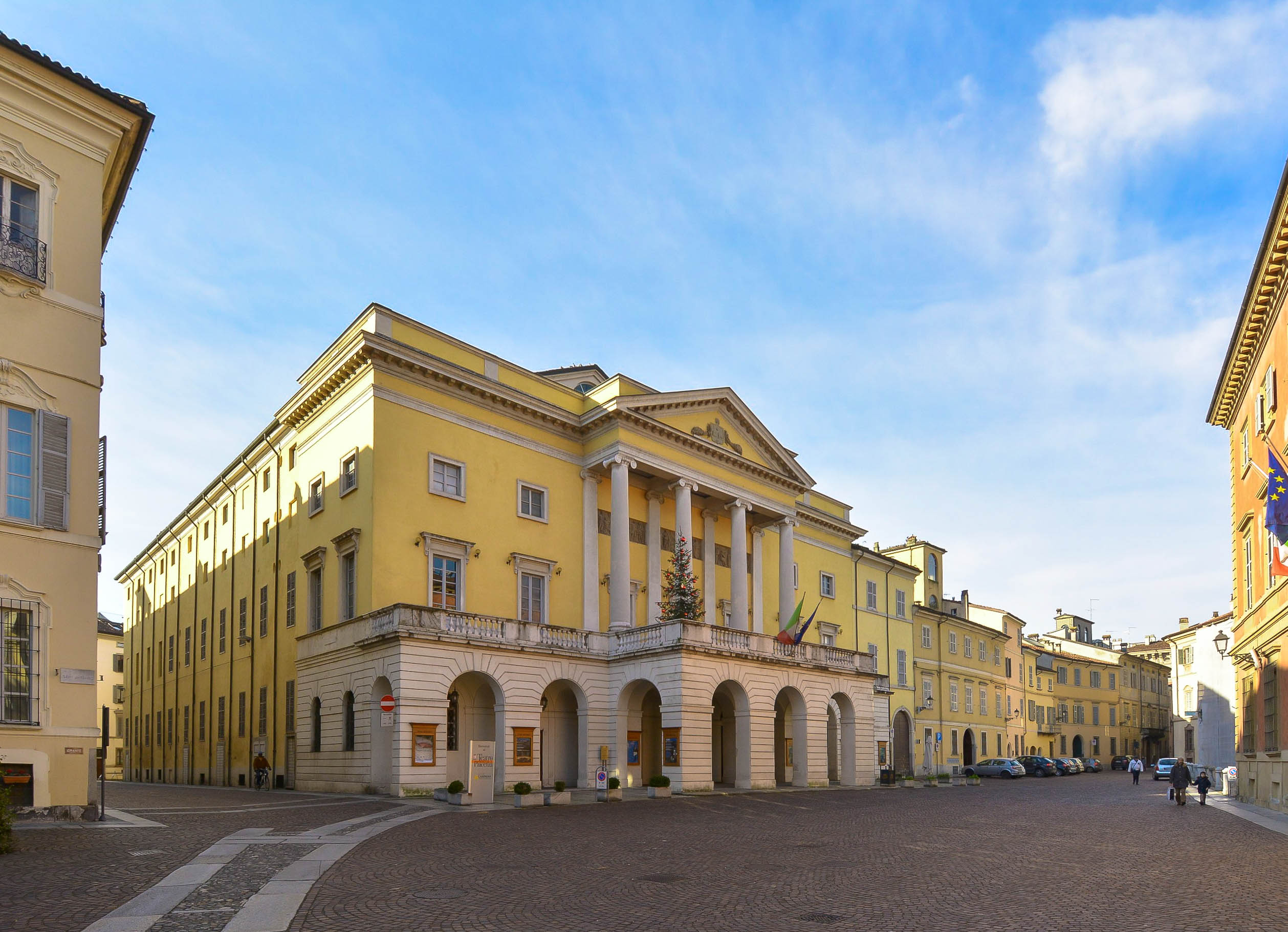

The Teatro Municipale or Municipal Theater of Piacenza is the main Neoclassical-style opera house in the city, located on Via Verdi #41, facing Piazza Sant'Antonino and flanking the Palazzo Anguissola di Cimafava Rocca in Piacenza, Italy.

== Description ==
The theater was commissioned in 1803 by the town nobility, and designed by Lotario Tomba, in order to substitute the Duchal Theater that had been present inside the Citadel, but was destroyed by a fire on December 24, 1798. The cost was 319,217 franchi. By 1804, the theater was inaugurated with the premier of Zamori, ossia l'Eroe delle Indie written by Giovanni Simone Mayr. The theater the earliest public opera house in the region of Emilia. Sometime after 1816, Alessandro Sanquirico was invited to refurbish the stage.

The elliptical interior was designed by Tomba. The interiors were decorated by a large team or artists including Andrea Guidotti, Paolo Bozzini, Antonio Borea, Luigi Labò, Giuseppe Scaglia, Francesco Puttinati, Gerolamo Magnani, and Domenico Menozzi.
