= Piacenza =

Comune in Emilia-Romagna, Italy

Piacenza Piaṡëinsa (Emilian)
- Comune
- Comune di Piacenza
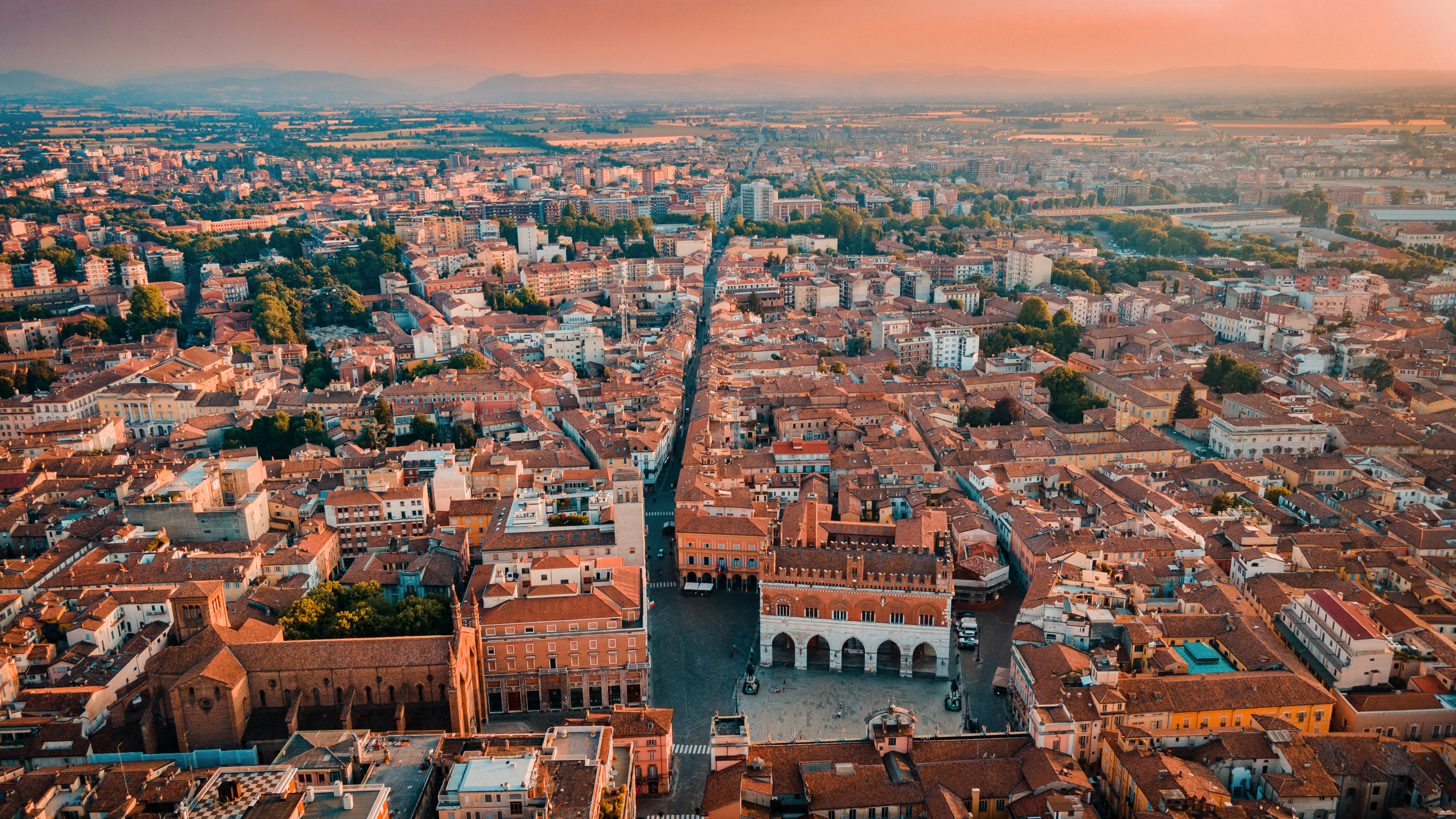
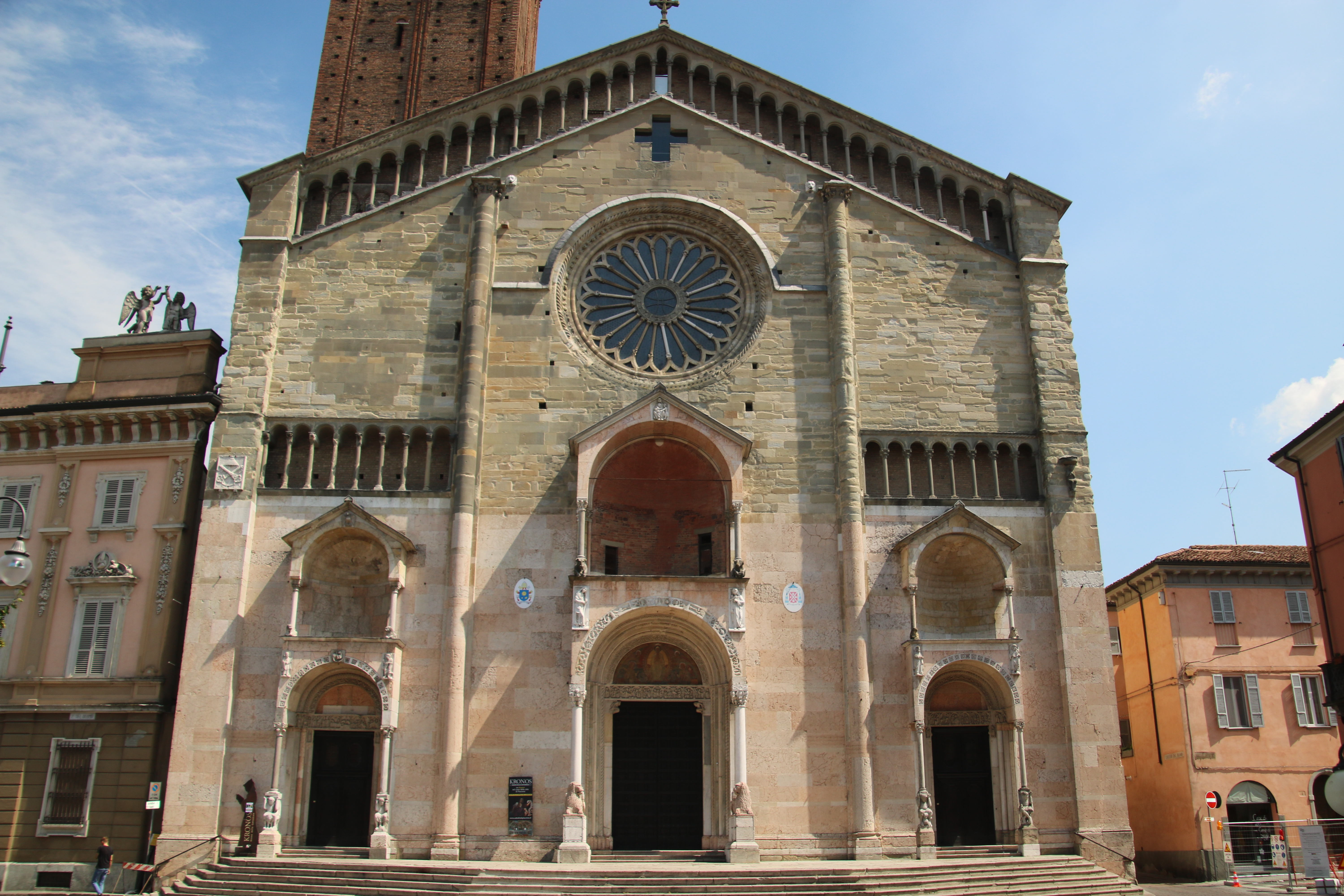
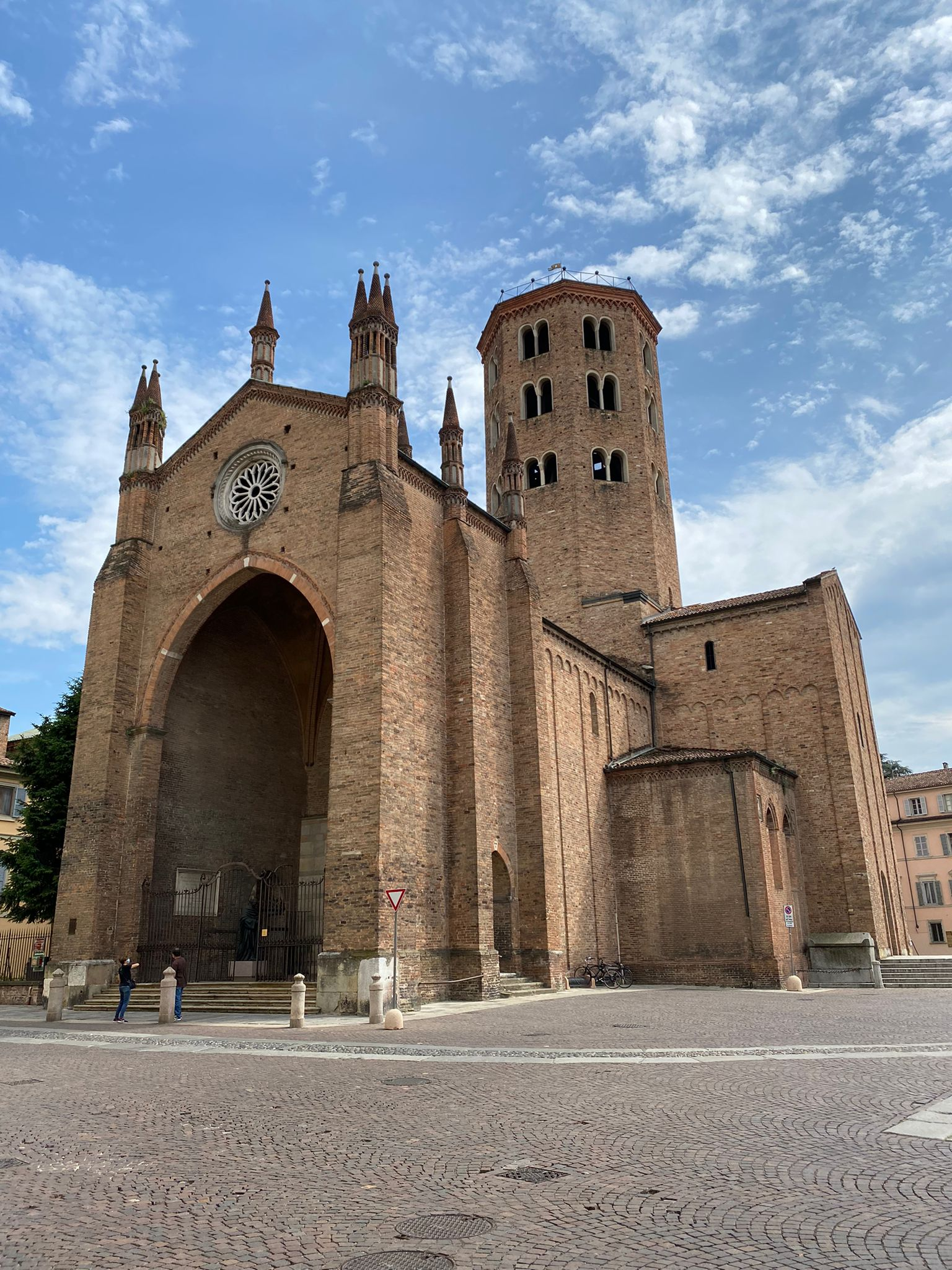
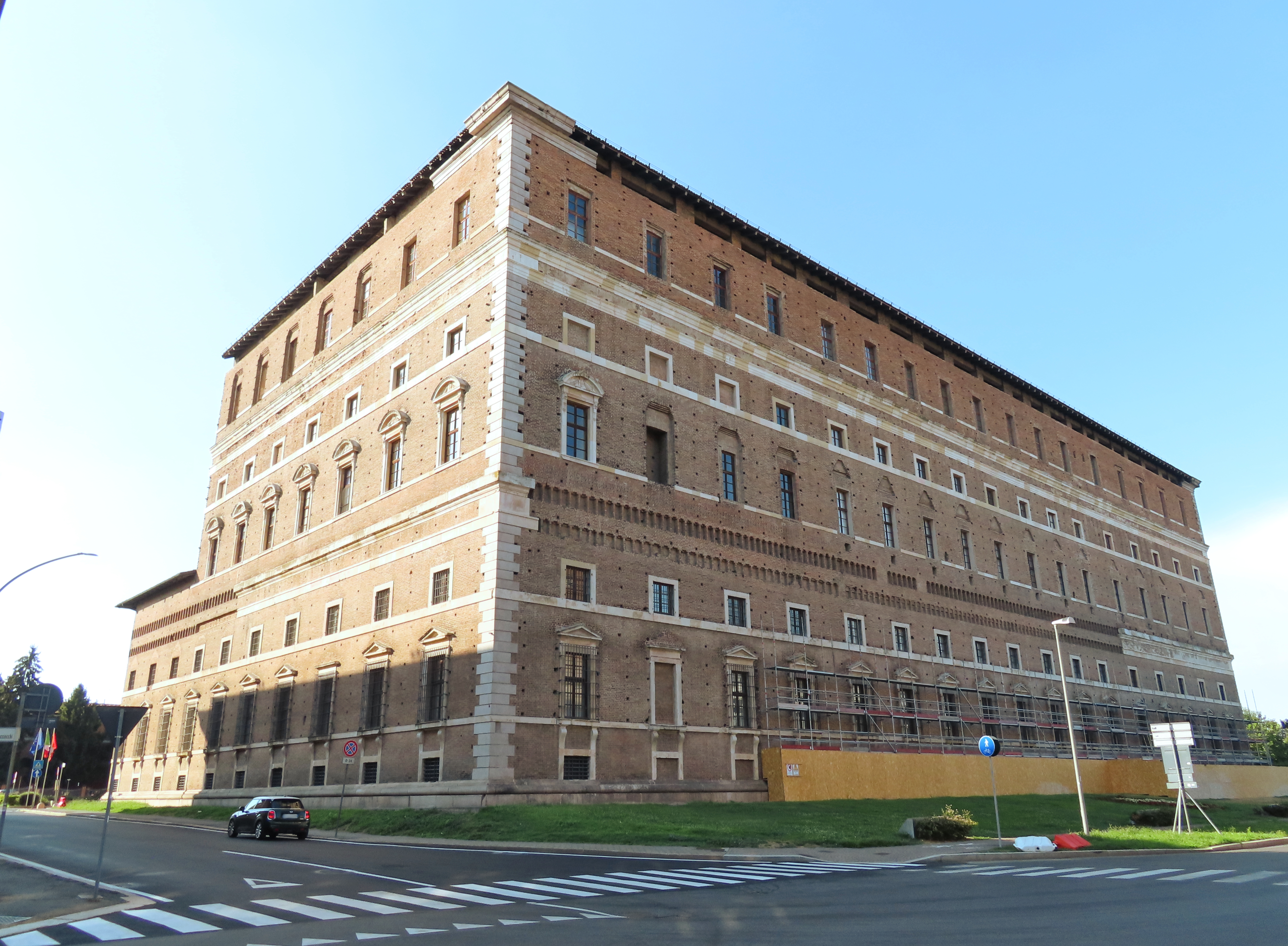
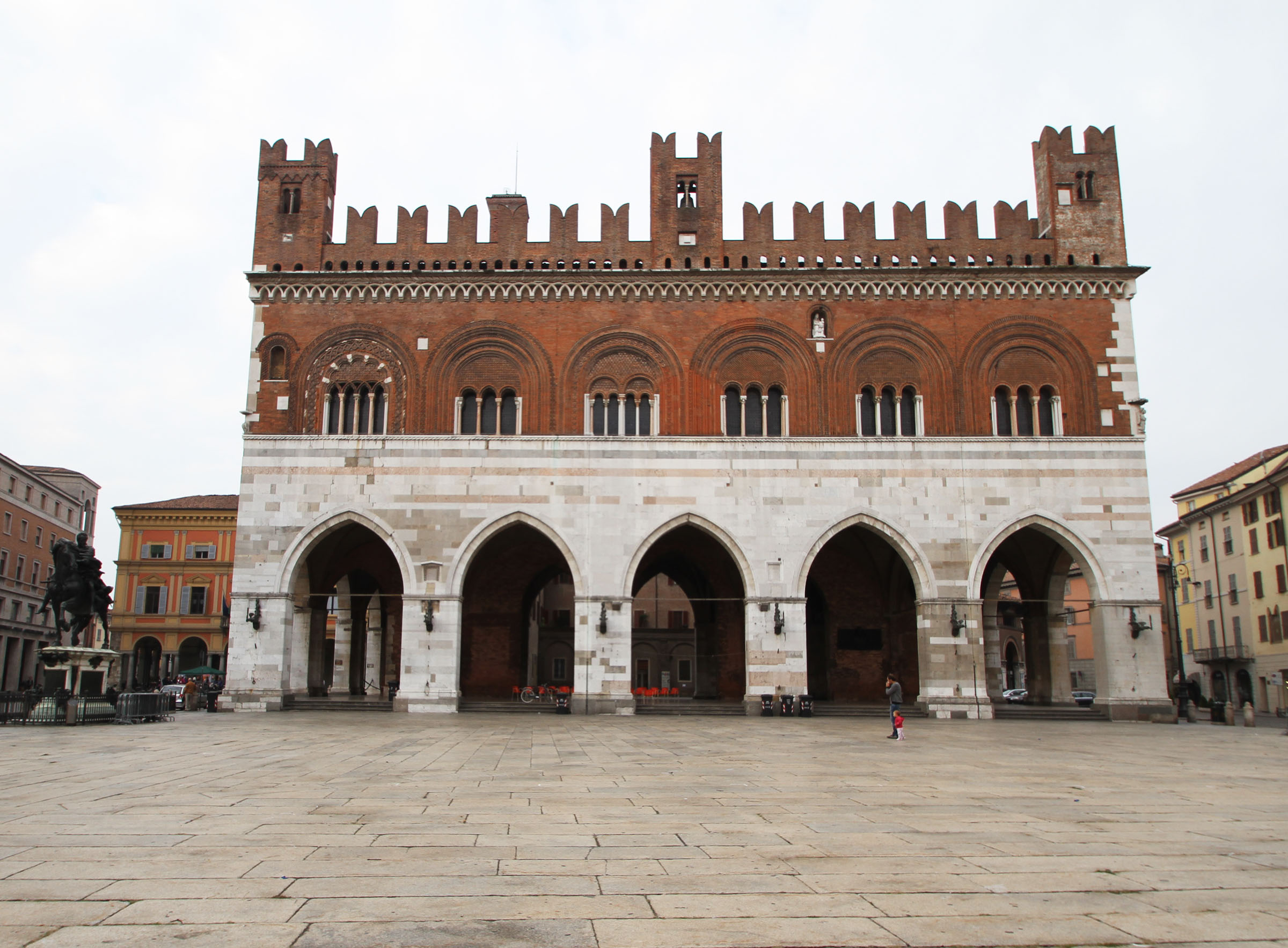
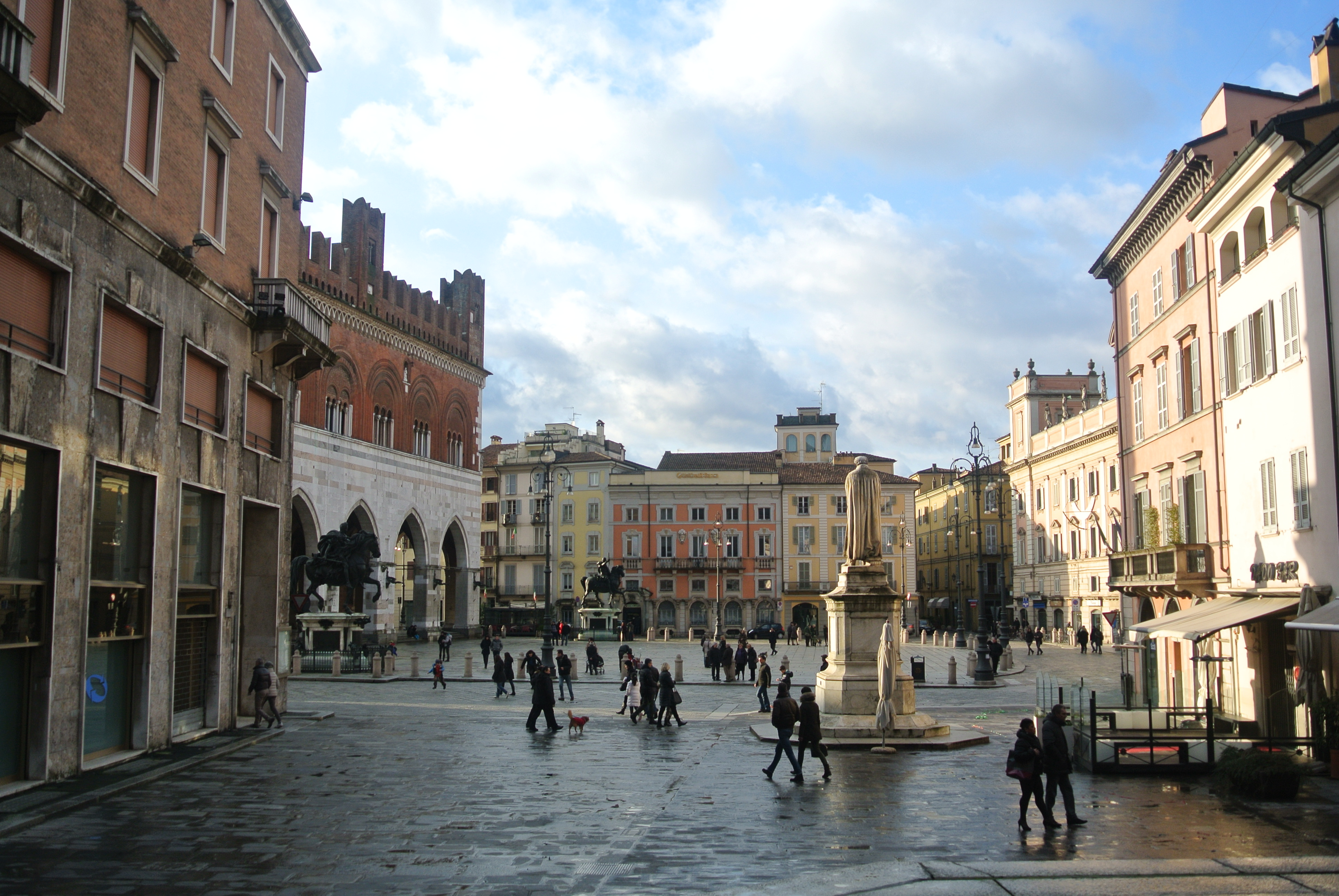
- Aerial view Duomo di Piacenza Sant'Antonino Palazzo Farnese Palazzo Comunale Piazza dei Cavalli

- Flag Coat of arms

- Location within Italy Location within Emilia-Romagna
- Coordinates: 45°2′52″N 9°42′2″E
- Country: Italy
- Region: Emilia-Romagna
- Province: Piacenza (PC)
- Founded: May 218 BC
- Frazioni: Vallera, San Bonico, Pittolo, La Verza, Mucinasso, I Vaccari, Roncaglia, Montale, Borghetto, Le Mose, Mortizza, Gerbido

Government
  - Mayor: Katia Tarasconi (PD)

Area
  - Total: 118.24 km^{2} (45.65 sq mi)
- Elevation: 61 m (200 ft)

Population (2026)
  - Total: 103,737
  - Density: 877.34/km^{2} (2,272.3/sq mi)
- Demonym: Piacentino
- Time zone: UTC+1 (CET)
  - Summer (DST): UTC+2 (CEST)
- Postal code: 29121-29122
- Dialing code: 0523
- Patron saint: Antonino of Piacenza (4 July), Giustina
- Website: Official website

Piacenza (Italian: [pjaˈtʃɛntsa]; Piacentino: Piaṡëinsa [pi.aˈzəi̯sɐ]; Latin: Placentia) is a city and comune (municipality) in the region of Emilia-Romagna in northern Italy, and the capital of the province of Piacenza. With a population of 103,737 as of 2026, Piacenza is the 9th-largest city in the region and the 43rd-largest in Italy.

The westernmost major city of the region of Emilia-Romagna, it has strong relations with Lombardy, with which it borders, and in particular with Milan. It was defined by Leonardo da Vinci as a "Land of passage" in his Codex Atlanticus, by virtue of its crucial geographical location. This strategic location would significantly influence the history of Piacenza.

Piacenza integrates characteristics of the nearby Ligurian and Piedmontese territories with a prevalent Lombard influence, favored by communications with the nearby metropolis, which attenuates its Emilian footprint.

Piacenza is located at a major crossroads at the intersection of Route E35/A1 between Bologna and Milan, and Route E70/A21 between Brescia and Turin. Piacenza is also at the confluence of the Trebbia, draining the northern Apennine Mountains, and the River Po, draining to the east.

Piacenza hosts three universities, Università Cattolica del Sacro Cuore, Polytechnic University of Milan and the University of Parma.

== Etymology ==
The etymology is long-standing, deriving from the Latin "Placentia" tracing an origin from the verb placēre, "to please". The name means "pleasant" or (as James Boswell reported some of the etymologists of his time to have translated it) "comely abode", and it was given as a good omen.

== History ==
=== Ancient history ===
==== Pre-Roman era ====
Before its settlement by the Romans, the area was populated by other peoples; specifically, just prior to the Roman settlement, the region on the right bank of the Po River between the Trebbia River and the Taro River had been occupied by the Ananes or Anamari, a tribe of Cisalpine Gauls. Before then, according to Polybius, "These plains were anciently inhabited by Etruscans" before the Gauls took the entire Po Valley from them.

==== Roman age ====
in May 218 BC, Piacenza and Cremona were founded as Roman military colonies. The Romans had planned to construct them after the successful conclusion of the latest war with the Gauls ending in 219 BC. In the spring of 218 BC, after declaring war on Carthage, the Senate decided to accelerate the foundation and gave the colonists 30 days to appear on the sites to receive their lands. Each colony was to be settled by 6,000 Roman citizens, but the cities were to receive Latin Rights; that is, they were to have the same legal status as the many colonies that had been co-founded by Rome and towns of Latium.

The reaction of the region's Gauls was swift; they drove the colonists off the lands. Taking refuge in Mutina, the colonists sent for military assistance. A small force under Lucius Manlius was prevented from reaching the area. The Senate then sent two legions under Gaius Atelius. Collecting Manlius and the colonists, they descended on Piacenza and Cremona and successfully placed castra there of 480 square metres (0.12 acres) to support the building of the city. Piacenza must have been walled immediately, as the walls were in place when the Battle of the Trebia was fought around the city in December. There is no evidence either textual or archaeological of a prior settlement at that exact location; however, such a site would have been obliterated by construction. Piacenza was the fifty-third colony to be placed by Rome following its foundation. It was the first among the Gauls of the Po valley.

It had to be supplied by boat after the Battle of Trebbia, when Hannibal controlled the countryside, for which purpose a port (Emporium) was constructed. In 209 BC, Hasdrubal Barca crossed the Alps and laid siege to the city, but he was unable to take it, and he withdrew. In 200 BC, the Gauls sacked and burned the city, selling the inhabitants into slavery. Subsequently, the victorious Romans restored the city and managed to recover 2,000 of its citizens. In 198 BC, a combined force of Gauls and Ligurians plundered the whole region. As the people had never recovered from being sold into slavery, in 190 BC, they complained to Senate of underpopulation; in response the Senate sent 3,000 new settlers. Construction of the Via Aemilia in the decade of the 180s made the city easily accessible from the Adriatic ports, which improved trade and the prospects for timely defense.

The Liver of Piacenza, a bronze model of a sheep's liver for the purposes of haruspicy, was discovered in 1877 at Gossolengo just to the south of Piacenza. It bears witness to the survival of the disciplina Etrusca well after the Roman conquest.

Although sacked and devastated several times, the city always recovered and by the sixth century Procopius was calling it "the principal city in the country of Aemilia".

The first Bishop of Piacenza (322–357), San Vittorio, declared Saint Antoninus of Piacenza, a soldier of the Theban Legion (and not to be confused with the sixth-century Antoninus of Piacenza), the patron saint of Piacenza and had the first basilica constructed to honor the saint in 324. The basilica was restored in 903 and rebuilt in 1101, again in 1562, and is still a church today. The remains of the bishop and the soldier-saint are in urns under the altar. The theme of Antoninus, protector of Piacenza, is well known in art.

=== Middle Ages ===
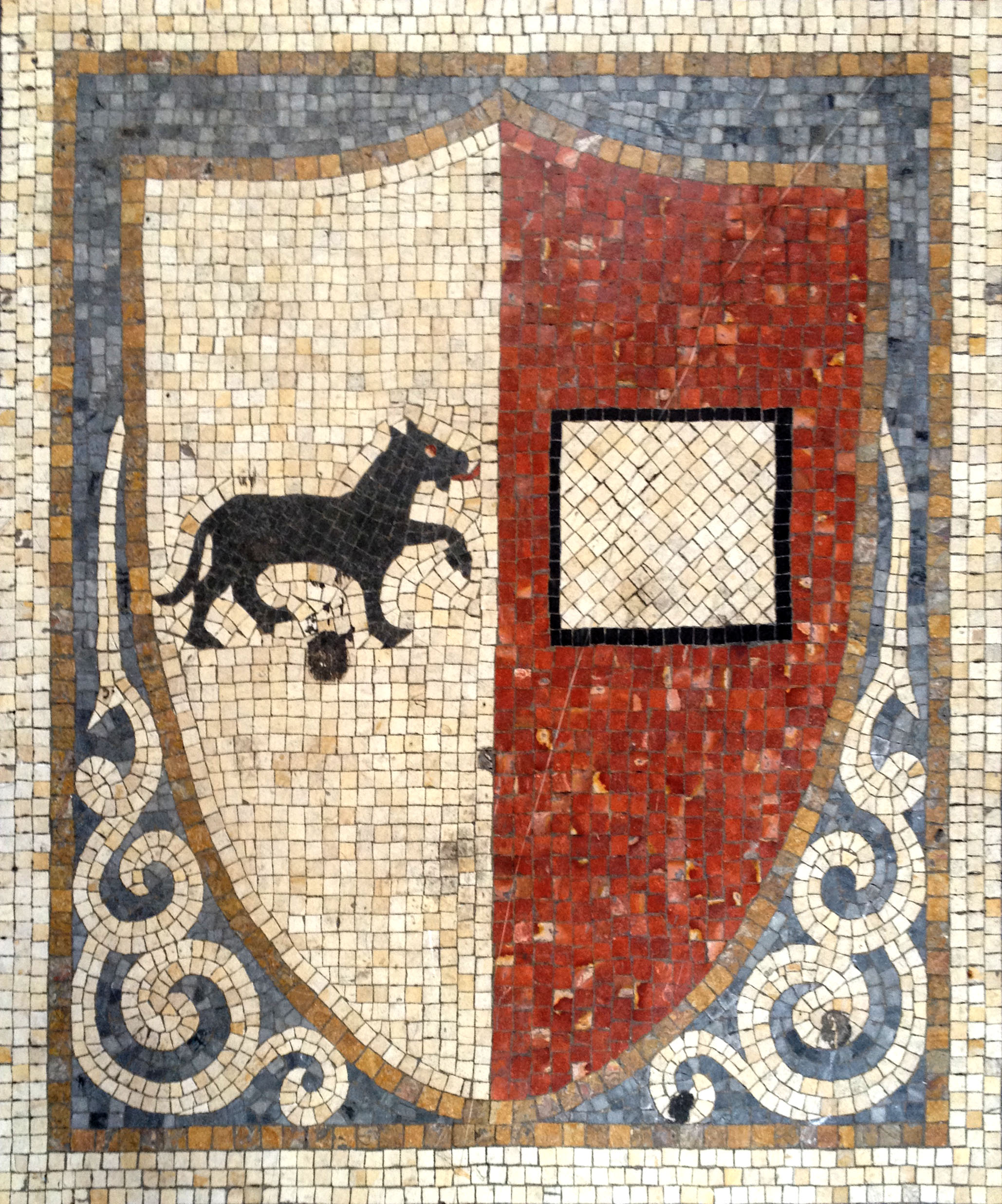
Mosaic of the old coat of arms for the city, bearing a horse with one raised leg

Piacenza was sacked during the course of the Gothic War (535–554). After a short period of being reconquered by the Roman emperor Justinian I, it was conquered by the Lombards, who made it a duchy seat. After its conquest by Francia in the ninth century, the city began to recover, aided by its location along the Via Francigena that later connected the Holy Roman Empire with Rome. Its population and importance grew further after the year 1000. That period marked a gradual transfer of governing powers from the feudal lords to a new enterprising class, as well to the feudal class of the countryside.

In 1095, the city was the site of the Council of Piacenza, in which the First Crusade was proclaimed. From 1126, Piacenza was a free commune and an important member of the Lombard League. In this role, it took part in the war against Frederick I, Holy Roman Emperor and in the subsequent battle of Legnano (1176). It also successfully fought the neighbouring communes of Cremona, Pavia, and Parma, expanding its territory. Piacenza also captured control of the trading routes with Genoa, where the first Piacentini bankers had already settled, from the Malaspina counts and the bishop of Bobbio.

In the thirteenth century, despite unsuccessful wars against Frederick I, Piacenza managed to gain strongholds on the Lombardy shore of the Po. The preliminaries of the Peace of Constance were signed in 1183 in the Saint Antoninus church. Agriculture and trade flourished in these centuries and Piacenza became one of the richest cities in Europe. This is reflected in the construction of many important buildings and in the general revision of the urban plan. Struggles for control were commonplace in the second half of the thirteenth century, similarly to the large majority of Medieval Italian communes. The Scotti family, Pallavicini family and Alberto Scoto (1290–1313) in that order, held power during the period. Scoto's government ended when the Visconti of Milan captured Piacenza, which they would hold until 1447. Duke Gian Galeazzo Visconti rewrote Piacenza's statutes and relocated the University of Pavia to the city. Piacenza then became a possession of the House of Sforza until 1499.

=== Modern era ===
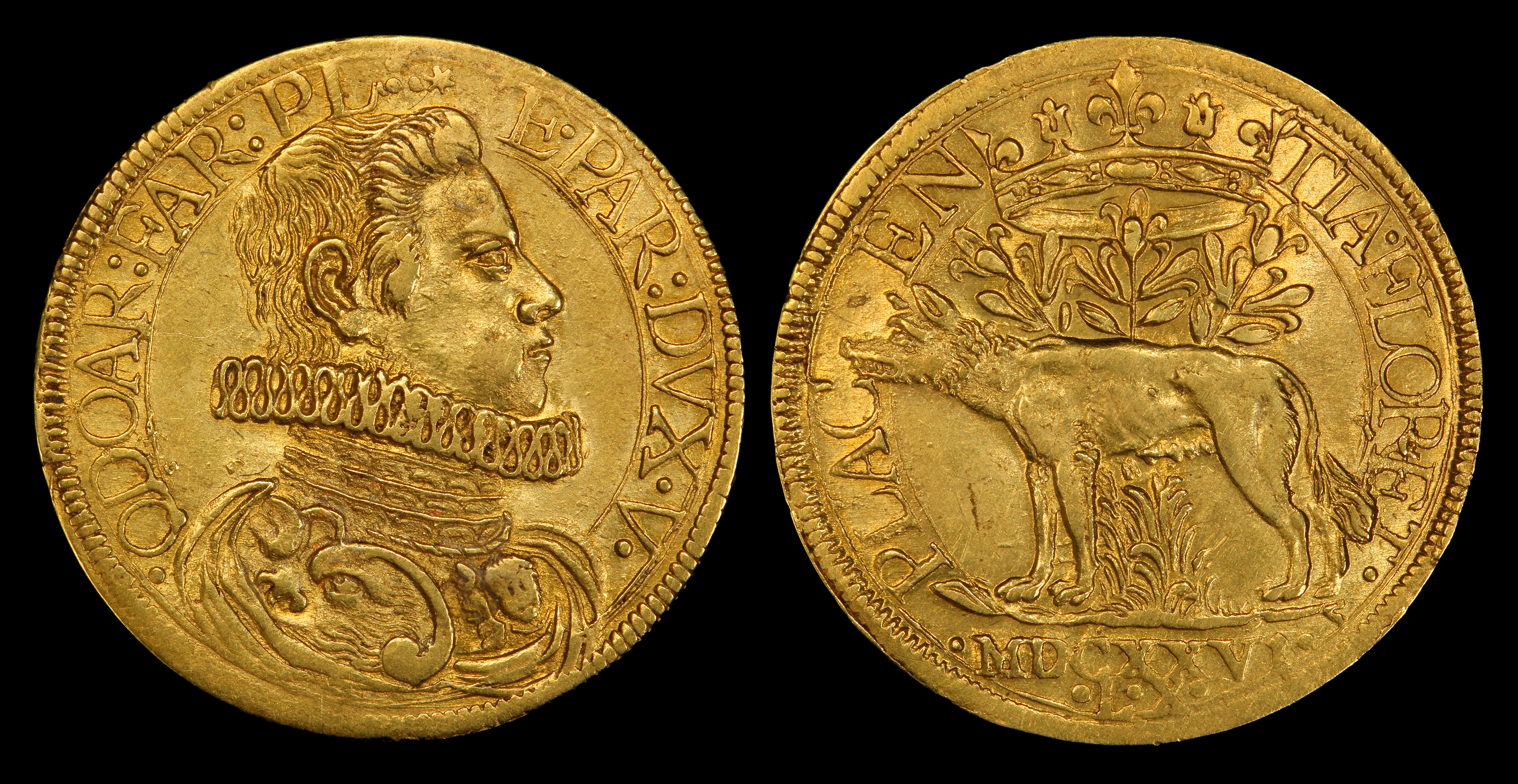
Two gold Doppie (1626) depicting Odoardo Farnese (obv) and Placentia floret ("Piacenza flourishes") (rev)

Chiefly due to the expansion of agriculture in the countryside surrounding Piacenza, the city progressed economically and a coin from the seventeenth century (that is displayed to the right) declares that by featuring the motto: Placentia floret ("Piacenza flourishes") on one of its sides. Also in the course of that century a new city wall was erected. Piacenza, as part of the Duchy of Milan, was ruled, at alternate times, by the Sforza and by France until 1521, when, under Pope Leo X, it became part of the Papal States. From 1545, following the creation of the Duchy of Parma and Piacenza by Pope Paul III to his son Pier Luigi Farnese, the city was ruled by the House of Farnese.

Piacenza was the capital city of the duchy until Ottavio Farnese, Duke of Parma (1547–1586), moved the capital to Parma. The city underwent some of its most difficult years during the rule of Odoardo Farnese, Duke of Parma (1622–1646). Out of the population of 30,000 in the city between 6,000 and 13,000 Piacentini died from famine and plague. The city and its countryside were ravaged by bandits and French soldiers as well.

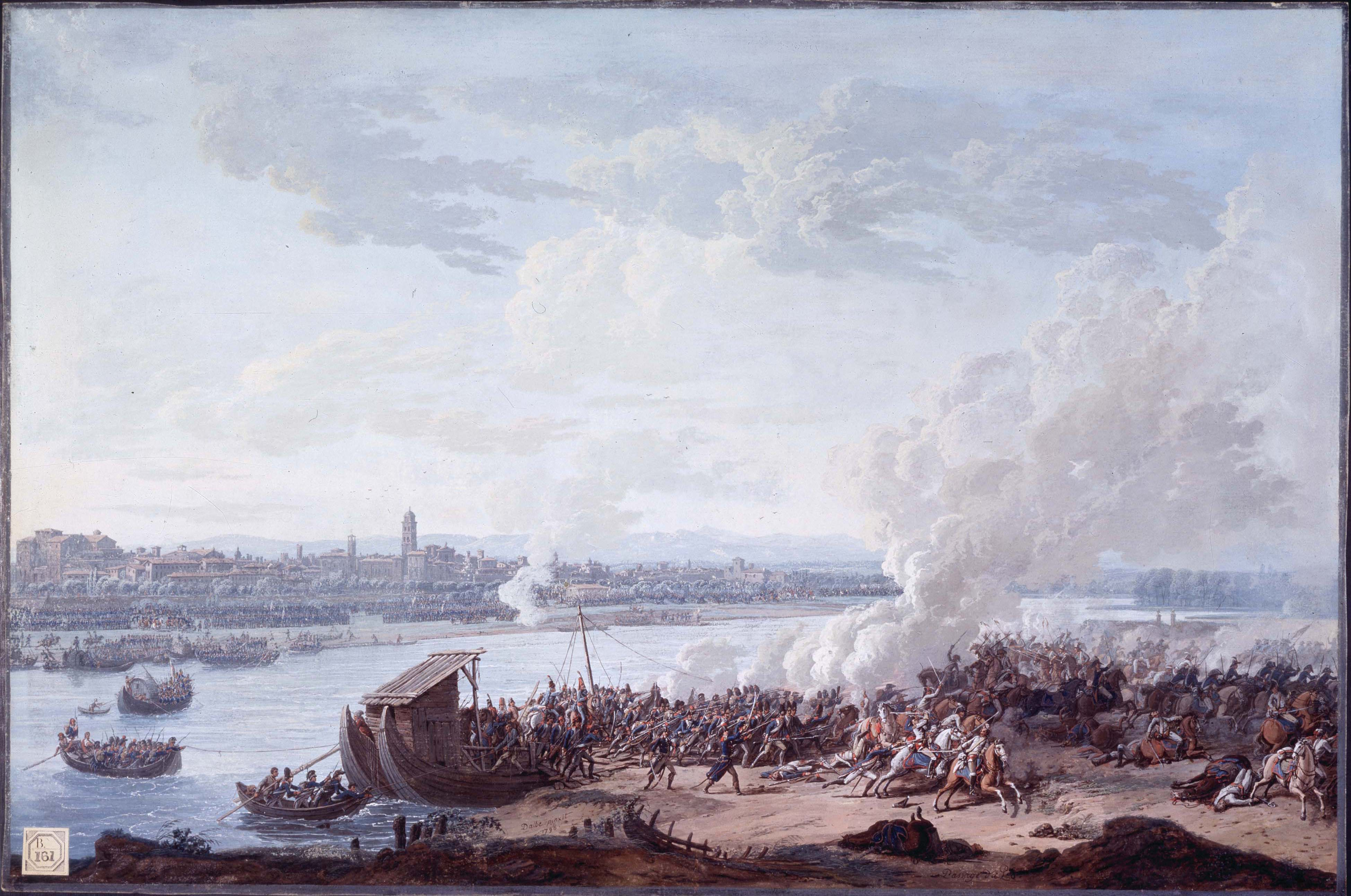
The French Pass the River Po at Piacenza, by Giuseppe Pietro Bagetti, 1803

Between 1732 and 1859, Parma and Piacenza were ruled by the House of Bourbon. In the eighteenth century, several edifices that belonged to noble families such as Scotti, Landi, and Fogliani were built in Piacenza.

In 1802, Napoleon's army annexed Piacenza to the French Empire. Young Piacentini recruits were sent to fight in Russia, Spain, and Germany, while the city was plundered of a great number of artworks that are currently exhibited in many French museums.

The Habsburg government of Marie Louise, Duchess of Parma (1816–1847), is remembered fondly as one of the best in the history of Piacenza. The duchess drained many lands, built several bridges across the Trebbia and the Nure and created educational and artistic activities.

=== Union with Italy ===
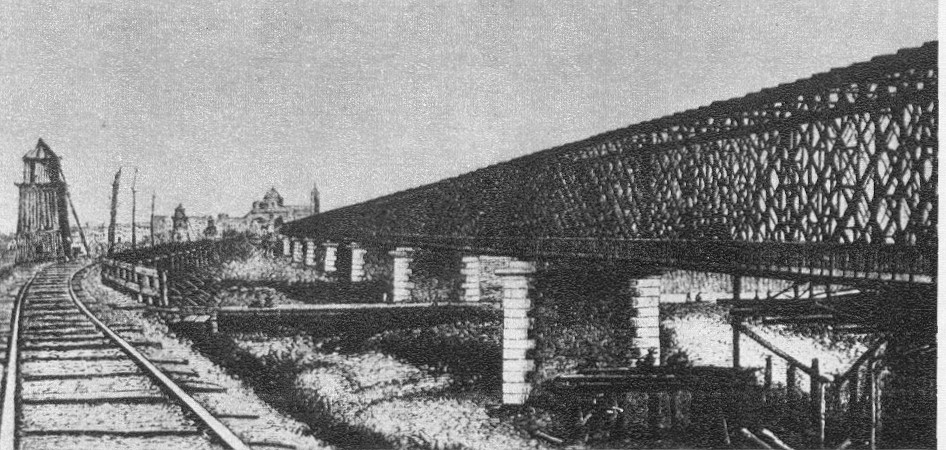
Piacenza railway bridge over Po river in a 19th-century image

Austrian troops occupied Piacenza until, in 1860, a plebiscite marked the entrance of the city into the Kingdom of Sardinia. When 37,089 voters out of 37,585 voted for the annexation, Piacenza was declared Primogenita dell'Unità di Italia ("First-born of the Unification of Italy") by the monarch. The Piacentini enrolled en masse in Giuseppe Garibaldi's army for the Expedition of the Thousand.

In 1858, the geologist Karl Mayer-Eymar named the Piacenzian Age of the Pliocene Epoch based on deposits close to Piacenza.

In June 1865, the first railway bridge over the Po River in northern Italy was inaugurated (in southern Italy a railroad bridge had been built across the river in 1839). In 1891, the first Chamber of Workers was created in Piacenza.

=== World War II ===
During World War II, the city was heavily bombed by the Allies because of its strategic elements. The important railway and road bridges across the Trebbia and the Po and the railway yards were destroyed. The historic centre of city suffered collateral damage. In 1944, the bridges over the Po became vital for the supply from Austria of Field Marshal Albert Kesselring's Gothic Line, which protected the withdrawal of Kesselring's troops from Italy. Foremost among these were the railway and road bridges at Piacenza, along with supply depots and railway yards. In Operation Mallory Major, July 12–15, allied medium bombers from Corsica flew 300 sorties a day, knocking out 21 bridges east of Piacenza and then continued to the west for a total of 90 by July 20. Fighter-bombers prevented reconstruction and cut roads and rail lines. By August 4, all the cities of northern Italy were isolated and had suffered heavy bombing, especially Piacenza. Transport to Genoa to the south or through Turin to the north was impossible; nevertheless, Kesselring continued to supply his men.

On the hills and the Apennine Mountains, partisans were active. On April 25, 1945, a general partisan insurrection by the Italian resistance movement broke out and on 29 April, troops of the Brazilian Expeditionary Force entered the city. In 1996, president Oscar Luigi Scalfaro honoured Piacenza with the gold medal for Valour in Battle.

There was a prisoner of war (POW) camp located in Piacenza, Veano Camp PG 29.

== Geography ==
=== Climate ===
Climate in this area is humid subtropical with no dry season, constantly moist. Summers are hot and sultry. The Köppen Climate Classification subtype for this climate is "Cfa" (Humid subtropical climate).

Climate data for Piacenza urbana, elevation 71 m (233 ft), (1991–2020 normals, extremes 1878–2013)
Month	Jan	Feb	Mar	Apr	May	Jun	Jul	Aug	Sep	Oct	Nov	Dec	Year
Record high °C (°F)	22.3 (72.1)	23.5 (74.3)	28.1 (82.6)	30.9 (87.6)	34.8 (94.6)	36.9 (98.4)	40.4 (104.7)	39.7 (103.5)	34.7 (94.5)	29.2 (84.6)	21.4 (70.5)	18.4 (65.1)	40.4 (104.7)
Mean daily maximum °C (°F)	6.4 (43.5)	9.5 (49.1)	15.3 (59.5)	19.3 (66.7)	24.3 (75.7)	28.5 (83.3)	30.9 (87.6)	30.4 (86.7)	25.3 (77.5)	18.3 (64.9)	11.5 (52.7)	6.6 (43.9)	18.9 (65.9)
Daily mean °C (°F)	3.0 (37.4)	5.0 (41.0)	9.8 (49.6)	13.9 (57.0)	18.6 (65.5)	22.8 (73.0)	25.0 (77.0)	24.7 (76.5)	20.1 (68.2)	14.4 (57.9)	8.5 (47.3)	3.7 (38.7)	14.1 (57.4)
Mean daily minimum °C (°F)	−0.4 (31.3)	0.5 (32.9)	4.3 (39.7)	8.5 (47.3)	13.0 (55.4)	17.0 (62.6)	19.1 (66.4)	19.0 (66.2)	14.9 (58.8)	10.5 (50.9)	5.4 (41.7)	0.7 (33.3)	9.4 (48.9)
Record low °C (°F)	−21.0 (−5.8)	−21.0 (−5.8)	−12.2 (10.0)	−4.0 (24.8)	−0.6 (30.9)	5.4 (41.7)	8.0 (46.4)	7.3 (45.1)	3.6 (38.5)	−4.0 (24.8)	−9.1 (15.6)	−16.9 (1.6)	−21.0 (−5.8)
Average precipitation mm (inches)	39.7 (1.56)	49.3 (1.94)	51.3 (2.02)	72.5 (2.85)	71.8 (2.83)	67.4 (2.65)	36.5 (1.44)	49.2 (1.94)	85.7 (3.37)	99.9 (3.93)	113.8 (4.48)	52.5 (2.07)	789.6 (31.08)
Average relative humidity (%)	86	83	75	78	76	75	73	75	78	85	88	89	80
Source 1: Arpae Emilia-Romagna
Source 2: Temperature estreme in Toscana (extremes) Il Meteo (humidity)

Climate data for Piacenza (LIPS) (1991–2020 normals, extremes 1951–present)
Month	Jan	Feb	Mar	Apr	May	Jun	Jul	Aug	Sep	Oct	Nov	Dec	Year
Record high °C (°F)	23.8 (74.8)	24.6 (76.3)	28.0 (82.4)	29.4 (84.9)	34.2 (93.6)	37.2 (99.0)	39.4 (102.9)	40.4 (104.7)	34.0 (93.2)	30.4 (86.7)	22.2 (72.0)	19.6 (67.3)	40.4 (104.7)
Mean daily maximum °C (°F)	6.3 (43.3)	8.8 (47.8)	14.3 (57.7)	18.2 (64.8)	23.2 (73.8)	27.8 (82.0)	30.3 (86.5)	30.0 (86.0)	24.8 (76.6)	17.8 (64.0)	11.3 (52.3)	6.7 (44.1)	18.3 (64.9)
Daily mean °C (°F)	2.5 (36.5)	3.9 (39.0)	8.3 (46.9)	12.4 (54.3)	17.3 (63.1)	21.7 (71.1)	24.0 (75.2)	23.8 (74.8)	19.0 (66.2)	13.6 (56.5)	8.0 (46.4)	3.2 (37.8)	13.1 (55.7)
Mean daily minimum °C (°F)	−0.9 (30.4)	−0.6 (30.9)	2.5 (36.5)	6.4 (43.5)	11.1 (52.0)	15.3 (59.5)	17.3 (63.1)	17.5 (63.5)	13.4 (56.1)	9.6 (49.3)	4.9 (40.8)	0.2 (32.4)	8.1 (46.5)
Record low °C (°F)	−22.0 (−7.6)	−16.7 (1.9)	−12.6 (9.3)	−3.4 (25.9)	0.0 (32.0)	3.4 (38.1)	8.8 (47.8)	6.6 (43.9)	3.6 (38.5)	−5.2 (22.6)	−9.0 (15.8)	−14.0 (6.8)	−22.0 (−7.6)
Average precipitation mm (inches)	48.0 (1.89)	48.6 (1.91)	59.1 (2.33)	83.9 (3.30)	76.1 (3.00)	76.9 (3.03)	34.3 (1.35)	55.6 (2.19)	81.1 (3.19)	110.7 (4.36)	119.3 (4.70)	65.4 (2.57)	859.1 (33.82)
Average precipitation days (≥ 1.0 mm)	5.4	5.2	5.8	8.1	7.8	6.4	3.8	4.5	5.4	7.8	9.2	7.2	76.6
Average relative humidity (%)	85.3	78.8	73.4	73.9	73.5	72.7	70.8	71.5	74.7	84.1	88.2	87.3	77.9
Average dew point °C (°F)	0.4 (32.7)	0.5 (32.9)	3.4 (38.1)	7.7 (45.9)	12.1 (53.8)	15.9 (60.6)	17.4 (63.3)	17.8 (64.0)	14.2 (57.6)	11.3 (52.3)	6.7 (44.1)	1.7 (35.1)	9.1 (48.4)
Mean monthly sunshine hours	97.6	131.4	194.5	188.9	239.0	257.8	304.3	274.7	206.8	126.3	82.8	85.5	2,189.6
Source 1: NOAA (sun for 1981-2010)
Source 2: Servizio Meteorologico

== Demographics ==
Historical population
Year	Pop.	±%
1861	40,582	—
1871	45,707	+12.6%
1881	43,687	−4.4%
1901	45,508	+4.2%
1911	51,721	+13.7%
1921	57,233	+10.7%
1931	63,937	+11.7%
1936	64,210	+0.4%
1951	72,856	+13.5%
1961	88,541	+21.5%
1971	106,841	+20.7%
1981	109,039	+2.1%
1991	102,268	−6.2%
2001	95,594	−6.5%
2011	100,311	+4.9%
2021	102,364	+2.0%
Source: ISTAT

As of 2026, the population is 103,737, of which 48.7% are males, and 51.3% are females. Minors make up 15.3% of the population, and seniors make up 24.9%.

=== Immigration ===
As of 2025, immigrants make up 23.2% of the population. The 5 largest foreign countries of birth are Albania, North Macedonia, Morocco, Romania, and Egypt.

=== Dialect ===
Many inhabitants of Piacenza and the surrounding province still use Piacentino, which is a variety of the Emilian dialect the Emilian-Romagnol language. Emilian-Romagnol is a member of a different Romance subfamily (Gallo-Italic) than Standard Italian (which is an Italo-Dalmatian language) and its distinct grammar and phonology make it mutually unintelligible with that language.

Although there have been a number of notable poets and writers using Piacentino, the language has experienced a steady decline during the twentieth century due to the growing standardization of the Italian language in the national educational system.

== Sights ==
Piacenza boasts a great number of historical palaces, often characterized by splendid gardens.

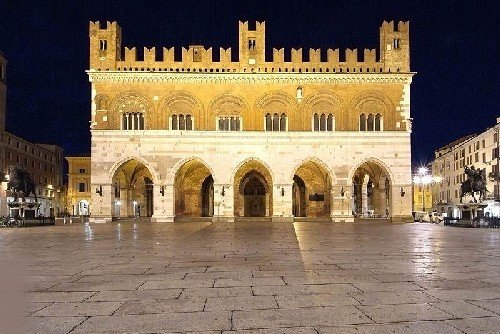
Piazza dei Cavalli and the façade of Palazzo Comunale il Gotico

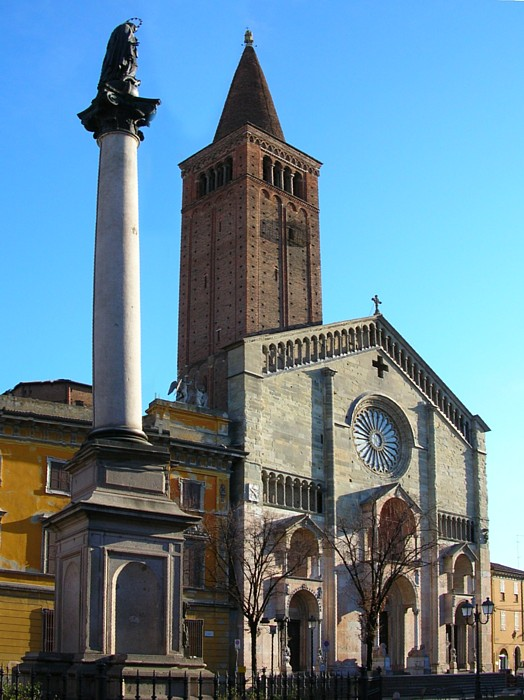
Façade of the Cathedral

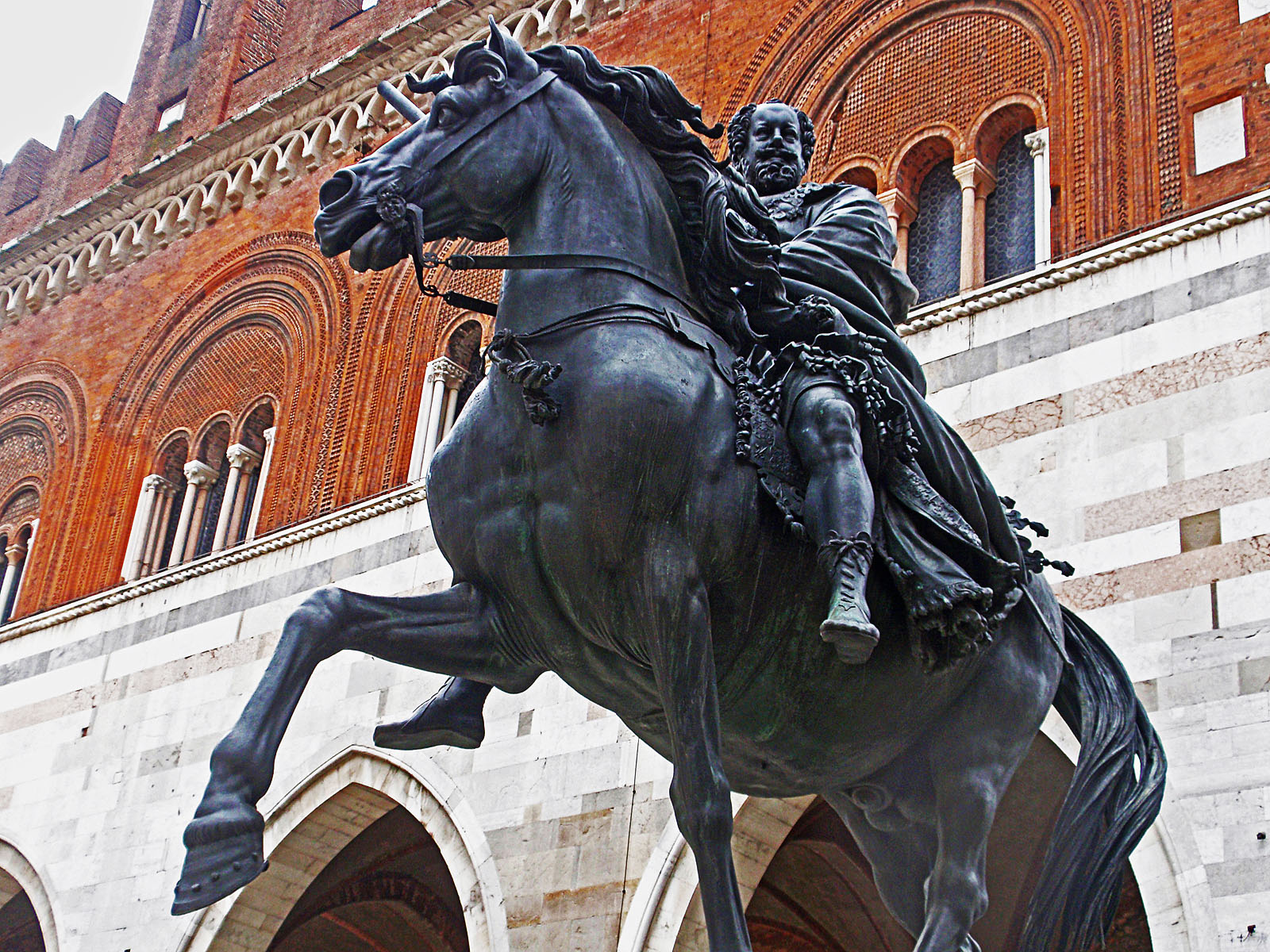
Ranuccio I Farnese monument in Piacenza

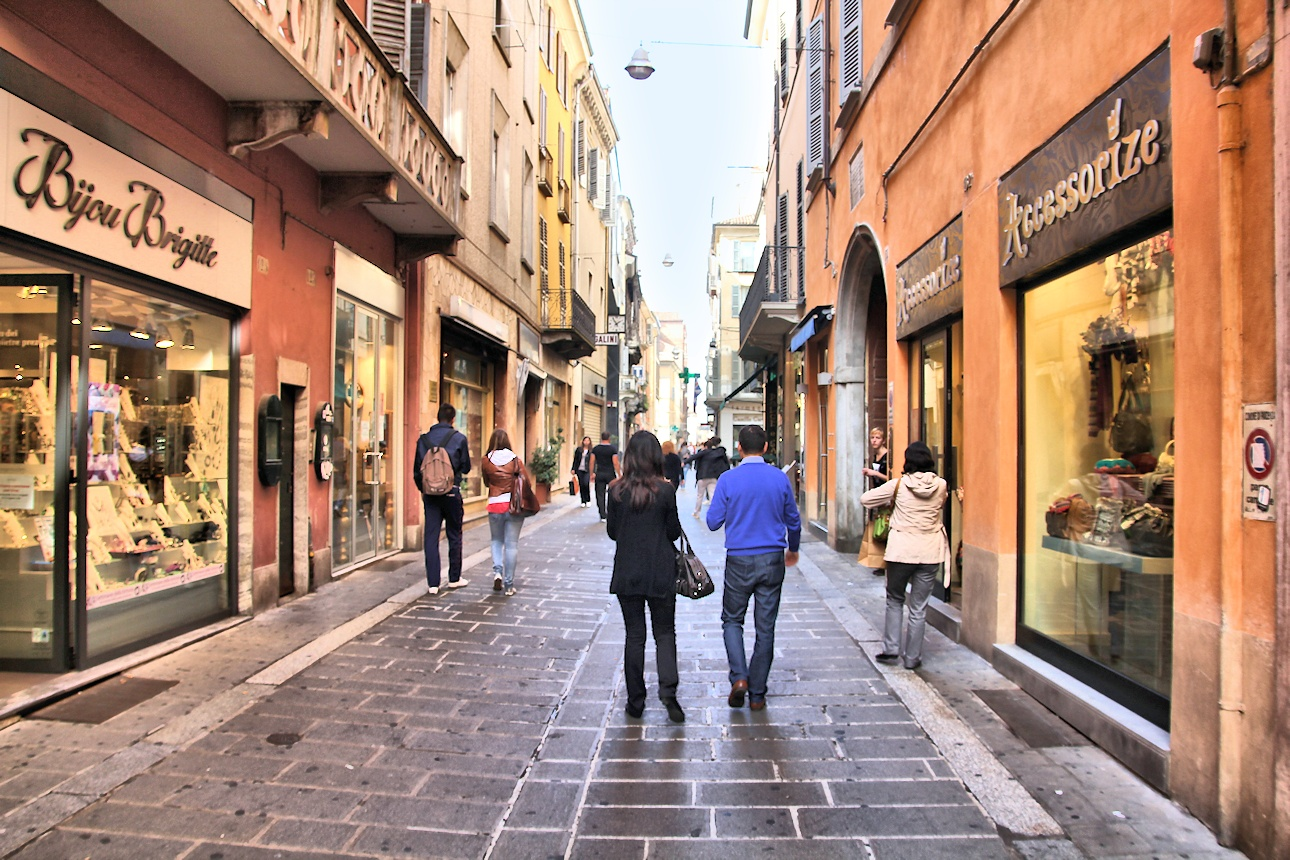
Via XX Settembre shopping street

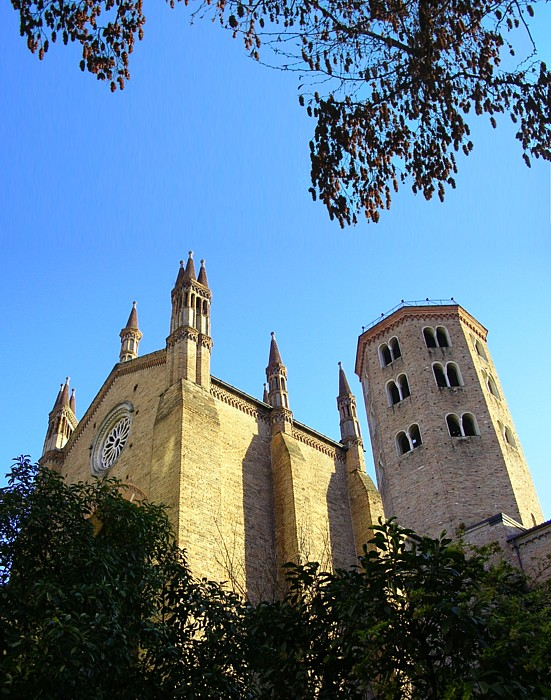
Basilica of Sant'Antonino, Piacenza, patron of Piacenza

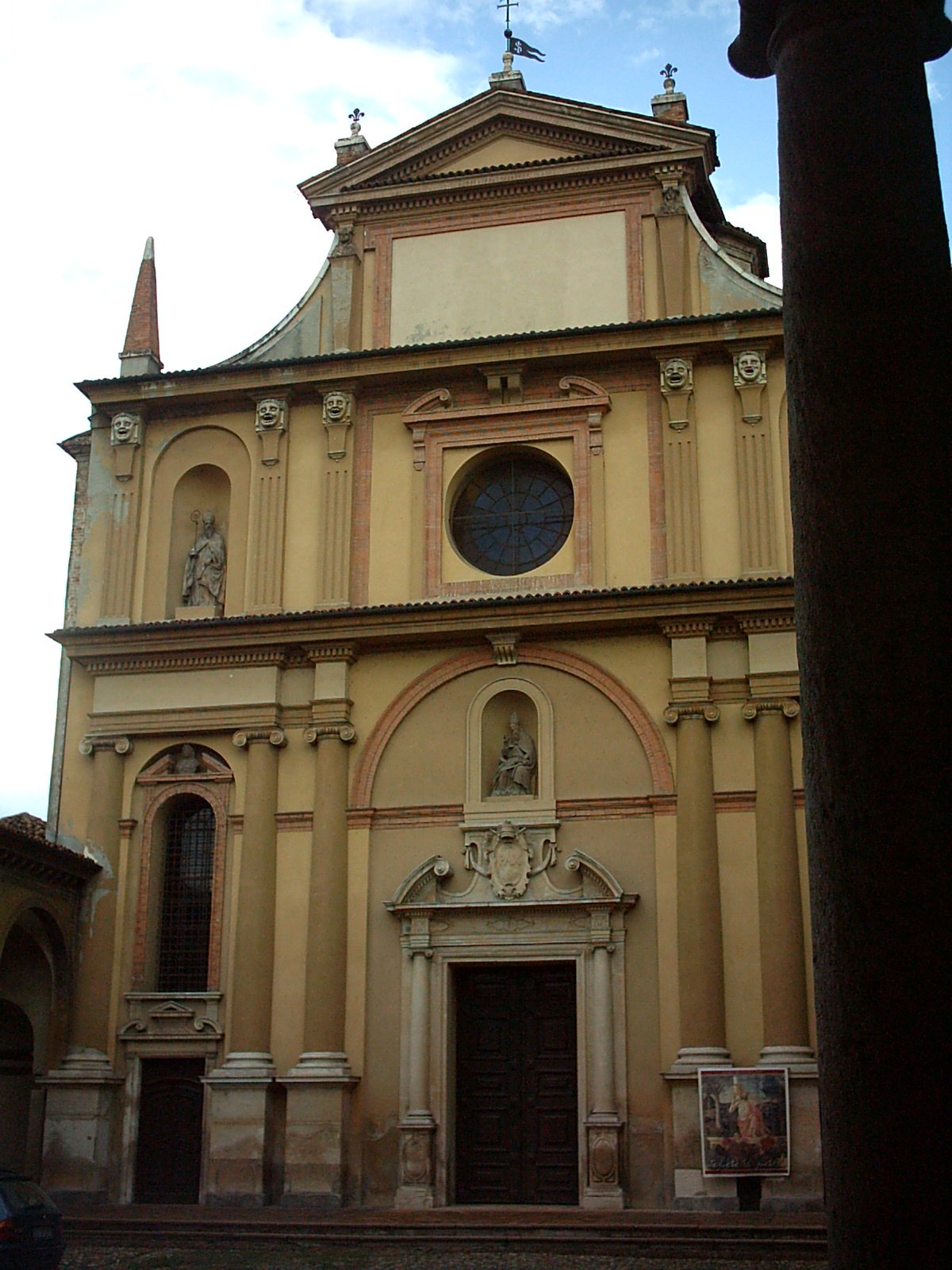
The Renaissance church of San Sisto

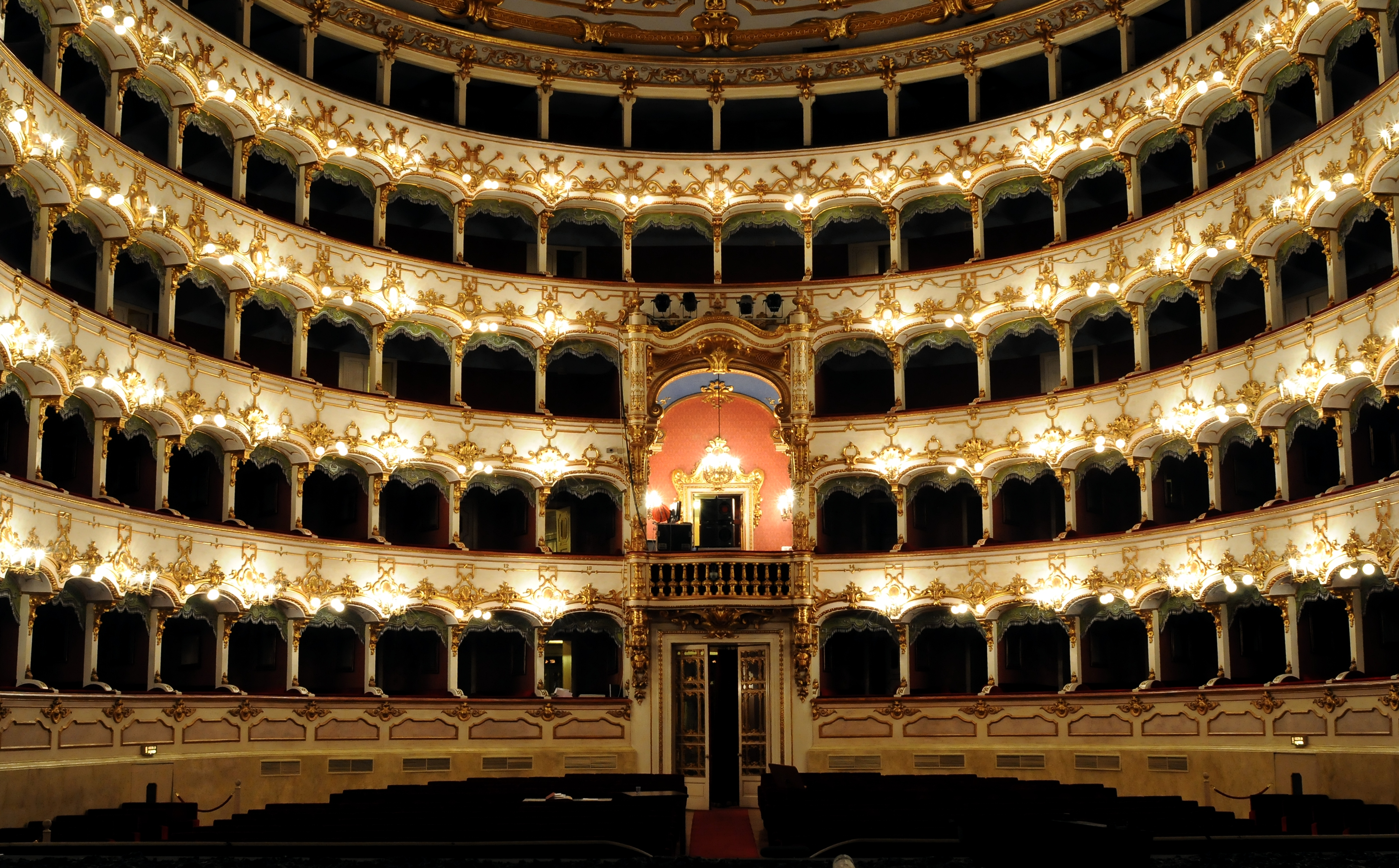
Teatro Municipale

=== Major palaces of interest ===
==== Secular buildings ====
- Piazza dei Cavalli: main square, named ("Cavalli" means "horses") for the two bronze equestrian monuments, made by the Mannerist sculptor Francesco Mochi and depicting two Farnese Dukes of Parma Alessandro and his son, Ranuccio I. The Piazza is flanked by:
  - Palazzo Comunale: also known as il Gotico, built in 1281 as the town hall or Broletto. Only the northern facade was completed in the original design, with Ghibelline merlons, ground arcades made with pink marble, upper floors in brick, and a taller central bell tower. Inside, the frescoed main hall is used for meetings, lectures, and conferences.
  - Palazzo del Collegio dei Mercanti: (17th century) current town hall
  - Palazzo del Governatore: neoclassic building, and to the east by the church of San Francesco. Near the Palazzo dei Mercanti are two fascist era buildings.
- Palazzo Farnese: begun in 1568 by Ottavio Farnese and his wife, Margaret of Parma. The initial project was designed by Francesco Paciotto, and construction pursued by Giovanni Bernardo Della Valle, Giovanni Lavezzari, and Bernardo Panizzari (Caramosino). The design was modified in 1568 by Giacomo Barozzi da Vignola, better known as "Vignola". The Civic Museums of Palazzo Farnese contain the town art gallery (Pinacoteca) and Archaeological Museum which houses the pre-Roman bronze Liver of Piacenza, an Etruscan bronze model of a sheep's liver dating from the end of the 2nd to early 1st century BC. The model was discovered in 1877 in the Piacenza hinterland. Containing writing on its surface delineating the various parts of the liver and their significance, it was likely used as an educational tool for students studying haruspicy, or divination.
- Palazzo Costa
- Palazzo Somaglia
- Palazzo Baldini: palace located on Via San Siro
- Palazzo della Prefettura or Palazzo Scotti da Vigoleno
- Palazzo Ferrari Sacchini
- Palazzo Landi (dei Tribunali): medieval palace rebuilt in its current form in the 15th century by Lombard craftsmen. It has a Renaissance marble portal. It is now seat of the local Tribunal.
- Galleria d'arte moderna Ricci Oddi: art museum dedicated mainly to modern Italian painters.
- Collegio Alberoni: Roman Catholic seminary founded by Cardinal Giulio Alberoni in the eighteenth century. The seminary maintains an art gallery that displays Alberoni's personal collection of fine tapestries and Renaissance and Baroque paintings by notable artists such as Giordano, Antonello da Messina, and Reni.

==== Religious buildings ====
- Piacenza Cathedral: main church of the Roman Catholic Diocese of Piacenza-Bobbio, built from 1122 to 1233 in northern-Italian Romanesque style. The façade, in Veronese pink marble and gilted stone, is parted horizontally by a gallery that dominates the three gates, and is decorated with Romanesque capitals and statues. Tripartite nave is supported by 25 large pillars. Frescoes by Camillo Procaccini and Ludovico Carracci cover the nave, while dome was decorated by Morazzone and Guercino. The presbytery as a wooden sculpture from 1479, a wooden choir by Giangiacomo da Genova (1471), and statues of Lombard school from the 15th century. The crypt, built on the Greek cross plan, has 108 Romanesque small columns and is home to the relics of St Justine, to which the first cathedral (that crumbled down in the 1117 Verona earthquake) was dedicated.
- San Francesco: 12th-century Romanesque-Gothic church in Piazza Cavalli. The building assumed the role of civic sanctuary in the Middle Ages. Part of the medieval cloisters remains. Lunette in main portal has a 15th-century relief depicts the Ecstasy of St. Francis. Nave and two aisles, are divided by low and sturdy brick pillars that support high gothic arches. The church has a Latin cross layout and pentahedric apse in which the aisle apses meet; decorations include 15th-16th century frescoes. In 1848, annexion of Piacenza to the Kingdom of Sardinia was announced from this church.
- Basilica of Sant'Antonino: Romanesque style church, with a large octagonal bell-tower. It was commissioned by St. Victor, first bishop of the city, in 350 CE, and completed in 375. It contains the relics of the eponymous saint, martyred near Travo, in the Val Trebbia. In 1183, delegates of Frederick Barbarossa and of the Lombard League met in the basilica for the preliminaries of peace of Constance. The church was refurbished after damage during barbarian invasions. It has a 15th-century cloister. In the interior, the main artworks are the frescoes by Camillo Gervasetti (1622).
- San Savino: Basilica church dedicated to St. Victor's successor, begun in 903 but consecrated only in 1107. The façade and the portico are from the 17th-18th centuries. The presbytery and the crypts contain 12th century polychrome mosaics. The interior is in Lombard-Gothic style, with anthropomorphic capitals of the columns. Over the high altar is a 12th-century wooden crucifix by an unknown artist.
- San Giovanni in Canale was founded by the Dominicans in 1220, and enlarged in the mid-16th century.
- San Giuseppe in Ospedale, a Renaissance style parish church.
- Santa Maria in Campagna: Renaissance basilica church facing Piazzale delle Crociate ("Crusades Square"), so called because Pope Urban II summoned the First Crusade here in 1095. The church was built in 1522–1528 to house a miraculous wooden sculpture of the Madonna. Layout was originally in a central Greek-cross plan, but later altered into a Latin cross type. Il Pordenone frescoed the dome and in two chapels on the left side.
- San Sisto: Renaissance church begun in the 15th century atop a temple built in 874 by Empress Angilberga. The choir designed by Gio Pietro Pambianco da Colorno and Bartolomeo da Busseto (1512–1514). In 1513, the monks commissioned Raphael to paint the Sistine Madonna altarpiece; in 1754, the sold this masterpiece to Augustus III of Poland. It is now on display in Dresden.
- Santo Sepolcro: Church of the Holy Sepulchre is by Alessio Tramello.
- Santa Margherita, Piacenza: A now de-consecrated church used for cultural events by Fondazione di Piacenza e Vigevano.

== Cuisine ==
Piacenza and its province are known for the production of seasoned and salted pork products. The main specialities are pancetta (rolled seasoned pork belly, salted and spiced), coppa (seasoned pork neck, containing less fat than pancetta, matured at least for six months), and salame (chopped pork meat flavoured with spices and wine, and made into sausages).

Bortellina (salted pancakes made with flour, salt, and water or milk) and chisulén (torta fritta in Standard Italian; made with flour, milk, and animal fats mixed together and then fried in hot strutto, or clarified pork fat) are considered the perfect coupling of pancetta, coppa, and salame, but they are also considered good with cheeses, particularly Gorgonzola and Robiola.

Pisarei e faśö is a mixture of handmade pasta and borlotti beans. This is served with a sauce made of tomato puree, extra virgin olive oil, onion, salt, and pepper. The dish typically is consumed with grated Parmigiano on top.

Among the culinary specialties of the Piacenza region (although also enjoyed in nearby Cremona) is mostarda di frutta, consisting of preserved fruits in a sugary syrup that is strongly flavored with mustard. Turtlìt (tortelli dolci in standard Italian), or fruit dumplings, are filled with mostarda di frutta, mashed chestnuts, and other ingredients, and they are served at Easter. Turtlìt are popular in the Ferrara area as well. Turtéi, a similarly named Piacentine specialty, is a kind of pasta filled with spinaches and ricotta cheese, or filled with pumpkin. A similar Piacentine dish is the Panzerotti al Forno, which is made with pasta, ricotta cheese, and spinach.

Piacentine staple foods include corn (generally cooked as polenta) and rice (usually cooked as risotto), both of which are very common across northern Italy. Cheeses, such as Grana Padano, are produced in Piacenza although nearby Parma is more famous for its dairy products.

The hills surrounding Piacenza are known for their vineyards. The wine produced in the area is qualified with a denominazione di origine controllata called "Colli Piacentini" ("Hills of Piacenza"). The main wines are Gutturnio (red wines, both sparkling and still), Bonarda (a red wine, often sparkling and foamy, made from Croatina grapes), Ortrugo (a dry white wine), and Malvasia (a sweet white wine).

== Sport ==
Piacenza Calcio 1919 is the main and most supported football team and played in Serie A for eight seasons. They play at the Stadio Leonardo Garilli.

The city's other club, Pro Piacenza 1919, declared bankruptcy in 2019.

Volley Piacenza is the main men's volleyball team and currently plays in serie A1; its palmares entails a championship, a national cup, a national supercup, and two European cups. River Volley is the main women's volleyball team and won the national championship twice.

Rugby is relatively popular compared with Italian standards and Piacenza has a number of rugby teams: Piacenza Rugby Club and Rugby Lyons Piacenza are the most important.

== Notable people ==
- Giulio Alberoni (1664–1752), cardinal and statesman, Bishop of Malaga and Chief Minister to Philip V of Spain from 1715 to 1719 during the War of the Quadruple Alliance
- Edoardo Amaldi (1908–1989), physicist, professor at Sapienza University of Rome (1938–1979), co-founder of CERN, ESA, and INFN
- Casto Innocenzio Ansaldi (1710–1780), professor, theologian, and archaeologist
- Mario Arcelli (1935–2004), economist and once minister for budget of the Italian Government (1996)
- Giorgio Armani (1934–2025), fashion designer, entrepreneur, and founder of Armani
- Mario Biaggi (1917–2015) whose parents came from Piacenza; policeman and a U.S. Congressman
- Ettore Boiardi (1897–1985), also known as Hector Boyardee, Italian-American chef, famous for his eponymous brand of food products, named Chef Boyardee.
- Agostino Casaroli (1914–1998), cardinal and Holy See diplomat, Cardinal Secretary of State (1979–1990)
- Saint Conrad of Piacenza (1290–1351), medieval Franciscan hermit
- Luigi Corbellini (1901–1968), post-impressionist painter and sculptor
- Antonio Cornazzano (c. 1432–1484), poet and humanist, courtier at Milan and Ferrara
- Saint Gerard of Potenza (died 1119), Bishop of Potenza from 1111 until his death
- Federico Ghizzoni (born 1955), CEO of UniCredit
- Melchiorre Gioia (1767–1829), philosopher and political economist
- Pietro Giordani (1774–1848), writer and classical literary scholar
- Giovanni Battista Guadagnini (1711–1786), member of the Guadagnini family of luthiers
- Amedeo Guillet (1909–2010), World War II cavalry commander and diplomat, also known as "Comandante Diavolo"
- Luigi Illica (1857–1919), librettist, author, and co-author (with Giuseppe Giacosa) of opera librettos for Giacomo Puccini (La bohème, Tosca, Madama Butterfly), Alfredo Catalani (La Wally), and Umberto Giordano (Andrea Chénier)
- Giovanni Losi, Combonian missionary (1838–1882), lived his youth here with family
- Giuseppe Merosi (1872–1956), automobile engineer
- Cornelio Musso (1511–1574), Bishop of Bitonto (1544–1574) and prominent at the Council of Trent
- Giuseppe Orsi (born 1945), CEO of Finmeccanica (2011–2013)
- Ferrante Pallavicino (1615–1644), writer of antisocial stories and novels with biblical and profane themes
- Domenico Palmieri (1829–1909), a Jesuit scholastic theologian
- Giovanni Paolo Panini (1691–1765), vedute painter and architect
- Placentinus (died 1192), founder of the Law School of the University of Montpellier
- Amilcare Ponchielli (1834–1886), musician and composer, began his career there in 1861
- Giacomo Radini-Tedeschi (1857–1914), Bishop of Bergamo and mentor of the future Pope John XXIII
- Ilaria Ramelli (born 1973), Italian-born historian
- Reinerius Saccho (1200s – c. 1263), a learned and zealous Italian Dominican
- Alfredo Soressi (1897–1982), painter
- Ettore Gotti Tedeschi (born 1945), economist and banker, former president of the Vatican Bank
- Pietro Marubi (1832–1903), Italian painter, sculptor, architect and photographer
- Teobaldo Visconti (c. 1210–1276), elected Pope Gregory X
- Nina Zilli (born 1980), singer-songwriter who represented Italy in the Eurovision Song Contest 2012
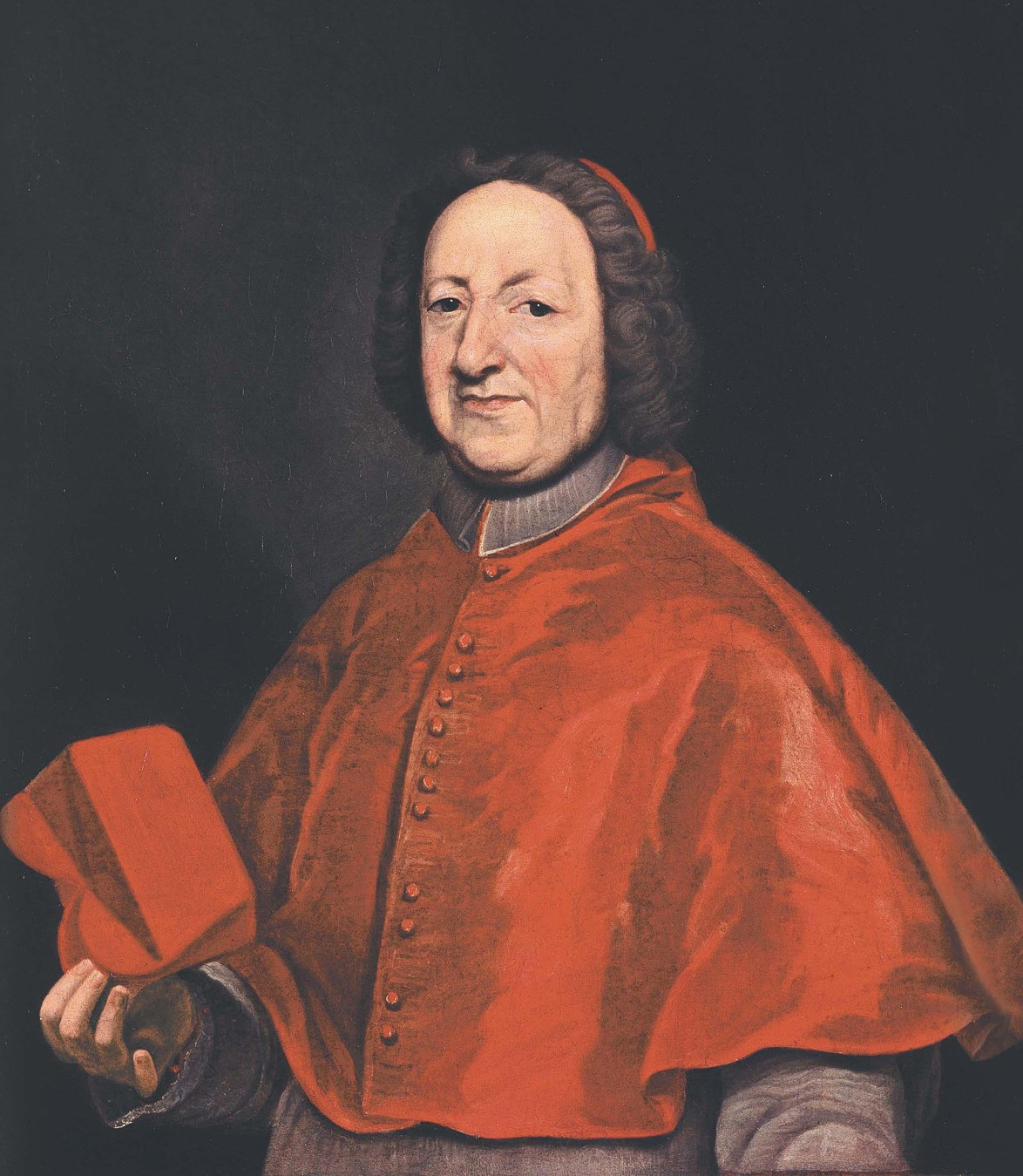
Cardinal Alberoni

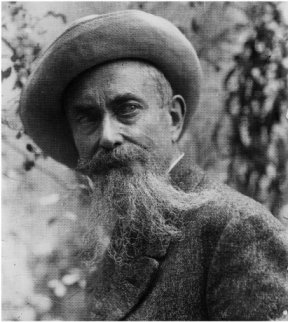
Luigi Illica

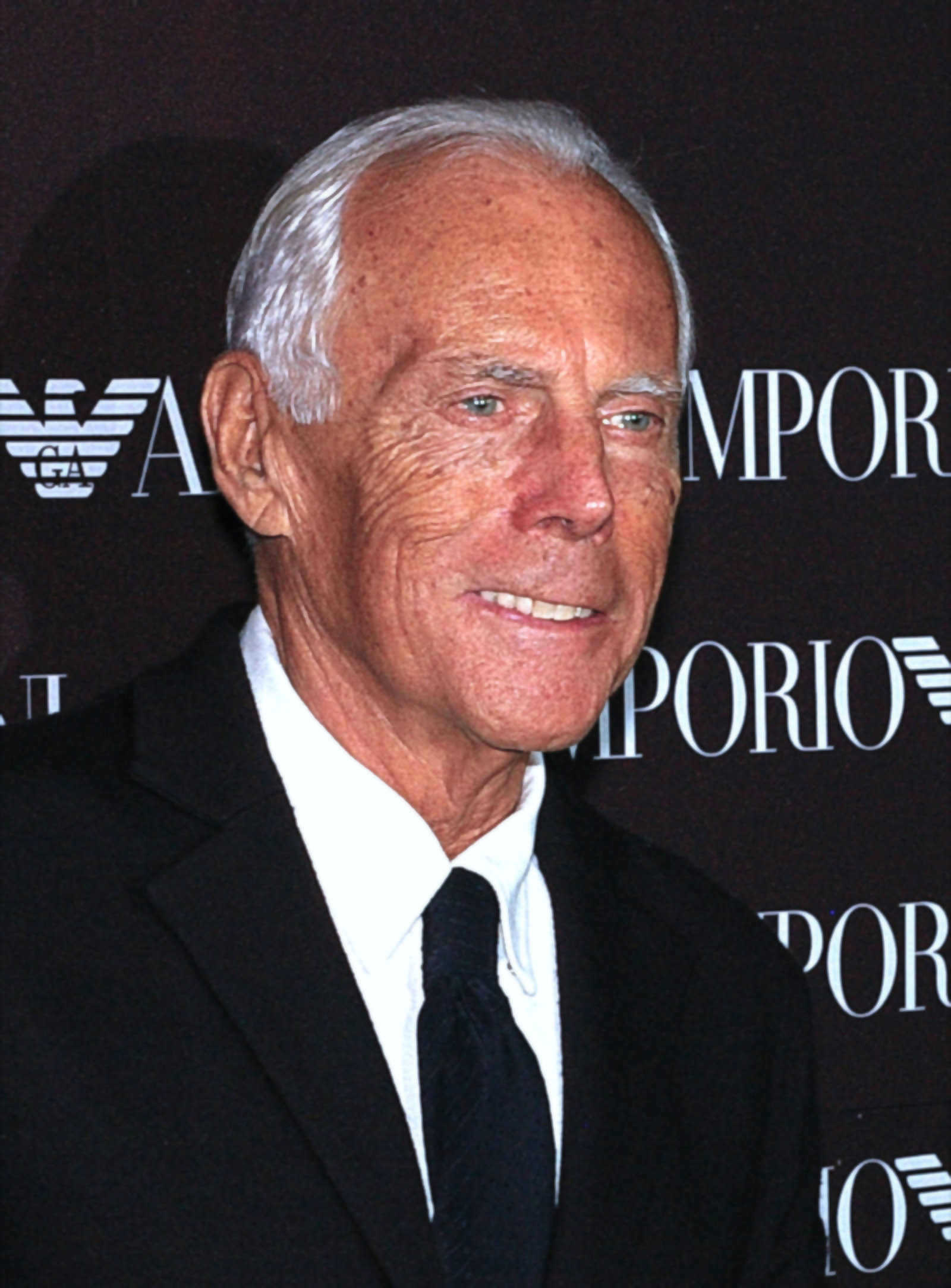
Giorgio Armani

=== In sports ===
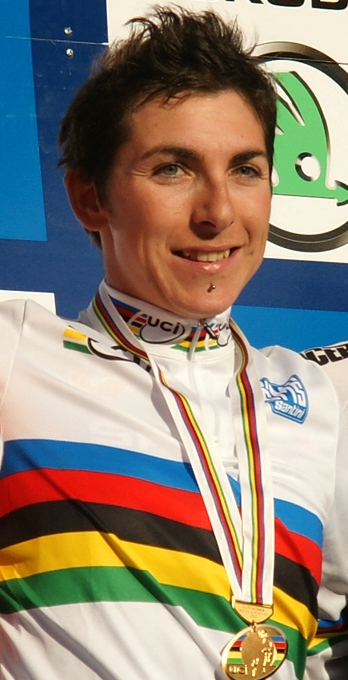
Giorgia Bronzini

- Giorgia Bronzini (born 1983), cyclist, World Champion of women's cycling in 2010 and 2011
- Pino Dordoni (1926–1998), 50 km walk Olympic gold medallist at the 1952 Summer Olympics in Helsinki
- Nicolò Fagioli (born 2001), football player
- Leonardo Fornaroli (born 2004), racing driver
- Filippo "Pippo" Inzaghi (born 1973), World Cup-winning footballer and football coach
- Simone Inzaghi (born 1976), professional footballer
- Tarquinio Provini (1933–2005), twice World Champion Grand Prix motorcycle racer

== International relations ==
=== Twin towns – sister cities ===
Piacenza is twinned with:

- Plasencia, Spain
- Togliatti, Russia
- Erfurt, Germany
- (United States) Placentia, California, U.S.
- Capilla de Guadalupe, Mexico

== See also ==
- Conrad of Piacenza
- Conservatorio Statale di Musica Giuseppe Nicolini
- Piacenza railway station
- Roman Catholic Diocese of Piacenza-Bobbio
