= Francesco Mochi =

Italian sculptor

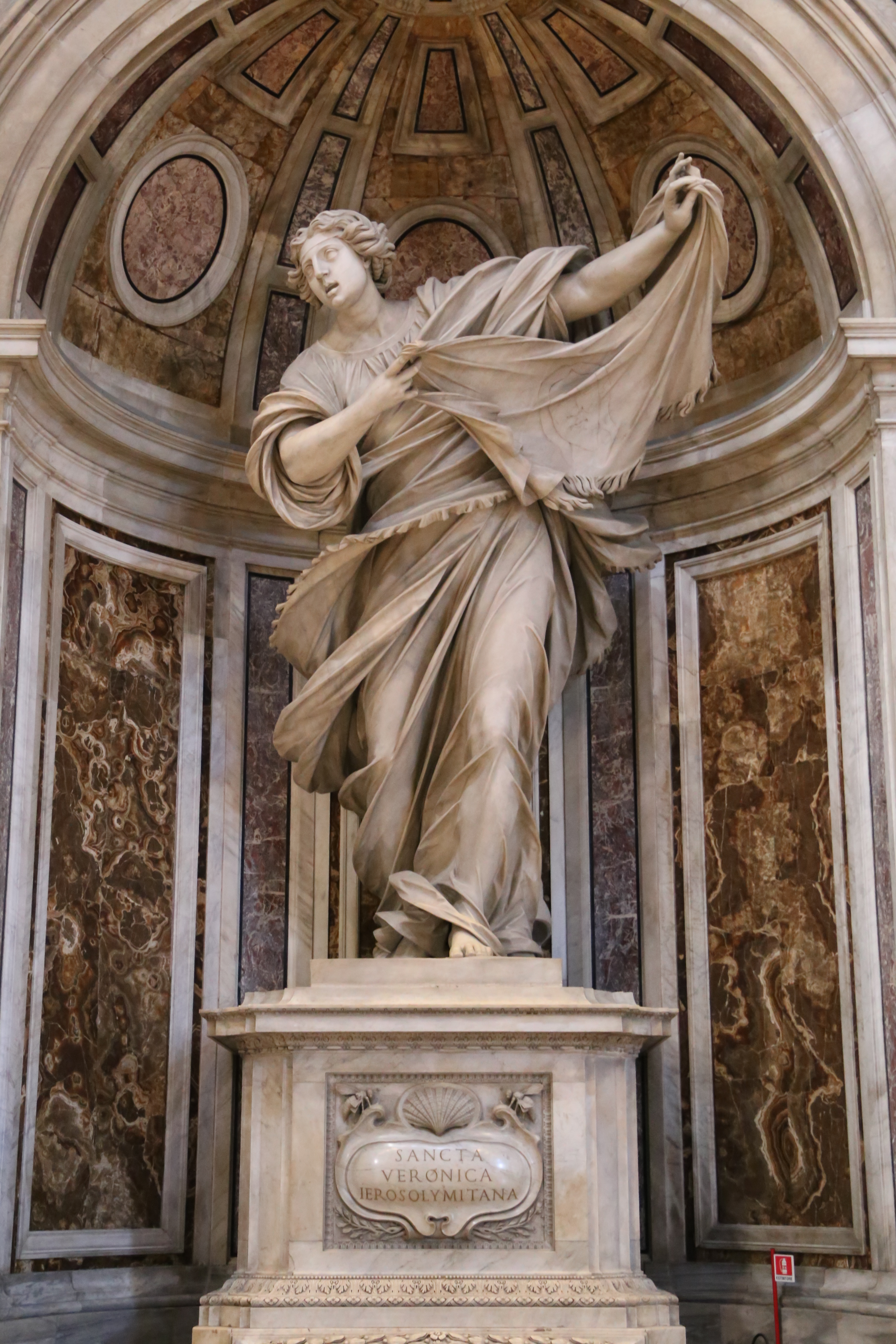
Saint Veronica, Rome, St. Peter's Basilica.

Francesco Mochi (29 July 1580 in Montevarchi – 6 February 1654 in Rome) was an Italian early-Baroque sculptor active mostly in Rome, Piacenza and Orvieto. His dramatic early works in Orvieto are now often regarded as the first truly Baroque sculptures.

== Career ==
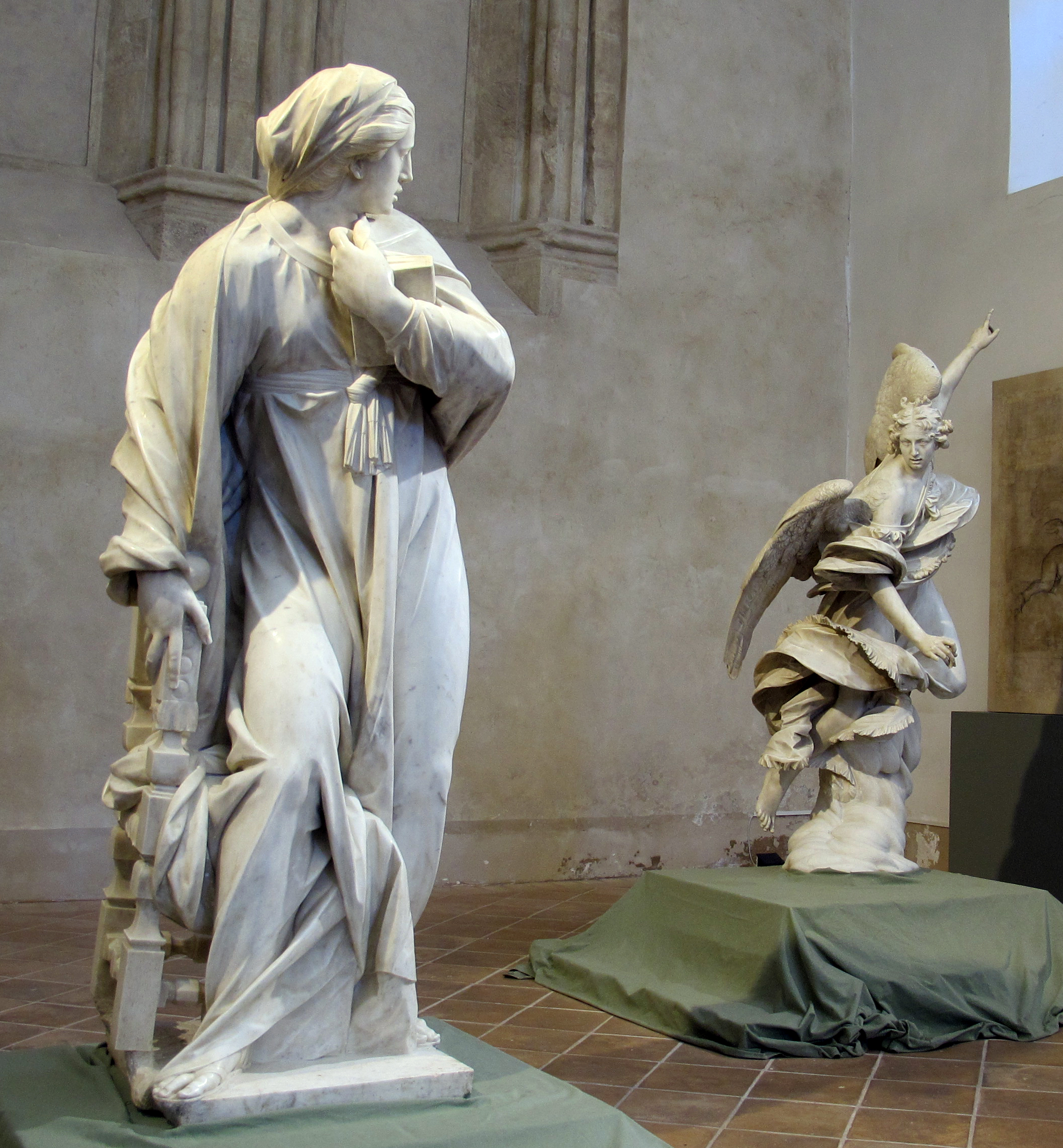
Annunciation, Orvieto.

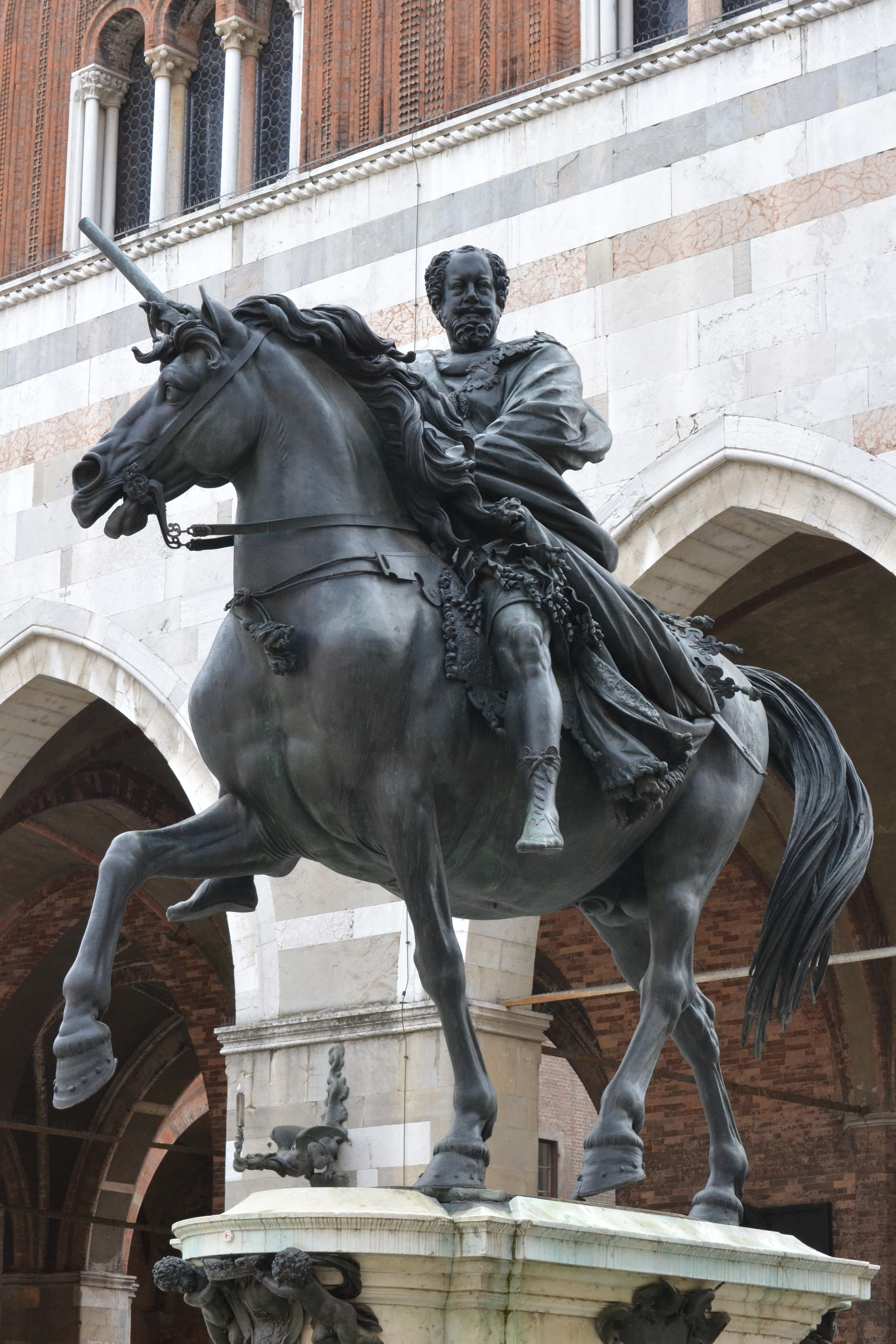
Monument to Ranuccio Farnese.

His early training was with the Florentine painter Santi di Tito, where he formed a taste for pictorial clarity and the primacy of disegno, exemplified in the sculpture of Giambologna and his studio and followers. Although documented as a painter, none of Mochi's paintings appear to survive.

He moved to Rome around 1599 and continued his training in the studio of the Venetian-trained sculptor Camillo Mariani.

Mochi worked with Stefano Maderno on a prominent papal commission, the Cappella Paolina in Santa Maria Maggiore, where he contributed his still somewhat immature Saint Matthew and the Angel, in travertine. His first major work was the Annunciation of the Virgin by the Angel, composed of two statues (the Angel completed 1605, the Virgin Annunciate, 1608, Orvieto, Museo dell'Opera del Duomo). "A fanfare raising sculpture from its slumber", as Rudolf Wittkower called it, it prefigures the baroque with its restrained emotiveness.

Mochi was one of the few seventeenth-century sculptors who was also a master bronze-caster. He made two masterly equestrian bronze statues of Ranuccio and Alessandro Farnese in Piazza Cavalli, Piacenza. Ranuccio Farnese, 1612–20, and Alessandro Farnese, 1620–29, are among the high points of his career.

He returned from Piacenza to Rome where, at long last, he finished his long overdue Saint Martha for the Barberini family chapel at Sant'Andrea della Valle (1609–1621). He now found Gian Lorenzo Bernini fully in charge of major commissions, and a current fully developed Baroque style with which Mochi was now out of touch. His reputation for bitterness and irritation regarding the overshadowing of his career significantly decreased the number of commissions he received.

His late Roman works are the Christ Receiving Baptism (1635 or later, Ponte Milvio, Rome); Taddeus (1641–44, Orvieto), and Saints Peter and Paul (1638–52, Porta del Popolo).

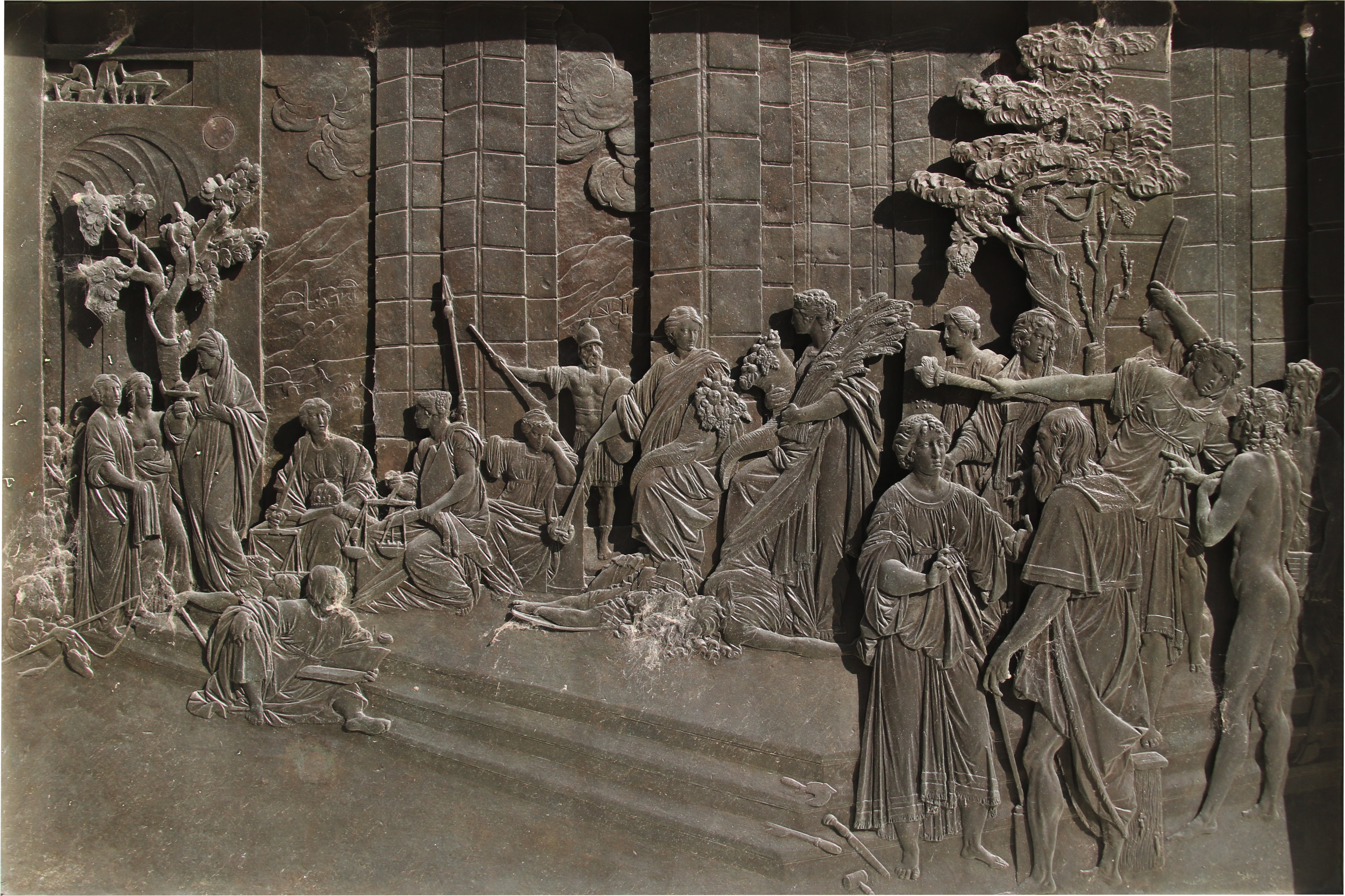
Painterly effects in a bas-relief panel of Mochi's equestrian monument to Ranuccio Farnese (Piacenza).

== Saint Veronica in the Crossing of St Peter's Basilica ==
One of the four massive sculptures in the crossing of St. Peter's Basilica, the statue of the frantic Saint Veronica displaying the by then lost Veil of Veronica (1629–40) is the best-known masterpiece by Mochi, in the most prominent position. The other three are François Duquesnoy's (Saint Andrew), Bernini's (Saint Longinus), and Andrea Bolgi's (St Helena).

Of the four, Mochi's is the least appropriate to its site and topic, the most idiosyncratic and original. Bernini's Longinus is an intermediary between the sober but contorting classicism of Bolgi and Duquesnoy and the emotive dynamism of Mochi. Mochi's passionate depiction appears to overstep the decorum of the place. The other statues exude the equanimity of passionate triumphal Catholicism, celebrated here in the center of the mother church. The frantic pitch of the Veronica seems to attempt to storm into the circle of dramatic setpieces, with a shrill fervor. Mochi, in a letter pleading for completion of his payments, remarked that he had laboured "con ogni studio" in order "to stamp his old age with a memorable work".

Mochi's modern reinterpretation stems in part from interest in him that was renewed by the exhibition Francesco Mochi 1580–1654 in (Montevarchi, Piacenza, Rome) 1981.
