= Museo Civico di Montepulciano =

Museum in Montepulciano, Italy

Coordinates: 43°05′37″N 11°46′51″E

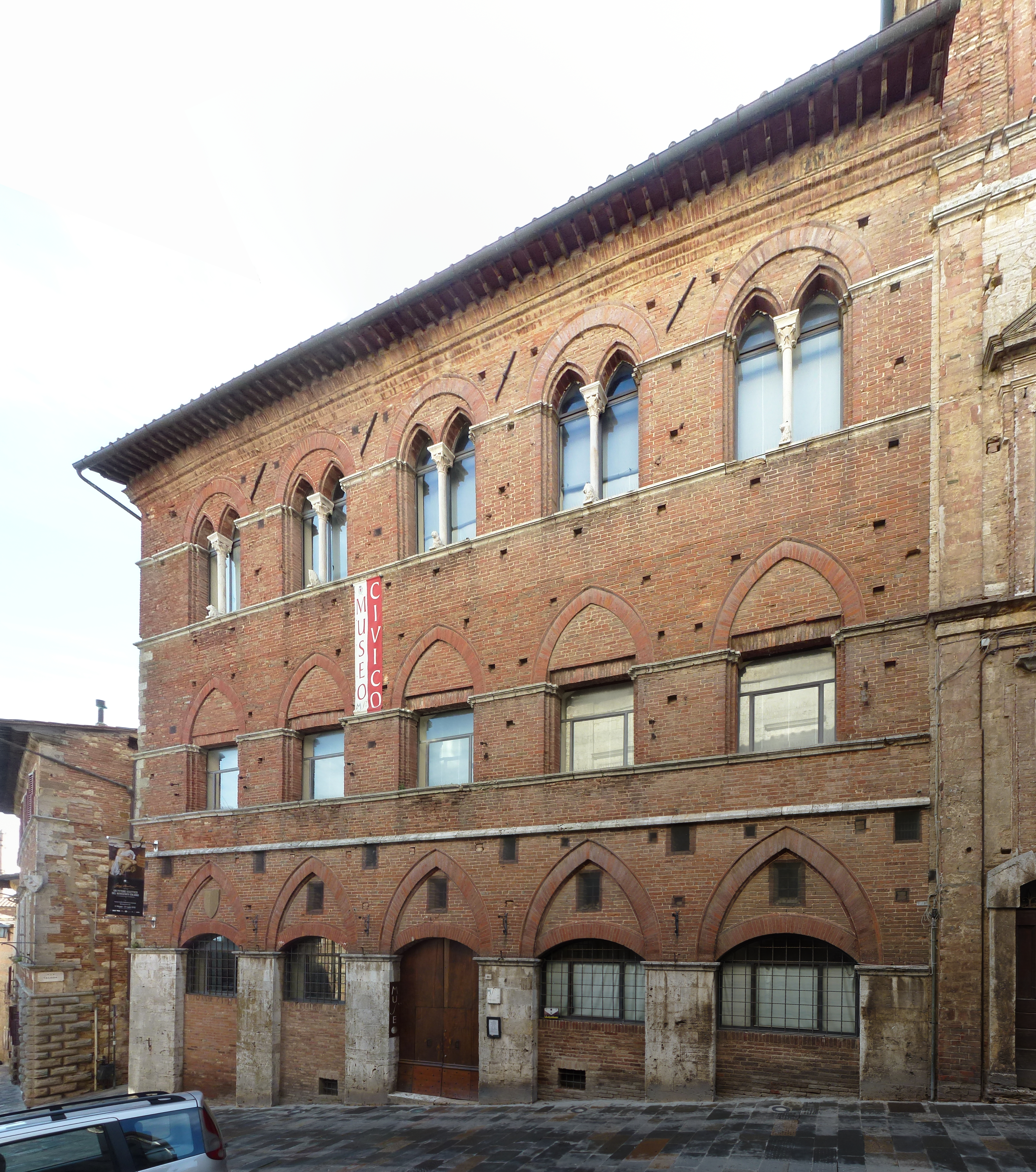
Museo Civico di Montepulciano

The Museo Civico di Montepulciano, also known as the Museo Civico Pinacoteca Crociani, is the town or comune art gallery and museum. It is housed in the medieval Palazzo Neri Orselli, a 14th-century structure located on Via Ricci #10, corner with Via Talosa, in the center of the town of Montepulciano, in the Province of Siena, region of Tuscany, Italy. The museum was founded in 1954.

== History ==
The collection includes archeologic works and lapidary inscriptions from the region. The art gallery originated with a donation to the commune in 1859 of the collection of Francesco Crociani. It was complemented since then by works from various sources including closed ecclesiastical institutions.

Among the masterpieces in the collections is a 13th-century St Francis of Assisi by Margaritone d’Arezzo; a Madonna and Child with two Angels attributed to a 14th-century follower of Duccio da Buoninsegna called the “Master of Badia a Isola”; a Coronation of the Virgin by Jacopo di Mino del Pellicciaio; a Nativity by Benvenuto di Giovanni; a Crucifixion by Filippino Lippi; an Allegory of the Immaculate Conception with Saints by Giovanni Antonio Lappoli; a Holy Family with young St John the Baptist by il Sodoma; an Enthroned Madonna and Child derived from the church of Santa Lucia and painted by Luca Signorelli; a Sant’Agnese Segni with a Model of the City of Montepulciano attributed to Domenico Beccafumi; a Portrait of the Blessed Caterina De' Ricci attributed to Giovanni Battista Naldini; a Children playing with Cat attributed to Abraham Bloemart; and a Portrait of a Nobleman (presumed to be Scipione Caffarelli Borghese) and attributed to Caravaggio.

== Other works in Pinacoteca ==
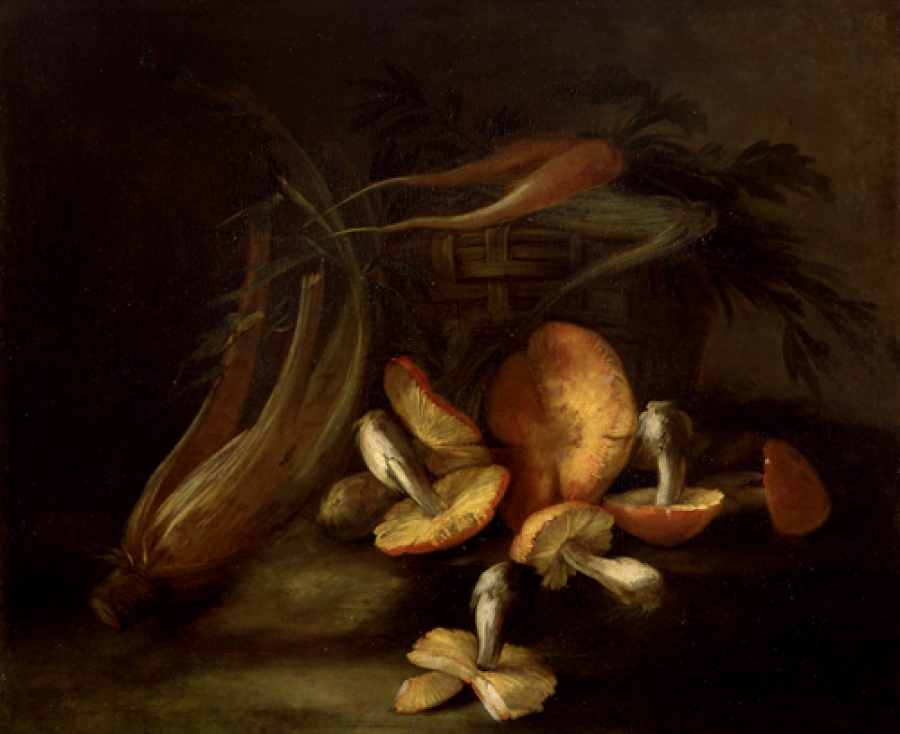
Still life of mushrooms and vegetables by Nicola van Houbraken

- Annunciation to the Shepherds attributed to Livio Mehus
- Triumph of Joseph attributed to Pietro Sorri
- Holy Family and Young St John attributed to Polidoro da Lanciano
- Madonna and Child, Angel with fruit basket attributed to Sebastiano Bastianino
- Girl with cymbal attributed to Antonio Amorosi
- Portraits attributed to Antonio Franchi, Carlo Maratta, Alessandro Allori, and Tiberio Titi
- Portrait of Violante di Baviera by Bartolomeo Mancini
- Portrait of Maria Maddalena Baroni de' Siri by Benjamin von Block
- Mystical Marriage of St Catherine with St Francis, John the Baptist, St Bernard by Bicci di Lorenzo
- Portrait of Eleonora Garcia Toledo by studio of Francesco Brina
- Parable of the Rich Man by studio of Francesco Bassano the Younger (the biblical Rich man and Lazarus)
- Portrait of a Knight of Malta by studio of Franz Pourbus the Younger
- Portrait of Gentleman by studio of Giusto Suttermans
- Adoration by Shepherds by studio of Hans von Aachen
- Moses as a child before Pharaoh by studio of Pier Dandini
- Madonna and Child by studio of Raffaellino del Garbo
- Portrait of Primicerio Francesco Crociani by Candido Sorbini and studio
- Kitchen Interior by Carlo Antonio Crespi
- Portici sul mare by follower of Agostino Tassi
- Landscape with Vocation of Peter by follower of Filippo Napoletano
- St Francis of Assisi by a follower of Francesco Traini
- Madonna and Child (da Raffaello) by studio of Lorenzo Costa
- Madonna of the Humility, John the Baptist, St Blaise and Holy King attributed to Cristoforo di Bindoccio
- Still life with musical instruments (1712) by Cristoforo Munari
- Allegory by Gioacchino Crovatto
- Two Landscapes with shepherdesses by Ernest Daret
- Ex-voto for Miracle the Lightning bolt of August 28, 1671 at Salone del palazzo Comunale, anonymous
- Gesù Bambino dormiente con la croce attributed to Marcantonio Franceschini
- St Catherine of Alexandria by Francesco Curradi
- Sophonisba by Francesco Botti
- Portrait of Francesco Carletti by François Xavier Fabre
- Portrait of Luigi Chiarini (abbot) by Tebaldo Fumi
- Portrait of Count Giovanni Angelo Bastogi by G. Comandoli
- Venus and Amore by Antonio Domenico Gabbiani
- Holy Family and Young St John the Baptist attributed to Giacinto Gimignani
- Santa Maria Maddalena penitente by Giovanni Antonio Galli lo Spadarino
- Baptism by Giovanni Balducci
- Fortress of Montepulciano by Italiano Zecchi
- Serenade with dancers and musicians by Jan Miel
- Landscape with fiume e figure by Jan Frans van Bloemen (Orizzonte)
- Crucifixion by Luca di Tommé
- Landscape with Roman Ruins by follower of Gaspar Dughet
- Portrait of Nicola Cerbara by Torquato Mazzoni
- Still-life of mushrooms and vegetables by Nicola van Houbraken
- St Clare by Nicolò Betti
- St Jerome in Desert by Palma il Giovane
