= Finocchio (disambiguation) =

Finocchio refers to Florence fennel. Finocchio can also be a negative term for homosexual in Italian.

== Other ==
Finocchio may also refer to:

- Finocchio (Rome Metro), a station of Line C of the Rome Metro
- Finocchio's Club, a former nightclub and bar in San Francisco

== See also ==
- Finocchiaro
- Finocchiona
- Finocchito
