= Finocchiaro =

Finocchiaro (pronounced [finokˈkjaːro]; meaning "producer or seller of fennel") is an Italian surname. Notable people with the surname include:

- Alejandro Finocchiaro (born 1967), Argentine politician
- Andrea Finocchiaro Aprile (1878–1964), Italian politician
- Angela Finocchiaro (born 1955), Italian actress
- Anna Finocchiaro (born 1955), Italian politician
- Camillo Finocchiaro Aprile (1851–1916), Italian jurist and politician
- Donatella Finocchiaro (born 1970), Italian actress
- Fabio Finocchiaro (born 1939), Italian chess player
- Francesco Paolo Finocchiaro (1868–1947), Sicilian painter
- Giusella Finocchiaro (born 1964), Italian lawyer
- Lia Finocchiaro (born 1984), Australian politician
- Maurice Finocchiaro (born 1942), American philosopher
- Tim Finocchiaro (born 1979), Australian rules footballer
- Vincenzo Finocchiaro (1953–2019), Italian swimmer

== See also ==
- Mickey Carroll (born Michael Finocchiaro; 1919–2009), American actor
