= Palazzo Costa =

The Palazzo Costa is a Baroque style palace located on Via Roma #80 in Piacenza, Region of Emilia Romagna, Italy. The Museo Ambientale displaying period art and artifacts is now hosted by part of the palace.

== History ==
The palace was commissioned by the wealthy merchant and banking Costa family from Genoa. The architecture and the fresco decoration were designed in 1693 by Ferdinando Bibiena. Bibiena designed the palace's dramatic entry staircase, leading to a piano nobile which Bibiena painted quadratura and Giovanni Evangelista Draghi frescoed the Marriage of Bacchus and Ariadne (1699).

The palace now hosts the Museo Ambientale and collects artworks, furniture, and artifacts of mainly the 17th and 18th-century, including works by Salvator Rosa. His Gaius Marius before the ruins of Carthage is on display. The museum also has paintings by Mario Nuzzi also known as Mario dei Fiori (floral still-lives); Sisto Badalocchio; Francesco Furini (Magdalen); Francesco Botti; Giovanni Giacomo Barbelli; Giovanni Maria delle Piane known as Il Mulinaretto, (Portrait of Philip V, King of Spain); School of Pannini (Vedute); Van Coomans (Baptism); Giacinto Gimignani (Alexander the Great accepts Surrender of Enemy King); Baciccio, (Magdalen); and Andrea Sacchi (St Romuald in Prayer).

In 1880, after the death of Count Giacomo Costa, the palace was inherited by his adopted son, Pietro Ceresa; he sold it to the Raguzzi, and in 1934, it was sold at auction to the Maggi family, who still owns a large part of the palace. However some of the main rooms in the piano nobile are maintained as a small museum property by the Fondazione Horak.

The facade has a central balcony and tympanum; the latter has a coat of arms of the Costa Family. The work has a sobriety that hints of Neoclassicism. The grand staircase entry has the statues of Aphrodite, Juno, Flora and Pomona in the niches.

Other rooms have elaborate stucco and fresco decoration, as well as Rococo furnishings and artifacts, often gilded.
