= Luca Antonio Pagnini =

Italian writer, scholar and translator

Reverend Luca Antonio Pagnini
- Born: January 15, 1737; Pistoia, Grand Duchy of Tuscany
- Died: 21 March 1814 (aged 77); Pisa, Grand Duchy of Tuscany
- Burial place: Santi Jacopo e Filippo, Pisa
- Other name: Eritisco Pilenejo
- Occupations: Catholic priest, translator, university teacher, hellenist, latinist
- Parent(s): Francesco Pagnini and Maria Angiola Pagnini (née Grassi)

Academic background
- Education: University of Parma; University of Pisa

Academic work
- Discipline: Greek scholar, Classicist
- Institutions: University of Pisa
- Notable students: Luigi Chiarini

Luca Antonio Pagnini (15 January 1737 – 21 March 1814) was an Italian writer and a scholar and translator of Greco-Roman literature.

== Biography ==
Luca Antonio Pagnini was born in Pistoia to a poor family. His abilities and the good training he received from Cesare Franchini attracted attention to him, and the Carmelites invited him to join their chapter in Florence. On entering the Carmelite Order he changed his name to Giuseppe Maria. Later he was sent to Parma, where he taught philosophy in the college of his Order. The writer Frugoni took note of the young man and obtained for him an appointment as teacher in the University of Parma. He soon was teaching rhetoric and Greek language. He became noted as a prolific translator of classic poetry and writings. He also published arcadian poetry under the pseudonym of Eritisco Pilenejo. He was forced to leave Parma after the death of Duke Ferdinand, and move to Pisa, where he was named as professor of Greek, and afterwards of Latin literature. He became a corresponding member of the Accademia della Crusca.

His translations are his chief claim to remembrance, especially his Horace (1814). Among Pagnini's translations is a version of the Greek bucolic poets: Poesie Bucoliche Italiane, Latine, e Greche, Parma, 1780.

== Bibliography ==
- Hutton, James (1935). The Greek Anthology in Italy to the Year 1800. Cornell University Press. pp. 430–431.
- Arcangeli, Giuseppe (1840). "Luca Antonio Pagnini". In Emilio Amedeo De Tipaldo (ed.). Biografia degli Italiani illustri nelle scienze, lettere ed arti del secolo XVIII, e de' contemporanei. Vol. 7. Venice: dalla tipografia di Alvisopoli. pp. 176–180.
- "Pagnini, Luca Antonio". Treccani (in Italian).
- "Pagnini, Luca Antònio". Sapere.it (in Italian). De Agostini.
