= Houbraken =

Houbraken is a Dutch-language surname. People with this surname include:

- Antonina Houbraken (1686–1736), Dutch artist, daughter of Arnold Houbraken
- Arnold Houbraken (1660–1719), Dutch biographer of artists, and engraver
- Jacobus Houbraken (1698–1780), Dutch engraver, son of Arnold Houbraken
- Joannes van Houbraken (c. 1600–after 1661), Flemish painter and art dealer
