= Albert Kazimirski de Biberstein =

Polish orientalist and author

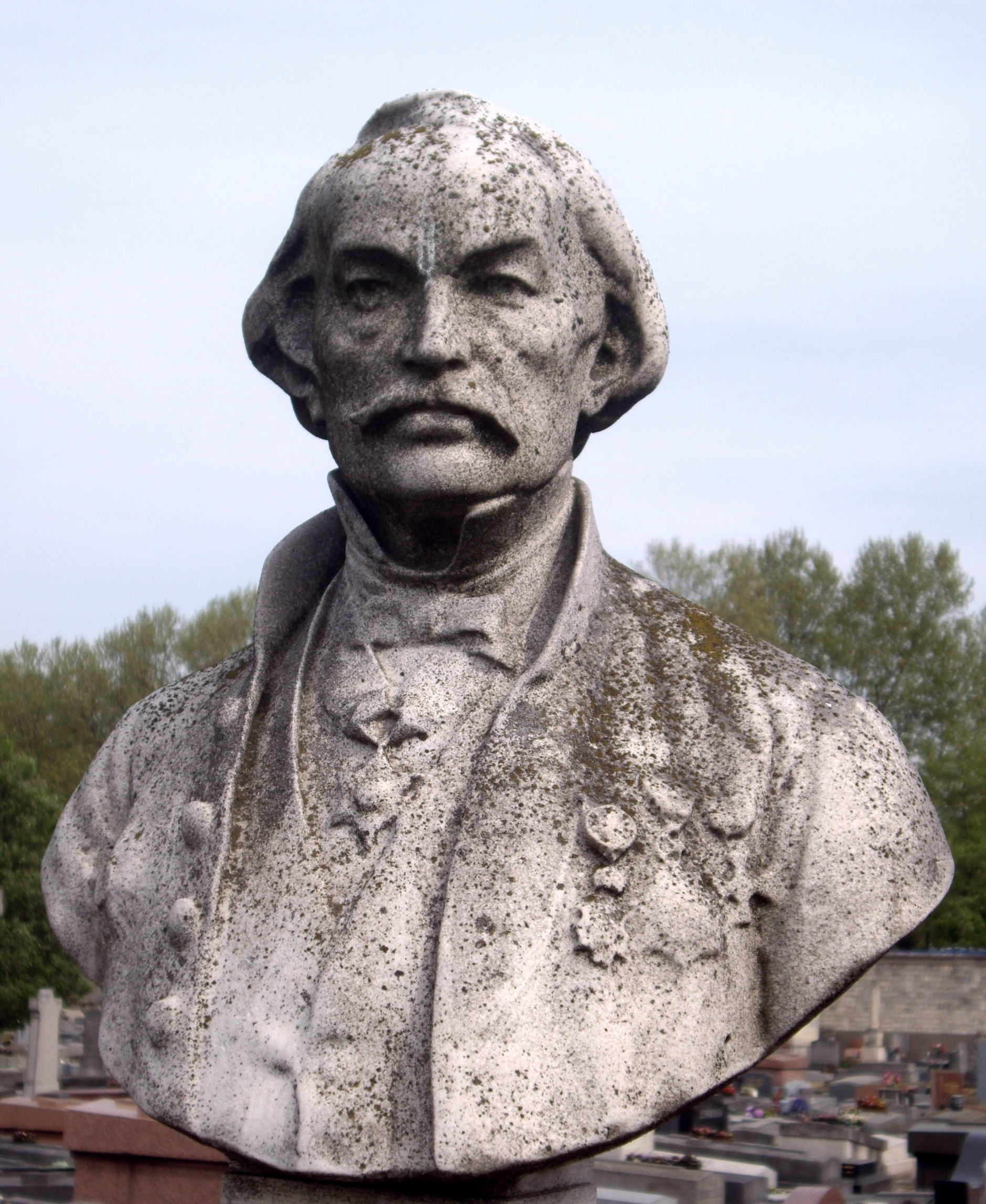
- Bust of Kazimirski Biberstein at Montrouge Cemetery
- Born: Albert Félix Ignace Kazimirski; 20 November 1808; Korchów near Lublin
- Died: 22 June 1887 (aged 78); Paris
- Occupations: Orientalist; Translator

Academic background
- Education: University of Warsaw; University of Berlin
- Doctoral advisor: Luigi Chiarini

Academic work
- Discipline: Arabist, Ancient Near Eastern Linguist
- Sub-discipline: Quran specialist

Albert Félix Ignace Kazimirski or Albin de Biberstein (20 November 1808 – 22 June 1887) was a Polish orientalist, author of an Arabic-French dictionary and a number of Arab-French translations, including the Quran.

== Biography ==
He learned oriental languages at the University of Warsaw and later University of Berlin.

He took part in the 1830 November Uprising of the kingdom of Poland against the Czar of Russia and the King of Poland Nicholas I of Russia. Like many other Poles, after the defeat of the Polish army in September 1831, he chose to go into exile in France, where he traveled with the historian Joachim Lelewel.

In 1834, alongside Adam Mickiewicz and Bohdan Zaleski, he founded the Slavic Society (Towarszystwo słowiańskie) of Paris. He also wrote a Polish-French dictionary.

Then he became a dragoman, providing interpretation of languages for the representatives of France to the Levantine échelles, and was attached to the mission of Persia.

He contributed to the revision of the second translation of the Quran into French based on the 1783 works of Claude-Étienne Savary. He eventually created his own translation drawing on the earlier works of the Italian cleric Louis Maracci (1698) and the English George Sale (1734) and later published for the first time in 1840.

Albert Kazimirski de Biberstein is buried at Montrouge Cemetery.

== Works ==
- 1840 (or 1852): Le Koran, traduction nouvelle faite sur le texte arabe / par M. Kasimirski, interprète de la légation française en Perseage 1841, 1844, Paris, Charpentier, 511 p., 1970, Garnier Flammarion, with a preface by Mohammed Arkoun, and 1997, Jean de Bonnot
- 1860: Dictionnaire arabe-français, contenant toutes les racines de la langue arabe, leurs dérivés, tant dans l'idiome vulgaire que dans l'idiome littéral, ainsi que les dialectes d'Alger et de Maroc, Paris, Maisonneuve et Cie, 2 volumes, 1392 and 2369 pages. (reprinted in 1944, Beyrouth, éditions du Liban, and 2005, édition Albouraq)
- 1886: Manoutchehri: Poète persan du 11^{ème} siècle de notre ère (du 5^{ième} de l'hégire): Texte, traduction, notes, et introduction historique. Paris. Klincksieck. (Another copy, dated 1887).
- Dialogues français-persans : précédés d'un précis de la grammaire persane et suivis d'un vocabulaire français-persan.
- Enis el-Djelis ou Histoire de la belle Persane. Conte des Mille et une nuits, traduit de l'arabe et accompagné de notes par Albert de Biberstein Kazimirski.

== Bibliography ==
- Kazimirski (Albert-Félix-Ignace de Biberstein), in Grand dictionnaire universel du XIX^{e} siècle, tome 17.
