= Luigi Chiarini (abbot) =

Italian abbot, orientalist and translator

Reverend Luigi Chiarini
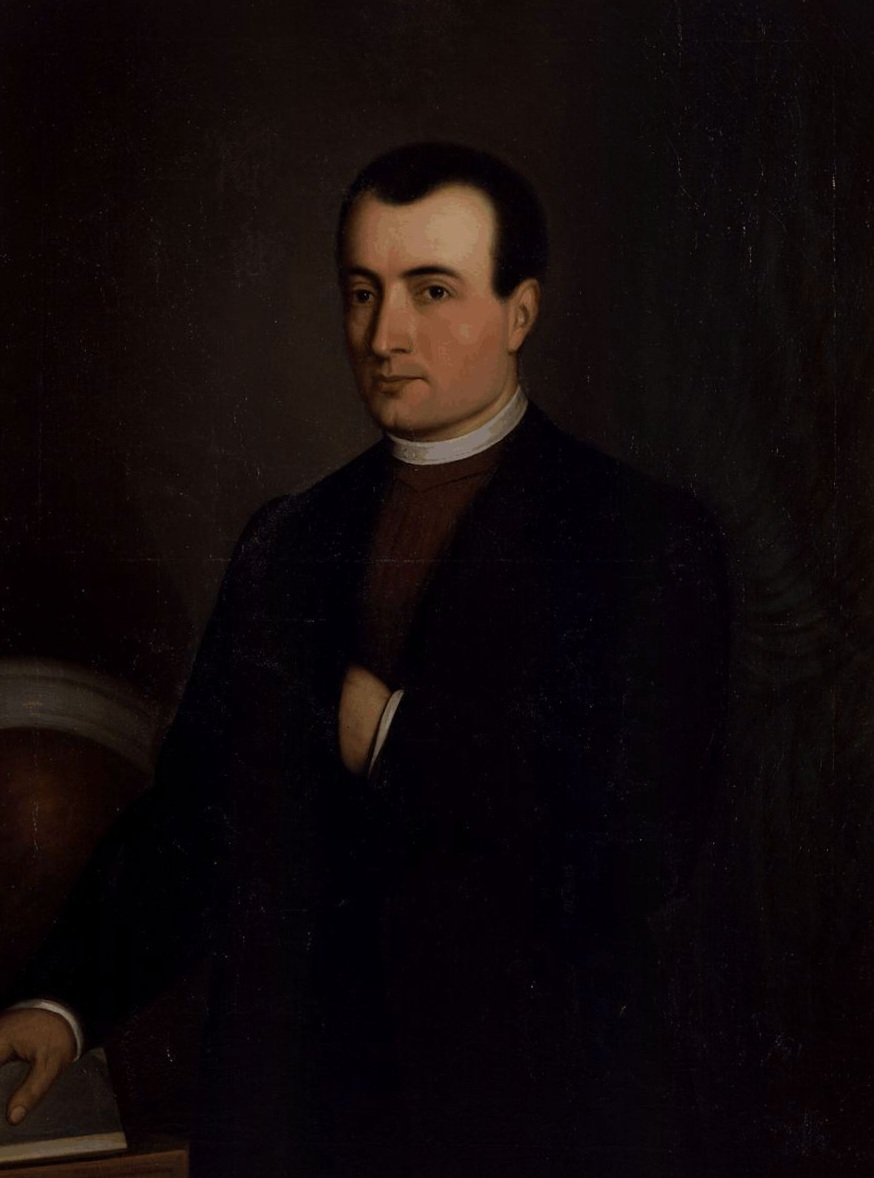
- Portrait of Luigi Chiarini by Teobaldo Fumi, Museo Civico di Montepulciano
- Born: April 26, 1789; Acquaviva, Grand Duchy of Tuscany
- Died: 3 March 1832 (aged 42); Warsaw, Russian Empire
- Occupations: Catholic priest, translator, university teacher, orientalist
- Known for: First translation of the Talmud in French
- Title: abbot
- Board member of: Jewish Committee (Komitet Starozakonnych)
- Parent(s): Antonio Chiarini and Stella Chiarini (née Casagli)

Academic background
- Education: University of Pisa
- Doctoral advisor: Luca Antonio Pagnini
- Influences: Cesare Malanima; Wilhelm Gesenius

Academic work
- Discipline: Hebrew scholar, Ancient Near Eastern Linguist
- Sub-discipline: Talmud specialist
- Institutions: Scuola Normale Superiore di Pisa; University of Warsaw
- Doctoral students: Albert Kazimirski de Biberstein
- Influenced: Henry Hart Milman; Alexander McCaul; Louis Veuillot

Luigi Chiarini was an Italian abbot, orientalist and translator, born near Montepulciano (Italy), April 26, 1789, died February 28, 1832, in Warsaw (Poland), known for the first translation of the Talmud (Talmud of Babylon and Talmud of Jerusalem) in French. His translation of the Talmud benefited from a grant from Tsar Nicholas I (Emperor of Russia).

== Biography ==
Luigi Chiarini was born at Valiano in the province of Montepulciano in the region of Tuscany, on 26 April 1789 to a Catholic family. His father Antonio was a carpenter, and his mother Stella was a smith's daughter. Luigi was educated at the Bishops' Seminary at Montepulciano. He specialised in philosophy and theology as well as in belles-lettres. He also mastered several languages, including French and Hebrew. Then he was sent to Pisa, where he studied the languages of the Near East, theology and belles-lettres for five years. He obtained his doctorate from the University of Pisa on 19 August 1811. He became assistant to the Reverend Sebastiano Ciampi, professor of Latin and Greek, at the Normal College in Pisa. At that time, Luigi Chiarini published his own poems and his translations from Hebrew, Greek and Latin, which he recited at the Pisa Literary Society. In recognition of his scientific achievements he was appointed member of the Italian Academy on 30 May 1818. Because of the turmoil of the revolution he left Pisa and went back to his native town, where he became chancellor of the Royal High School and professor of Italian and Latin. Soon, however, he left for Warsaw, where he was invited by Sebastiano Ciampi, who was already professor of the University of Warsaw at that time. In 1826 he was appointed professor of Oriental Languages and Antiquities at the Royal University of Warsaw with Stanisław Kostka Potocki's backing. He offered lectures on the Introduction to the Old Testament, archaeology, Hebrew language and ancient Hebrew materials. Among Chiarini's disciples mention should be made of the famed orientalist Albert Kazimirski de Biberstein.

Chiarini was a prominent member of the so-called "Jewish Committee," organized by imperial decree May 22, 1825. This committee established schools for Jewish boys and girls as well as classes of Hebrew for Christian young men to study Jewish history, rabbinic literature, and even yiddish, which would enable them to do missionary work among the Jews of Poland. Chiarini was entrusted by this body to translate the Babylonian Talmud, for which the Russian government granted him a subsidy of 12,000 thalers. He published his work, "Théorie du judaïsme appliquée à la réforme des Israélites de tous les pays de l'Europe, et servant en même temps d'ouvrage préparatoire à la version du Talmud de Babylone," 2 vols., Paris, 1830, as a precursor to the prescribed version of the Talmud which was to appear in six large folio volumes. Chiarini's book planned the reform of the Polish Jews, and also the general improvement of the condition of all Jews. This work is divided into three parts; in the first Chiarini states the difficulties of knowing the true character of Judaism; in the second he elucidates the theory of Judaism; and in the third the author treats of the reform of Judaism and discusses the means of removing what he considers its "pernicious" elements. In brief, Chiarini endeavors to prove that the purported evils of Judaism originate chiefly from the alleged harmful antisocial teachings of the Talmud. He argues that the state should assist the Jews in freeing themselves from the influence of the Talmud, and that they should return to the simple Mosaic faith. This goal can be attained in two ways: first, by the establishment of schools where Bible instruction is given and the Hebrew grammar studied; and, secondly, by a French translation of the Babylonian Talmud, with explanatory notes and refutations. The fact that it was to be translated into French rather than German or Polish was a function of the importance of the French language in Europe in the nineteenth century, a period when it had reached its apogee as the language of cultured circles.

Chiarini recognized that the popular knowledge of the Jews and Judaism was inadequate and defective, and that their enemies furnish nothing but distorted instead of correct information. Nevertheless, his work is pervaded with some of the traditional prejudices against which he protests; but, at the same time, he expresses a sincere concern for the spiritual and material welfare of the Jews, and a desire to improve their condition. His programme of enlightenment and reform was in some respects akin to that of the Jewish educated classes.

Of Chiarini's translation of the Talmud only two volumes appeared, under the title "Le Talmud de Babylone, Traduit en Langue Française et Complété par Celui de Jérusalem et par d'Autres Monuments de l'Antiquité Judaïque," Leipzig, 1831. Volume One comprises introductory issues, such as the reason for the emergence of the Talmud (Mishnah and Gemara), written and oral law, rabbinic tradition, differences between written and oral law, authors and editors of the Talmud, the Mishnaic style, commentaries to the Mishnah, Mekhilta, Sifra, Sifre, Tosefta, Baraita and Genesis Rabbah, the Jerusalem Gemara, its authors and style, the Palestinian Talmud and the plan of its subdivision, Venetian edition, Cracow edition, the Babylonian Talmud, Halakha, Aggadah, groupings within Judaism, Tannaim, Amoraim and the Hebrew calendar. The end of the first volume and the entire second volume comprise the translation of Berakhot, including both Mishnah and Gemara, that is to say, both the text and the ancient comment. According to Herman Hedwig Bernard Chiarini's translation shows a most profound and accurate knowledge of rabbinic literature.

Chiarini's translation project was partly the catalyst for Ephraim Moses Pinner's proposed German translation of the Talmud (of which, like Chiarini's, only the first tractate, Berakhot, ever appeared). Chiarini's "Théorie du Judaïsme" was widely criticized and caused considerable discussion in the "Revue Encyclopédique" and in separate pamphlets by Leopold Zunz, Isaak Markus Jost, and others. Besides many other works on Italian poetry (Pisa, 1816 and 1818) and on the history of astronomy in the Orient, Chiarini wrote a Hebrew grammar and a Hebrew dictionary, both in Latin, translated into Polish by the Wilno Hebrew specialist Piotr Chlebowski, Warsaw, 1826 and 1829; he wrote also "Dei Funerali degli Ebrei Polacchi" ("Concerning the Funerals of the Polish Jews," Bologna, 1826).

Chiarini was compelled to give up his project of translating the Talmud because of the November Uprising. He died in Warsaw on 28 February 1832. His portrait by Teobaldo Fumi can be found in the Museo Civico di Montepulciano.

At the Tsar's request his library was acquired by the Warsaw municipality, and an agreement was drawn up, providing for Stanislaus Hoga to use the library and to translate the Talmud into Polish on the same terms as had been agreed with Chiarini.

== Criticism ==
Chiarini's projects met with sharp criticism. The French scholar August Arthur Beugnot wrote in "Revue Encyclopedique" (6: 1828 vol. 38) that treating the translation of the Talmud as a means to the reform of the Jews was an abortive idea. All in all, the reform of Judaism should be carried on by the Jews themselves and not by the aliens.

Abraham Stern made a critical assessment of the Hebrew Dictionary published by Chiarini, and the latter replied that it was not the Dictionary that he meant but his translation of the Talmud. "When Stern criticises the Dictionary, he wants to prove that my knowledge of Hebrew is insufficient and, consequently, that I do not understand the Talmud."

In France Chiarini's "Théorie du Judaïsme" gained several favourable reviews and a couple of very critical reviews. In 1830 two reviews by the German Jews were published, namely by Jost and by Zunz, and by the Warsaw erudite Jakub Tugenhold, who charged Chairini with a complete unacquaintance with the rabbinic literature. German scholars suggested that he had not used source material. At the same time, a very favourable review by J. Elkana was published which praised the theory of the reform of Judaism presented by Chiarini.

== Works ==
- "Considerazioni del canonico Luigi Chiarini professore di storia ecclesiastica e di lingue orientali nella R. Università di Varsavia e presidente della censura ebraica nel Regno di Polonia intorno al libro intitolato La Fionda di David o sia l'antichità ed autorità dei Punti Vocali nel Testo Ebreo dimostrata e difesa per il Dott. Rosellini Toscano". Nuova Collezione d'opuscoli letterarii. IV: 183–202. 1824.
- Chiarini, Luigi (1826). Grammatyka hebrayska (in Polish). Warsaw.
- Chiarini, Luigi (1829). Słownik Hebrayski (in Polish). Warsaw.
- Fragment d'astronomie chaldéenne découvert dans le prophète Ezéchiel et éclairci par l'abbé C. Chiarini. Leipzig: J. A. G. Weigel. 1831.
  - "Chaldean Astronomy Discovered in Ezekiel," Asiatic Journal and Monthly Register for British and Foreign India, China, and Australasia, v. 4 — New Series, Jan. – April 1831. London: Parbury, Allen, & Co., 1831.
- Observations sur un article de la "Revue encyclopédique", dans lequel on examine le projet de traduire le Talmud de Babylone... / par l'abbé L. Chiarini... / Paris : impr. de F. Didot, 1829.
- Théorie du Judaïsme, appliquée à la réforme des Israélites de tous les pays de l'Europe, et servant en même temps d'ouvrage préparatoire à la version du Thalmud de Babylone / par l'Abbé L. A. Chiarini / Paris : J. Barbezat, 1830.
- Le Thalmud de Babylone, traduit en langue française et completé par celui de Jérusalem et par d'autres monuments de l'antiquité judaïque (in French). Vol. 1. Leipzig. 1831.
- Le Thalmud de Babylone, traduit en langue française et completé par celui de Jérusalem et par d'autres monuments de l'antiquité judaïque (in French). Vol. 2. Leipzig. 1831.
