= Joannes van Houbraken =

Flemish painter and art dealer

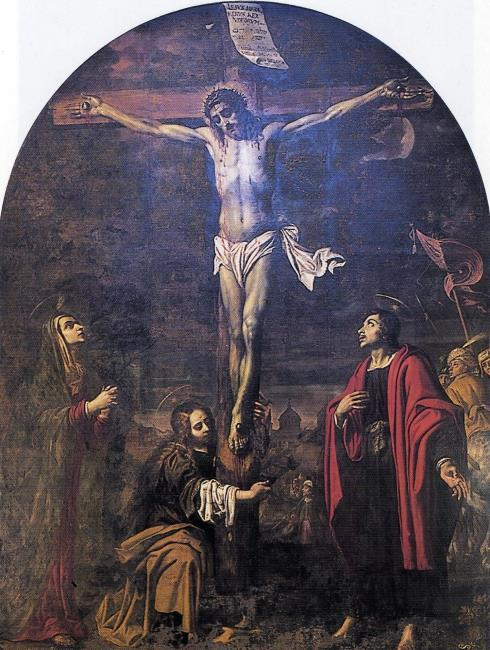
Crucifixion with May, John and Mary Magdalene in Santa Maria Assunta, Randazzo, Sicily

Joannes, Jan or Giovanni van Houbraken, van Houbracken or Houbraken (c. 1600 – ) was a Flemish painter and art dealer. He painted religious compositions and allegorical genre scenes. He lived and worked for a while in Italy, first in Rome, later in Naples and finally in Messina. He became familiar with the work of the Caravaggisti, whose style influenced him. After his return to Antwerp he engaged in trade with Italy and sent his works and other items produced by Antwerp craftsmen to patrons in Italy.

== Life ==
Details about Joannes's life are sketchy. In the past he was erroneously identified with the Giovanni Battista Vanderbrachen or Jan-Baptist van den Broeck, a silk merchant and consul, who became a member of the Oratorio della Compagnia dei Mercanti in Messina in 1647 and who died in 1665 in Messina where he was buried at the Oratorium of the order of the San Franscesco dei Mercanti. He was likely also not identical with the tapestry designer with the same name who became a master in the Antwerp Guild of Saint Luke in 1640. The works of the two artists show too many stylistic differences. The spelling of his name as Joannes van Houbracken (with and without the c, with and without 'van') follows signatures on some of his paintings.

He was likely born in Antwerp. It is not clear with whom he trained. He was believed to have trained with Rubens and Matthias Stom in the past, but this is no longer accepted. He travelled to Italy in the 1620s like many Flemish artists of his generation such as Anthony van Dyck. In the 1630s he moved from Rome to Naples and ultimately to Messina in Sicily. Here he familiarized himself with the work of the local Caravaggist Alonzo Rodriguez.

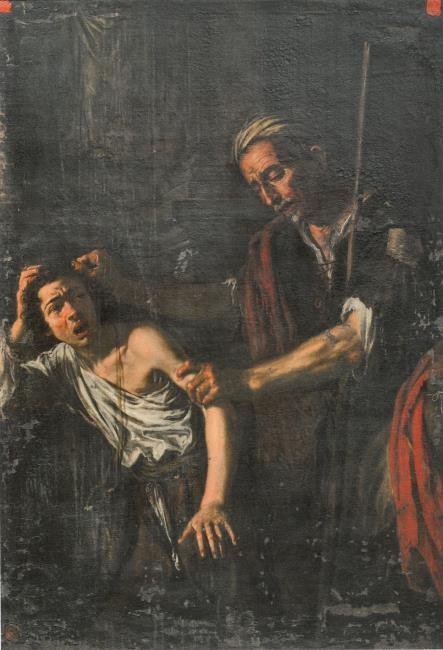
The sense of touch

He resided in Messina from 1631 to 1636. He received a commission from the order of San Francesco dei Mercanti in Messina in 1631 for a Mary with child and St. Francis. This work was partly destroyed during an earthquake in 1908. A work dated 1635 or 1636 is in Messina.

He had returned by 1652 to his hometown Antwerp where he is recorded until 1661. He married and his son Hector or Ettore was believed to have been born in Antwerp. Joannes shipped paintings via Amsterdam to Lisbon in 1652. Together with his son Hector he sent several shipments with brushes, water color paintings, gilded sculptures and a golden 'Virgin' with diamonds and rubies to Messina between December 1655 and July 1661. A work signed and dated 1657 indicates he may have been present in Randazzo in that year, unless the painting had been shipped from Antwerp to Randazzo.

His son Hector or Ettore, who is believed to have been born in Antwerp, later returned to Messina where he married a local woman who was the daughter of Nicola Francesco Maffei, an architect. He was also active as a painter and art dealer but his oeuvre is unknown. His son Nicola was born in Messina. The family remained in Messina until they left it for Livorno in 1674 following the Messina revolt against Spanish rule. Nicola became a successful still life painter, who worked for local patrons and also sent works to all parts of the country.

It is not clear when or where Joannes died.

== Work ==
He painted religious compositions and allegorical genre scenes. He became familiar in Italy with the work of the followers of Caravaggio and, in particular, those active in the south of Italy such as Ribera and Alonzo Rodriguez. He is influenced by Rodriguez' interpretation of the work of Caravaggio,

His oldest known work was the Discovery of the bodies of St. Placidus and company, painted in the Church of Maria dell'Arco in Messina, now in the Interdisciplinary Regional Museum of Messina. To him has also been attributed a series of the five senses in the Bellomo Palace Regional Gallery of which the date is unknown. The style of the five works in the series shows a mix of his Flemish training and the work of Caravaggio and Ribera. A Crucifixion with May, John and Mary Magdalene dated 1657 has a classicist composition.

His style shows the Flemish eye for detail and the dramatic effects of the southern Italian Caravaggist school with its emphasis on pathos. The intense, melancholy drama of his works is heightened by the use of cold colors and strong light effects, which contrast with the otherwise muted palette.
