= Santa Maria Assunta, Randazzo =

Church building in Randazzo, Italy

Coordinates: 37.87903°N 14.94896°E

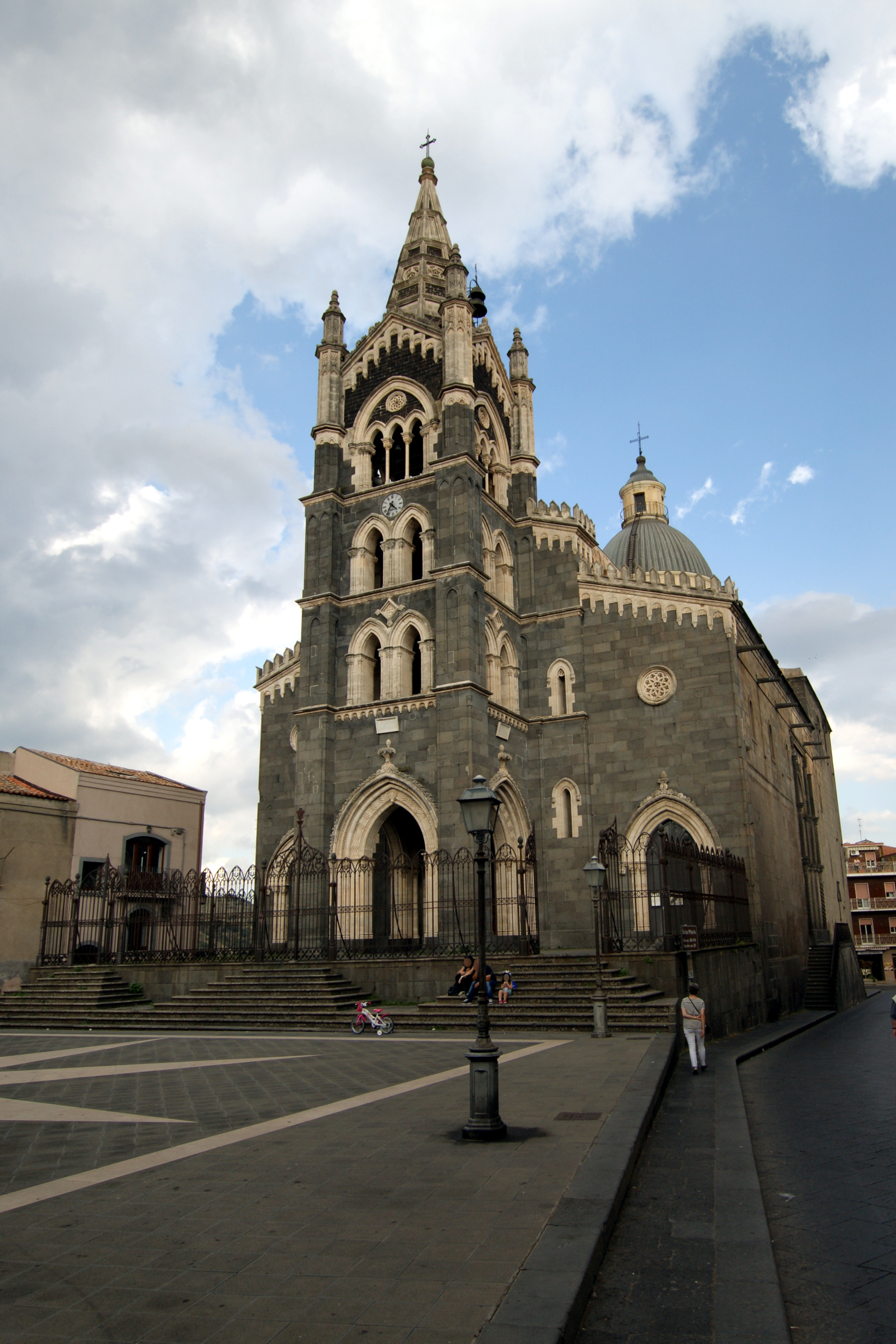
Facade of church with transept dome visible.

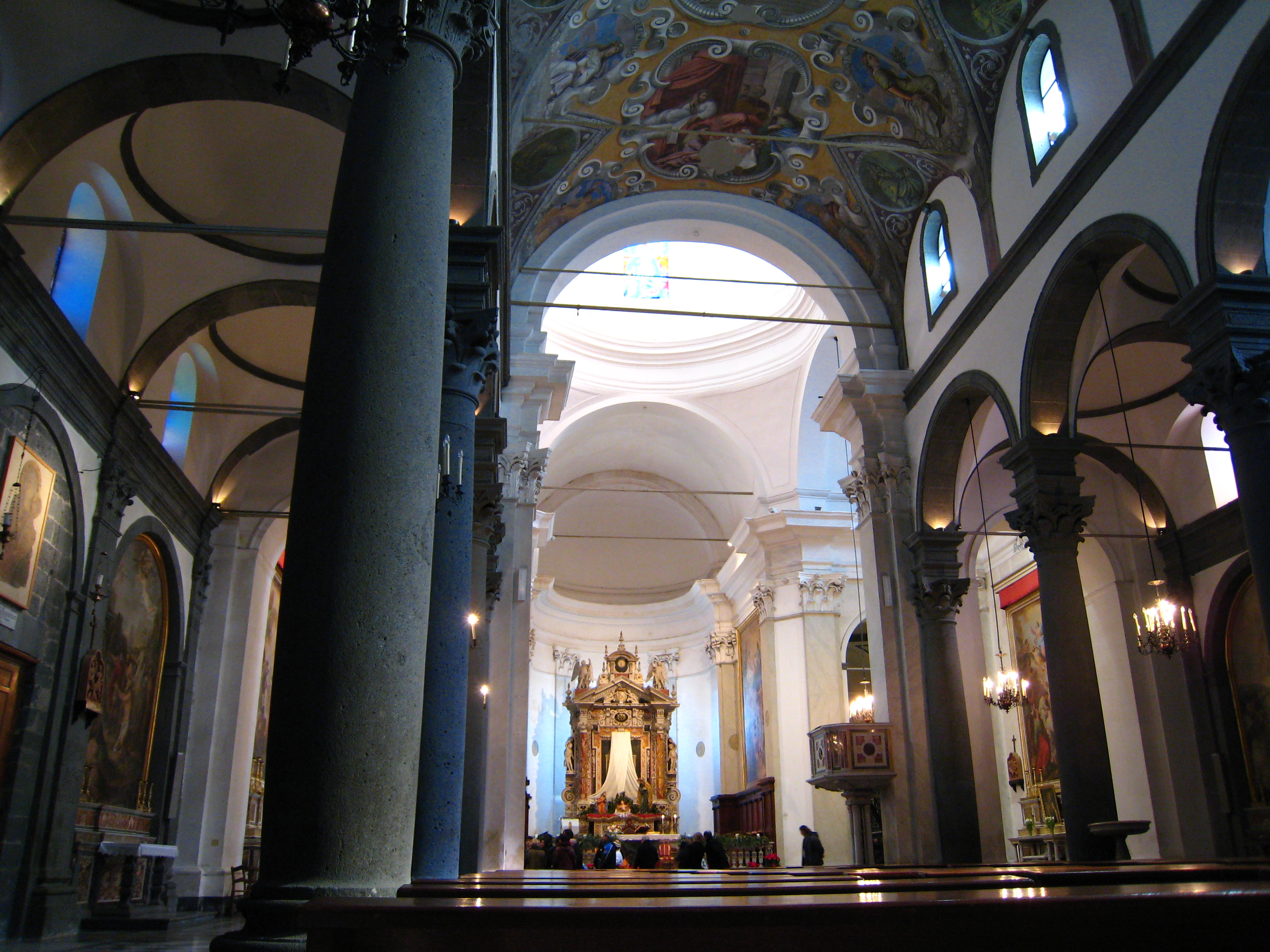
Nave interior toward main altar

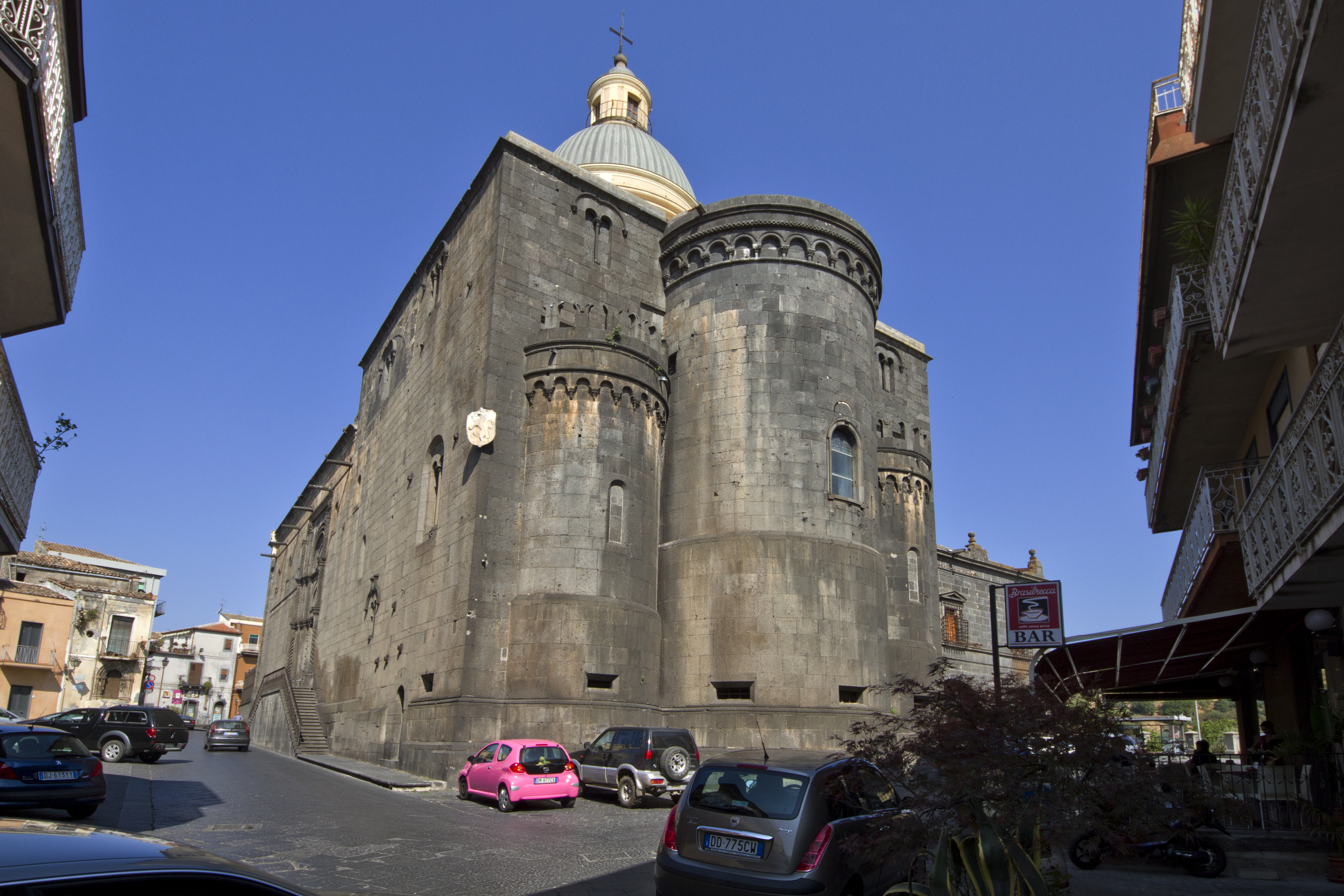
Exterior view of apse

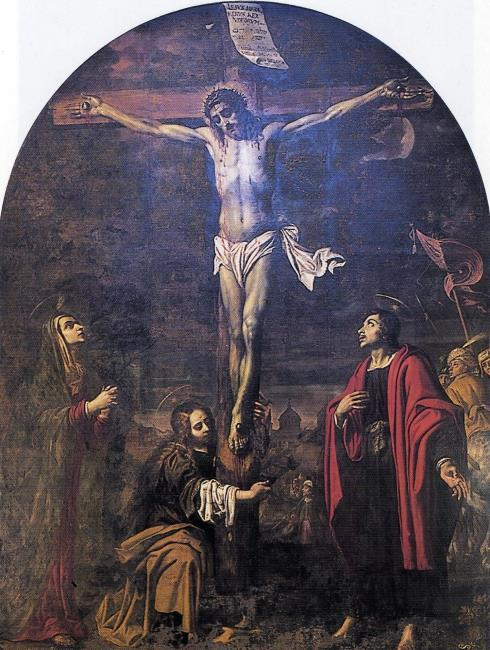
Altarpiece by Joannes van Houbraken depicting Crucifixion with Mary, John and Mary Magdalene

Santa Maria Assunta is a Roman Catholic basilica church located in Randazzo in the region of Sicily, Italy.

== History and description ==
A church at the site was initially built in the 13th century, according to an inscription found below the sacristy dated 1239. Different portions of the church are built in different styles. The oldest configuration is the Romanesque semicircular apses with a merlionated cornice along the roofline and gothic elements. Some of the tall narrow windows in the apse have been walled up. The church has a wide central nave and two aisles and a cruciform transept near the apse. Much of the construction used the black lava stones. The interior nave has a simple Renaissance style, recalling Brunelleschi churches in Florence, likely imposed by the Tuscan architect Andrea Calamech (1524-1589). The aisles have few windows on high, but they have elaborate sculpted romanesque and rounded portals with braided 3/4 columns. The nave ceiling was frescoed with scenes from the life of the Virgin by Filippo Tancredi.

The original gothic belltower stands in the center of the facade, and like the entire facade was restored in a Gothic Revival style only in 1863. The windows hearken to the style of the original mullioned windows seen in the apse and transept, but the white stone frames for windows and portal create a contrast with the unicolor older sections. However, this facade by Cristoforo Vanaria and Giuseppe Plumari, incorporates elements present in the original bell-tower as documented in 17th-century drawings by Sebastiano Ittar. The sacristy was rebuilt between 1672-1679, by the architect Agostino Scilla after its collapse during a storm.

Among the altarpieces are six works by Giuseppe Velasques: a Martyrdom of St James, an Annunciation, an Assumption of the Virgin, Coronation of Mary, and Martyrdom of St Andrew. His Holy Family remained incomplete. The lunette frescoed with the Virgin saving the city of Randazzo from the Lava flow was painted by Alibrandi. Other paintings include an Assumption of the Virgin was painted by Giovanni Caniglia; a Martyrdom of St Agatha and St Lawrence by Onofrio Gabrielli; and a Martyrdom of St Sebastian by Daniele Monteleone; and a Baptism of Jesus by Francesco Paolo Finocchiaro.
