= Santa Maria dei Candeli =

Former Roman Catholic church

Coordinates: 43°46′25.95″N 11°15′50.22″E

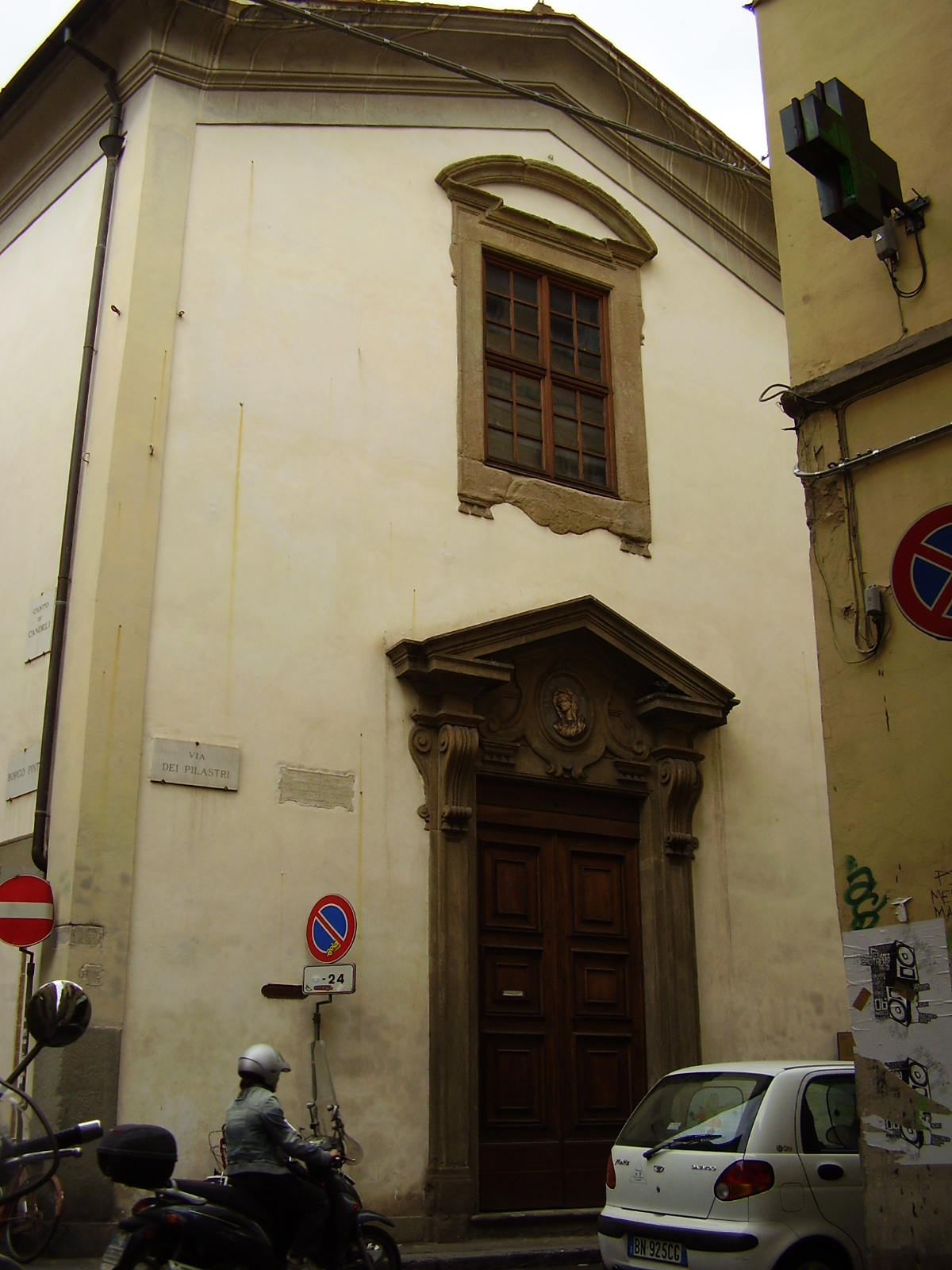
La facciata su Via de' Pilastri

Santa Maria dei Candeli is a former Roman Catholic church situated in the Borgo Pinti in central Florence, Region of Tuscany, Italy.

== History ==
Initially founded in 13–14th centuries as a convent; the present structure was enlarged starting 1558, with a radical rebuilding in 1703 by the Baroque artist Giovanni Battista Foggini. The ceiling is frescoed with the Assumption by Niccolò Lapi, the right wall houses a St Clair by Francesco Botti and a St Augustine by Jacopo Vignali. The main altarpiece is an Immaculate Conception by Carlo Sacconi, flanked by a Transit of St Joseph by Tommaso Redi.

The monastic order was suppressed by the Napoleonic occupation, and the adjacent monastery became successively an orphanage, an asylum, and finally a lyceum for training policemen. The Renaissance frescoes detached from the refectory depict a Last Supper, Annunciation, and Adoration of the Bambino, formerly attributed to Franciabigio, but which some now attribute to Giovanni Antonio Sogliani.
