= Francesco Paolo Finocchiaro =

Italian painter

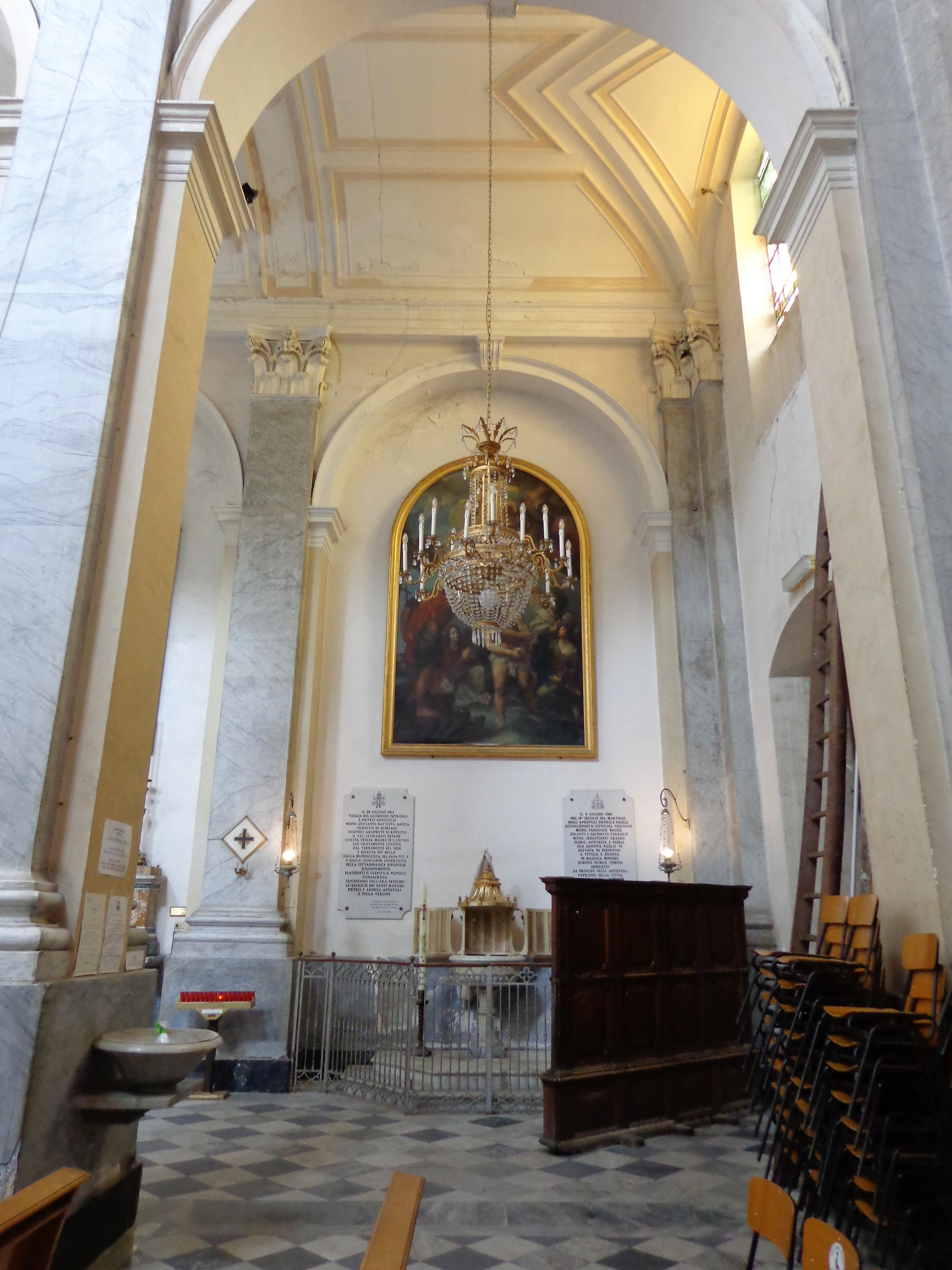
One of Francesco Paolo Finicchiaro’s works

Francesco Paolo Finocchiaro (15 March 1868 – 26 April 1947) was an Italian painter, known mostly for his portraits.

== Biography ==
He was born in Randazzo in the Sicily. He studied at the Istituto di Belle Arti di Napoli, under Domenico Morelli. He then spent five years in Rome, supporting himself by painting portraits. He did have a commission to paint a Baptism of Jesus for the Basilica church of Santa Maria Assunta in Randazzo. He made copies of a painting by Prospero Piatti found in the Duomo di Ferrara, and of an Enthroned Madonna by Pietro Vanni and other paintings. He traveled for some time to Ferrara and Paris.

In the final years of the 19th-century and first few of the 20th, he moved to United States. In 1902, he married Florence Angel Manson. Their only son died prematurely. In the United States, he was able to find success. He painted multiple portraits, including those of Enrico Caruso, Theodore and Eleanor Roosevelt, and the Ambassador des Planches.

Returning to Italy, first to Rome then Randazzo. In 1930, he settled in Taormina, where he died.
