= Nicola van Houbraken =

Italian painter (1660 – 1723)

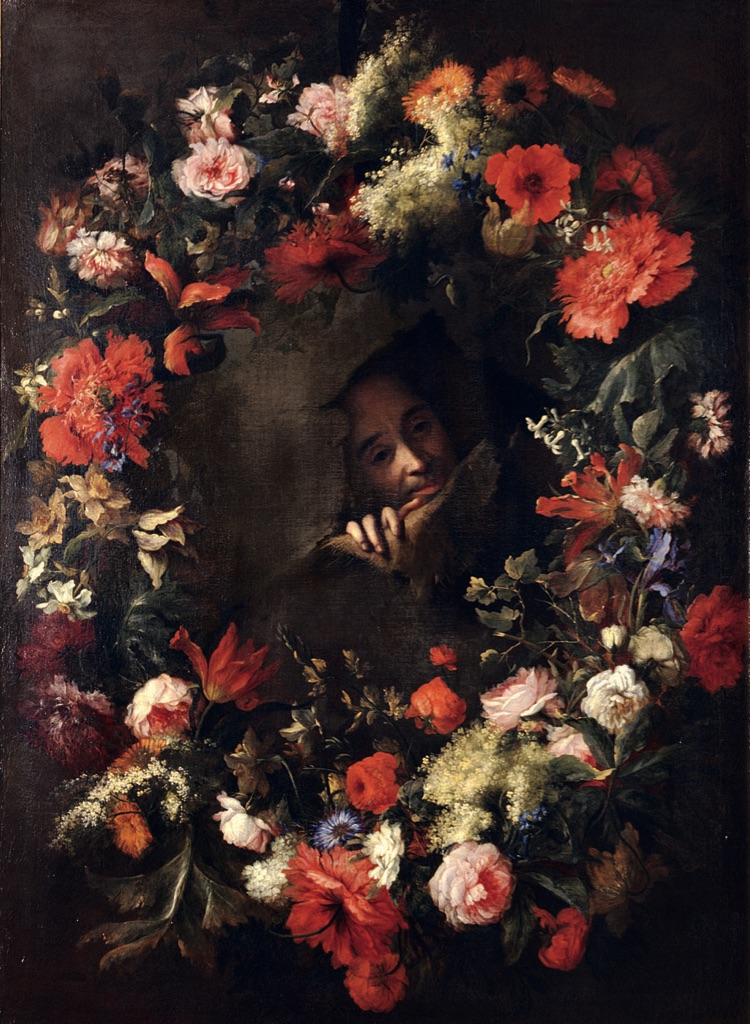
Possibly a Self-portrait or a portrait of François Rivière

Nicola or Nicolino or Niccolino van Houbraken, also known as Nicolino Vanderbrach da Messina and Nicola Messinese (1660 – 1723) was an Italian painter of the late-Baroque who was of Flemish descent. He specialized in paintings depicting playful arrangements of fruits, vegetables, vegetation, animals, game in interiors or in forests. He also painted allegories and garland paintings. His work was appreciated by the Medici court in Florence.

== Life ==
Nicola was born in Messina to a Flemish father and a local mother. Nicola's father, Ettore (or Hector, died 1723), and his grandfather, Joannes (Giovanni) van Houbraken (Houbracken) (originally from Antwerp), were both history painters and art dealers. Joannes van Houbraken was likely born in Antwerp around 1600 and had moved to Italy around 1620 where he established himself in Messina. He later returned to Antwerp from which he engaged in trade with Italy in paintings and painting materials. Nicola's father is believed to have been born in Antwerp. He returned to Messina where he married the daughter of Nicola Francesco Maffei, an architect. He was also active as a painter and art dealer but his oeuvre is unknown. After Nicola's birth the family remained in Messina until they left it for Livorno in 1674 following the Messina revolt against Spanish rule.

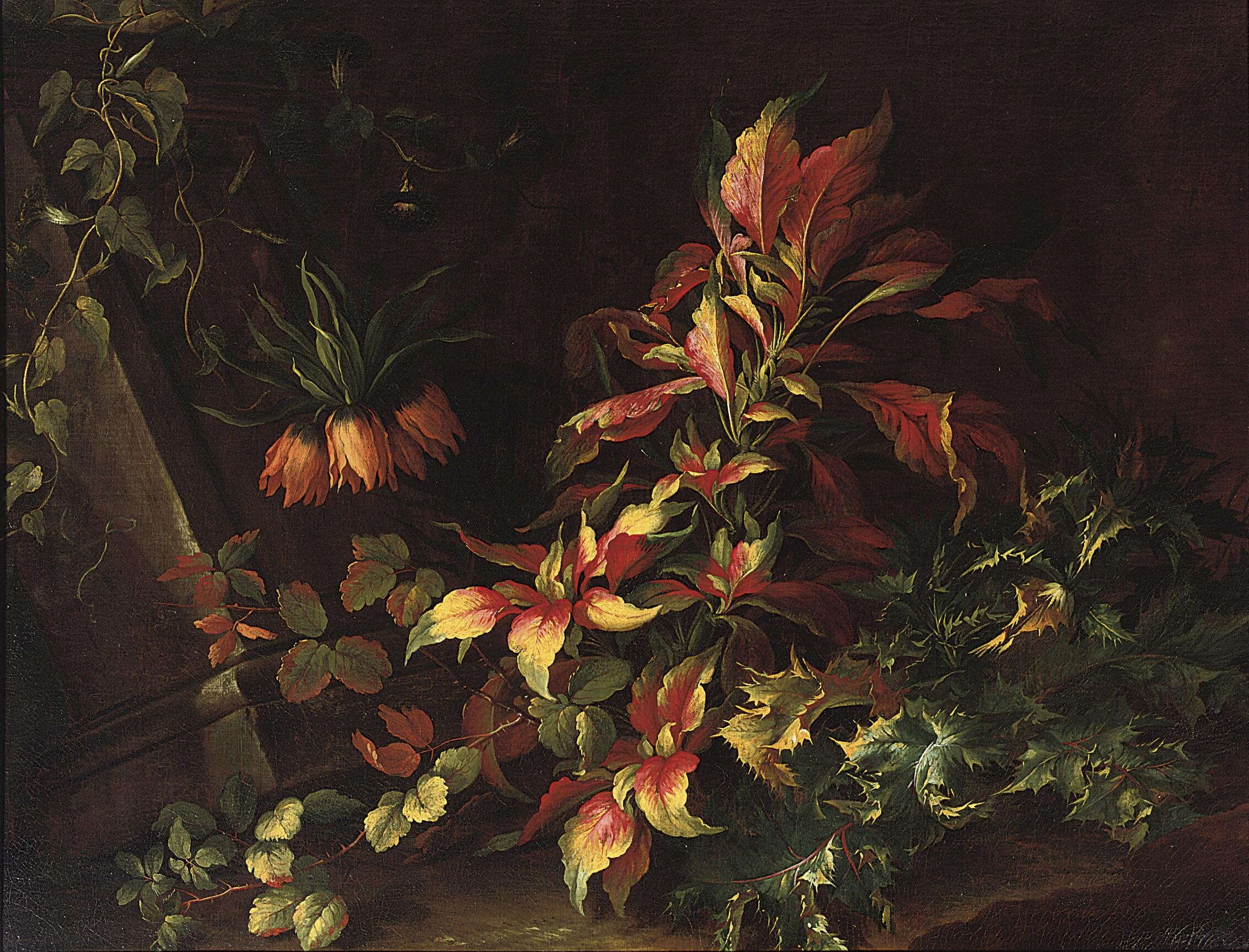
Forest floor with flowers and thistles

Nicola became a successful still life painter, who worked for local patrons and also sent works to all parts of the country. His works were appreciated by the court of the Medici who were then the rulers over Livorno. The Medici were known for their passion for flowers, a passion that had its origins in the collection of roses and carnations of Cosimo de' Medici and Ferdinando II. The Grand Duke requested Nicola to send him a portrait of himself for his gallery of self-portraits in the Galleria dell'Accademia.

Nicola married Caterina Valsisi with whom he had a daughter named Maria Teresa. The daughter also studied art and died in 1765 in Livorno. In 1706 and 1724 he exhibited some of his works in the Accademia delle Arti del Disegno in Florence. In 1704, 1706 and 1729 his works were exhibited in the Santissima Annunziata in Florence.

He died in Livorno between 1724 and 1733.

== Work ==
=== General ===
He specialized in paintings depicting playful arrangements of fruits, vegetables, vegetation, animals and game set in interiors and forests. He also painted garland paintings and allegorical scenes. His forest still lifes continue the tradition of the works of Otto Marseus van Schrieck, who was one of the first practitioners of this genre. As van Houbraken only rarely put his monogram on his paintings, it has been a difficult task to put together his oeuvre as we well as to confirm the chronology. It is assumed that his darker paintings with the most obvious symbolic connotations were creations from his early career.

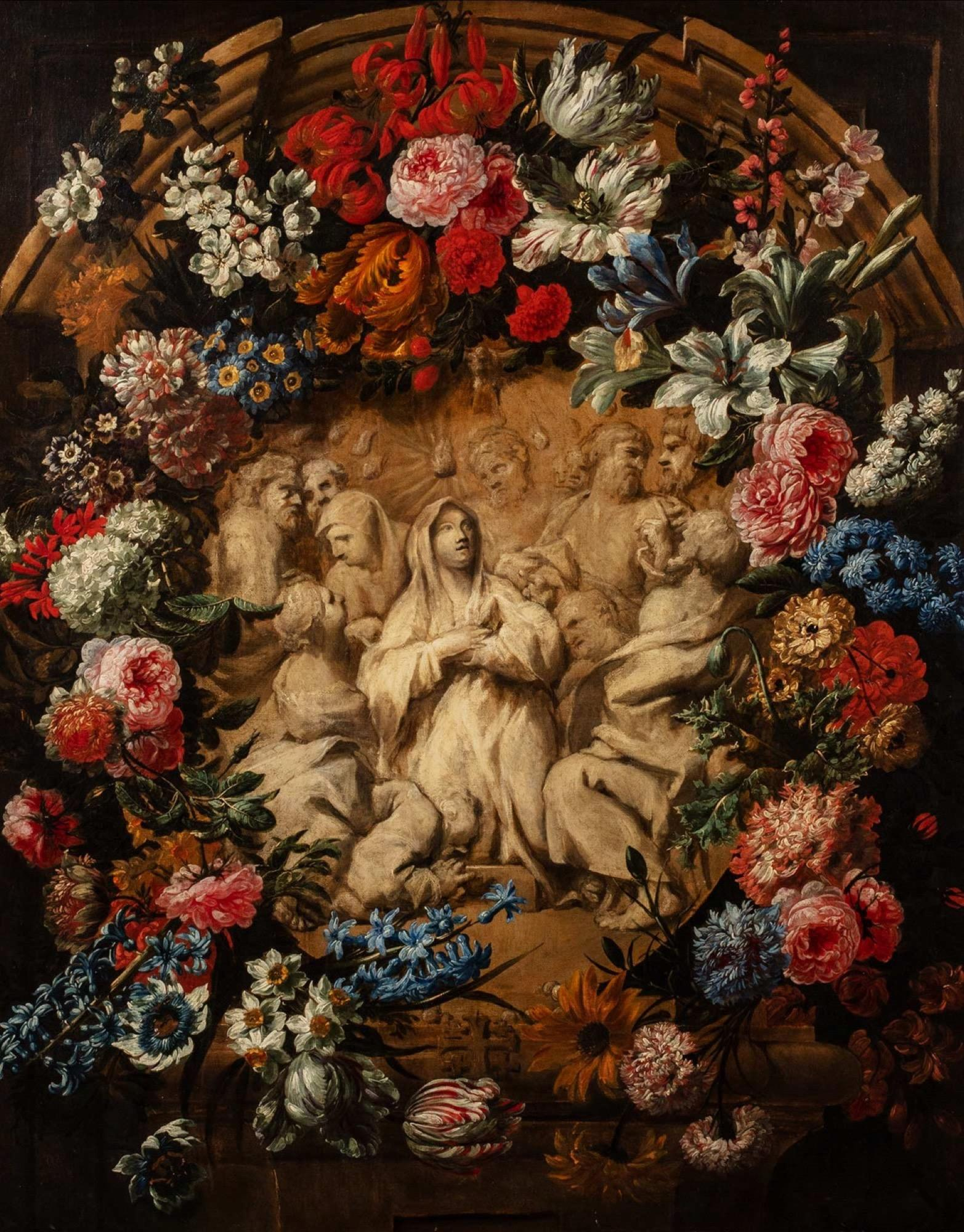
Trompe-l'œil with a marble bas relief representing the Pentecost with flowers

Characteristic of the artist's style are the rapid touches of light imprinted on tiny leaves and the bold brushstrokes which depict the flowers in a neat manner so that they are set off from the dark background. Nicola displayed a precision and technical mastery in portraying different botanical species with extreme realism and naturalness. This allows scholars to distinguish between the different species that he depicts. The floral repertoire presented so lucidly in the painting makes van Houbraken an "expert florist". Nicola was particularly known for his paintings depicting herbs and vegetation, Together with the thistles, exotic species known as the amaranthus tricolor is one of the most recurring flower species in his oeuvre. It appears in twelve of the artist's works and thus functions as a kind of unmistakable acronym for his paintings. His compositions are rich in charm and a chromatic range with a preference for icy and crystalline tones, recalling the work of Abraham Brueghel. His still lifes also reflect the influence of contemporary Tuscan production of the Florentine and Lucca school of Bartolomeo Bimbi and Andrea Scacciati.

He is known to have collaborated with specialist landscape and figure painters on works to which he contributed the still life elements and the collaborator the landscape and figures. It is known he worked with three other artists on a Landscape with hermits, formerly in the Gherardesca Collection. In this work Alessandro Magnasco painted the figures, Marco Ricci the landscape, the unknown Bianchi di Livorno the stones and Nicola van Houbraken the herbs.

=== Garland paintings ===
Some of van Houbraken's works fall into the genre of the so-called 'garland paintings'. Garland paintings are a type of still life popularized in early 17th century Antwerp by Jan Brueghel the Elder and subsequently practised by leading Flemish still life painters, such as Daniel Seghers. Paintings in this genre initially showed a flower or, less frequently, fruit garland around a devotional image or portrait. In the later development of the genre, the devotional image was replaced by other subjects such as portraits, mythological subjects and allegorical scenes. Daniel Seghers developed the illusionistic aspects of the genre by replacing the cartouche portraits with paintings of bas reliefs and sculptures. By using trompe-l'œil effects, Seghers was able to create the illusion of three-dimensionality, for instance by including elements that look as if they protrude outside of the picture frame. The aim was to give the viewer the impression that they were not looking at a painting but at a real garland of flowers around a genuine sculptured cartouche. Abraham Brueghel, the grandson of Jan Brueghel the Elder, introduced the genre into Italy where he worked for 40 years, first in Rome and then in Naples where he died in 1697. The Calabrian Prince Antonio Ruffo was an admirer of Brueghel’s works several of which he collected at his palace near Messina. Van Houbraken may have become familiar with the garland paintings there.

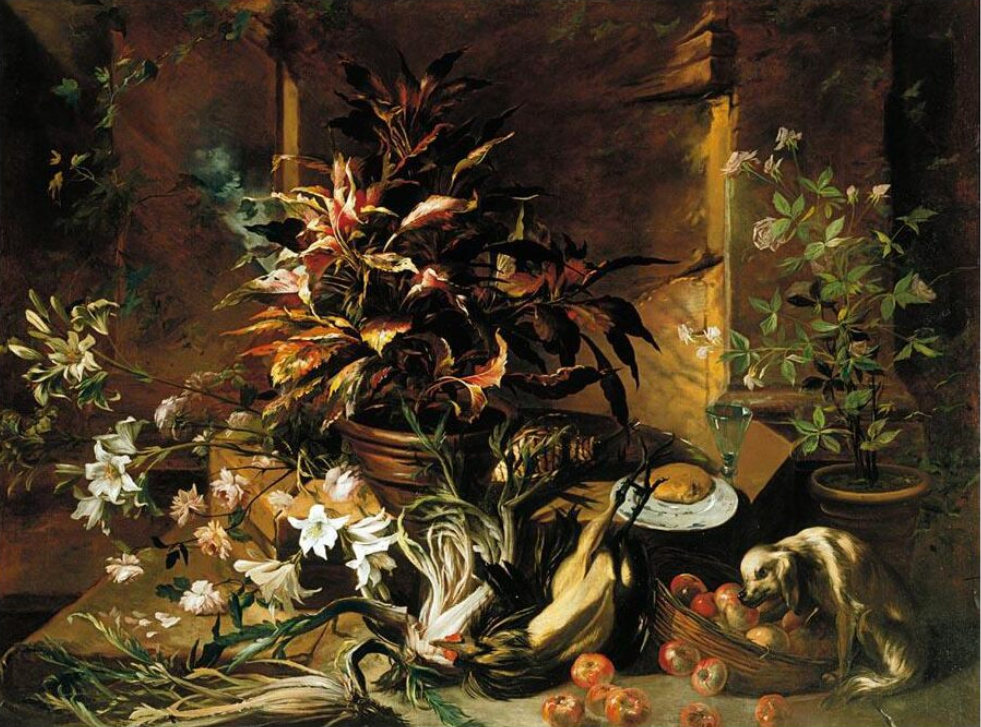
Still life with potted plants and roses, a dog, an apple basket, fennel, and a semi-plucked rooster

An example of a garland painting by van Houbraken is the Trompe-l'œil with a marble bas relief representing the Pentecost with flowers (Finarte S.p.A. Old Master Paintings and 19th Century Art sale of 25 November 2019 lot 339). This garland painting shows a garland of flowers around a cartouche which is a trompe-l'œil bas relief representing the Pentecost.

=== The self-portrait that wasn’t ===
Another example of a garland painting is one of his paintings in the collection of the Uffizi Gallery in Florence, which shows a flower garland frame which in this case encircles a portrait of a man. This work was traditionally identified with the self-portrait that he was believed to have sent to the Grand Duke. Art historians have now shown that the painting is in fact not a self-portrait but a portrait of the French painter François Rivière who worked in Livorno. The misidentification of the sitter happened already in the 18th century. It probably has its roots in the fact that the head of the sitter emerges from the shadow tilted towards the viewer as if it were the artist's reflection in a mirror. The date of the work is not known with certainty. The traditionally estimated date of 1720 has been questioned by certain art historians who place the date of the work at the end of the 17th century. The painting may possibly be identified with a canvas presented at the art exhibition held in 1729 in the cloisters of the Santissima Annunziata in Florence which was described in the catalogue of that same year as a flower painting by Wan-ou-bru-ken with inside the portrait of Mr. Riviera.

The portrait itself is created with a highly illusionistic trompe-l'œil effect. It appears as if the head of the sitter is peeking out through a big gash in the canvas the lower side of which he holds down with his right hand. The effect thus created resembles that in some of the illusionistic portraits of the Dutch painters Gerard Dou and Samuel van Hoogstraten which show people extending their head or hand through a painted window. Van Houbraken goes one step further in creating the illusion that the portrayed person and the canvas are part of the same reality by letting the sitter peek out from an illusory gash in the canvas.

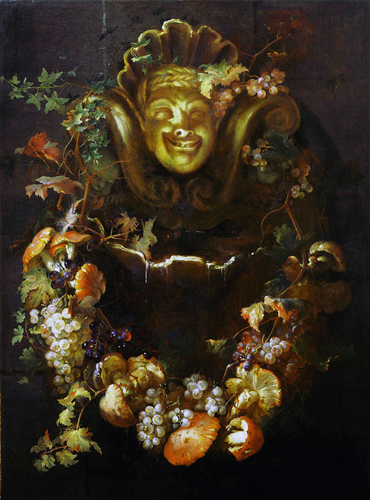
Still life with fountain and garland of flowers and fruit

The presumed sitter for the portrait François Rivière has a wry, melancholy smile on his face. This may have to do with the fact that despite his obvious talents as an artist he was not able to achieve commercial success in Livorno and was living in poverty. The smile of the sitter may also refer to the genre of works for which François Rivière was known, which were mainly small-scale comical (cunning) genre scenes.

A pendant to this so-called Self-portrait is also held at the Uffizi. It is called Still life with a fountain and a garland of flowers and fruit. It shows a garland of fruit, mushrooms and other vegetation suspended around a fountain. The upper part of the fountain comprises a mask attached to a sculpted shell held by two volutes. It has been suggested that the pendant paintings depict the competition between sculpture and painting. This was a common topic of discussion in the art community throughout 17th-century Europe. The two sides of the discussion put forward their arguments as to why either art form was superior to the other. It is clear that van Houbraken takes the side of painting, represented by the Portrait of François Rivière. Its superiority is shown by its ability to create near-realistic imitations of life while sculpture, represented by the Still life with a fountain and a garland of flowers and fruit, can only recreate a lifeless image of reality.

Another motif at play in this painting is that of vanitas, i.e. the reflection on the fleetingness and ultimate meaninglessness of all worldly pursuits as they will all end in death and destruction. Flowers are the perfect symbol for this motif as they typically only last for a season before they wither and die.

=== Allegorical scenes ===
He also painted allegorical scenes with an important still life element such as the Allegory of winter and Allegory of summer (im Kinski auction of 18–20 June 2013 lot 3800A). Winter is personified by a handsome, half-naked man. Summer, the time of harvest, is brimming with abundance.
