= Giusella Finocchiaro =

Giusella Finocchiaro is Professor of Private Law and Internet Law at the University of Bologna, Italy. She is also the founder of her own private legal practice.

Besides her professional role, Giusella Finocchiaro is also the Chairperson of Working Group 4 (Electronic Commerce) of UNCITRAL (the United Nations Commission on International Trade Law). She has been Chairperson since 28 April 2014.

Her professional field of interest focuses on research into Privacy Law on the Internet. She is the author of 9 books and editor of 6 books. She has also written more than one hundred articles in the field of e-Commerce, Electronic Signatures, Intellectual Property Rights and Digital Identity.

She is the President of the Fondazione del Monte di Bologna e Ravenna, for the 2015-2020 mandate.

From 2007 to 2009 she was a member of the European Network and Information Security Agency Permanent Stakeholders Group ENISA Permanent Stakeholders Group members 2007-2009 (Report). ENISA. 2007.
