= Polidoro da Lanciano =

Italian painter

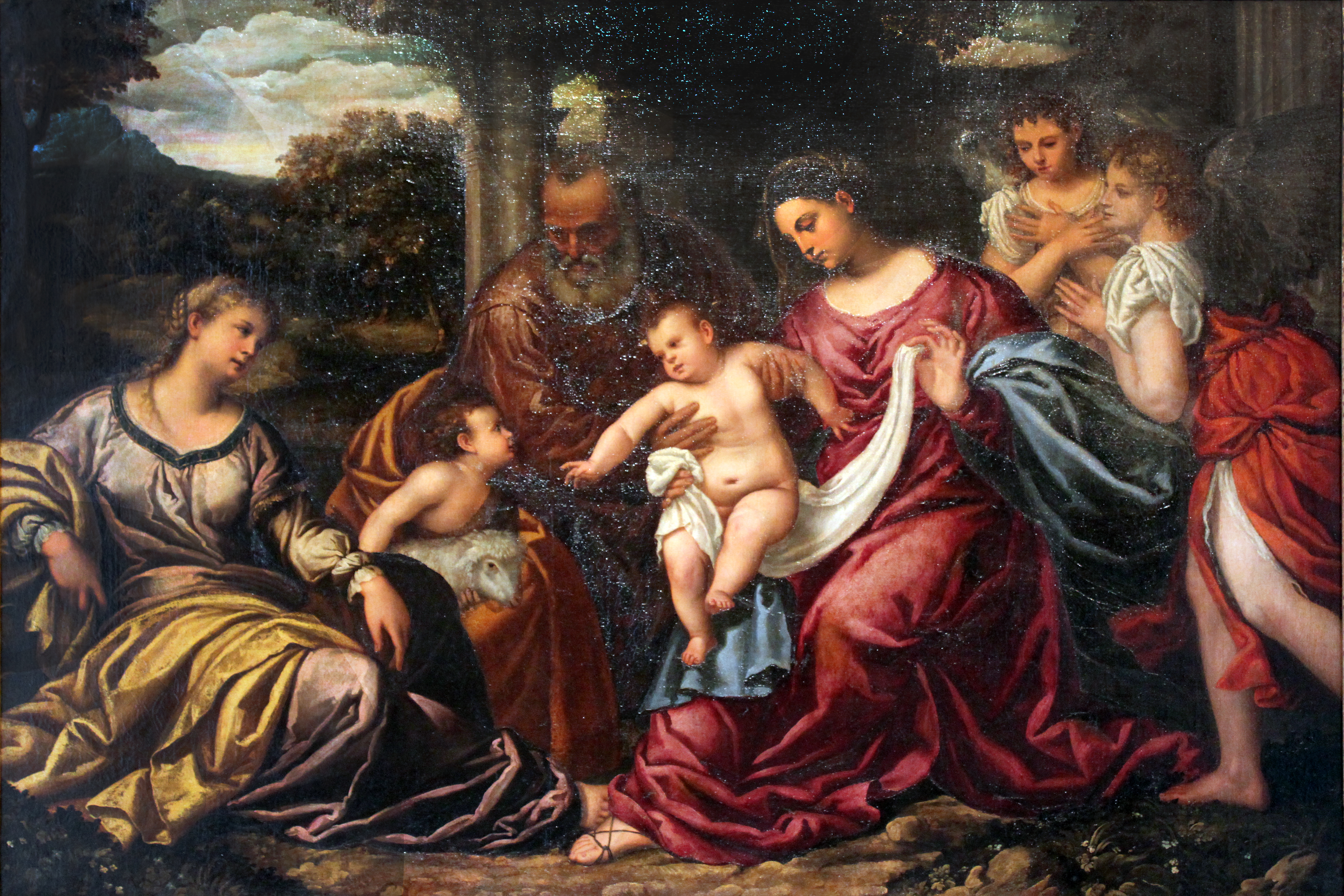
Polidoro from Lanciano: The Holy Family with St. Catherine of Alexandria and the Infant St. John

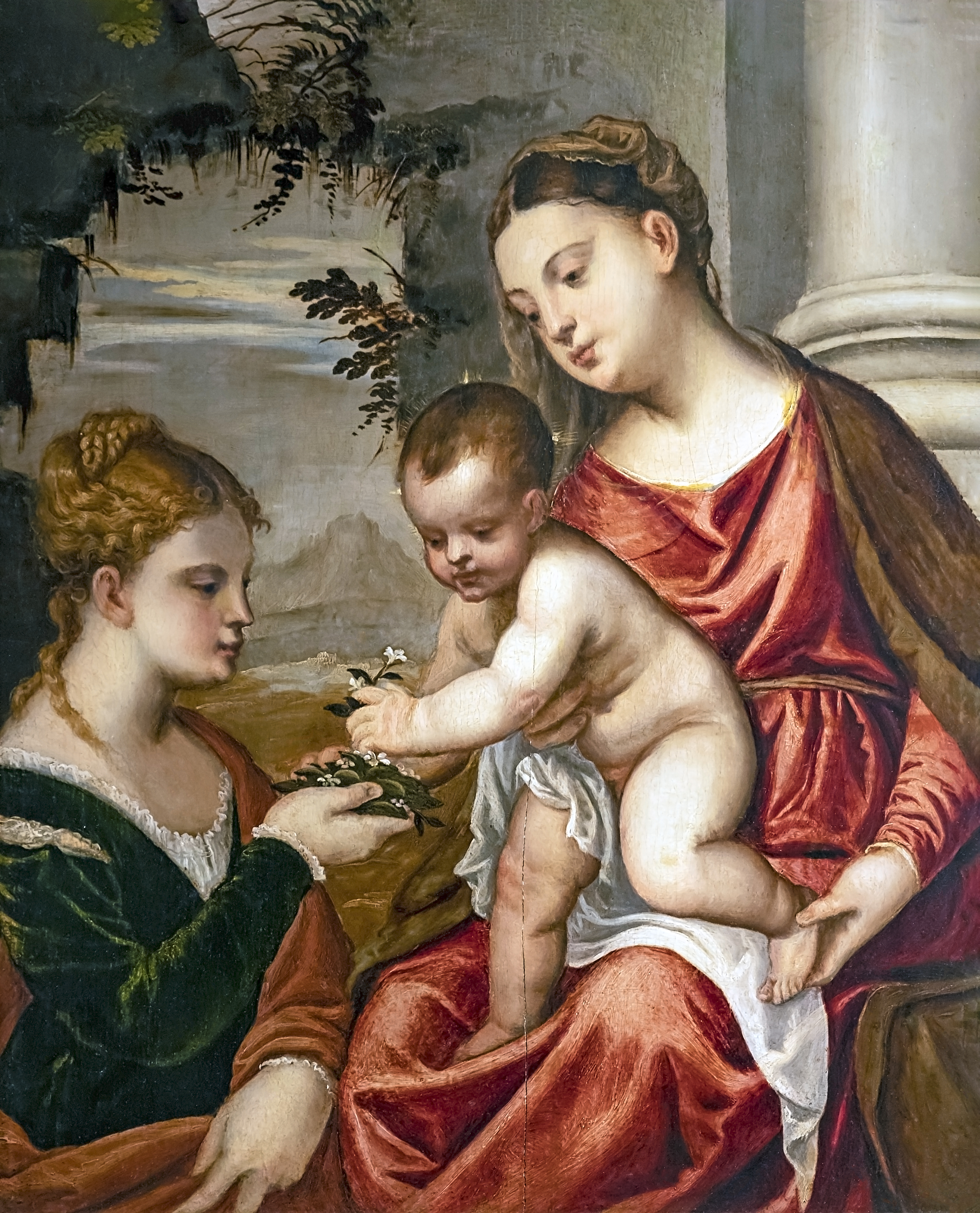
Mystical marriage of Saint Catherine, Ca' Rezzonico Venice

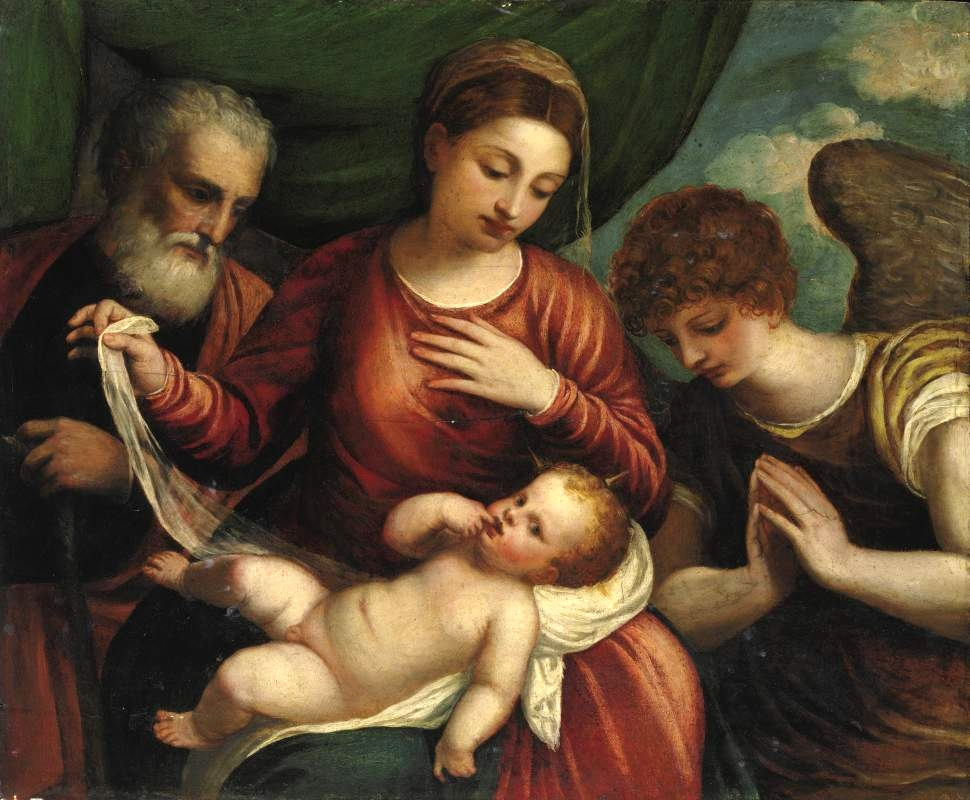
Polidoro da Lanciano, Holy Family with an Angel, c. 1540. (Private collection)

Polidoro de Rienzo da Lanciano (Lanciano, 1515–1565) was an Italian painter.

Relatively little is known of his life. He was born in Lanciano, a town that is a few miles inland from Ortona, a port on the Adriatic Sea. This is in the Abruzzi region of Italy, lying southeast of Pescara. His grandfather, Alessandro Rienzo, was a ceramic painter in Lanciano. Based on Venetian documents Polydoro's birthdate is taken to be 1515. At an early age he apparently showed great artistic talent. and for that reason he moved to Venice, the center of art in that region of Italy, at a young age. There he assumed a Venetian form for his name, Lanzani. His first mention in official Venetian documents is 1536, when he would have been 21 years of age. He probably came to Venice at least five years prior to that in order to begin his artistic training. His name appears as a witness to a document in the years 1536 and 1549. His Last Will and Testament bears his signature, and is dated 20 July 1565. He died the following day, with his age reported as 50. He likely worked as an assistant to Titian (c.1488/90-1576) for many years, especially given the close resemblance of his style with that of the Venetian master. This would have been in the 1530s and possibly early 1540s. It is not known whether he then set up his own studio, but that was common practice. Polidoro was also influenced by Bonifacio Veronese (1487–1557), il Pordenone (1484–1539), and later possibly Paolo Veronese (1528–1588).

In the United Kingdom, the following works are documented:

- The Fitzwilliam Museum
  - Holy Family with the Infant St John Baptist and Saint Catherine
  - Virgin and Child with St Catherine, Mary Magdalene and St Barbara
- Glasgow Museums
  - The Mystic Marriage of Saint Catherine c.1540–1550
- The Courtauld Gallery
  - Virgin and Child with Saint Catherine (?) and St Jerome in a Landscape
- Blairs Museum
  - Virgin and Child with St Luke and a Kneeling Donor (Vision of Saint Stanislaus)
- UK Government Art Collection (Circle of Polidoro)
  - Madonna and Child, St Francis and St Joseph with a Donor
- Moseley Old Hall (Circle of Polidoro)
  - Madonna and Child with the Infant St John
