= Santi Jacopo e Filippo, Pisa =

Church in Pisa, Italy

Coordinates: 43°42′31.66″N 10°24′52.34″E

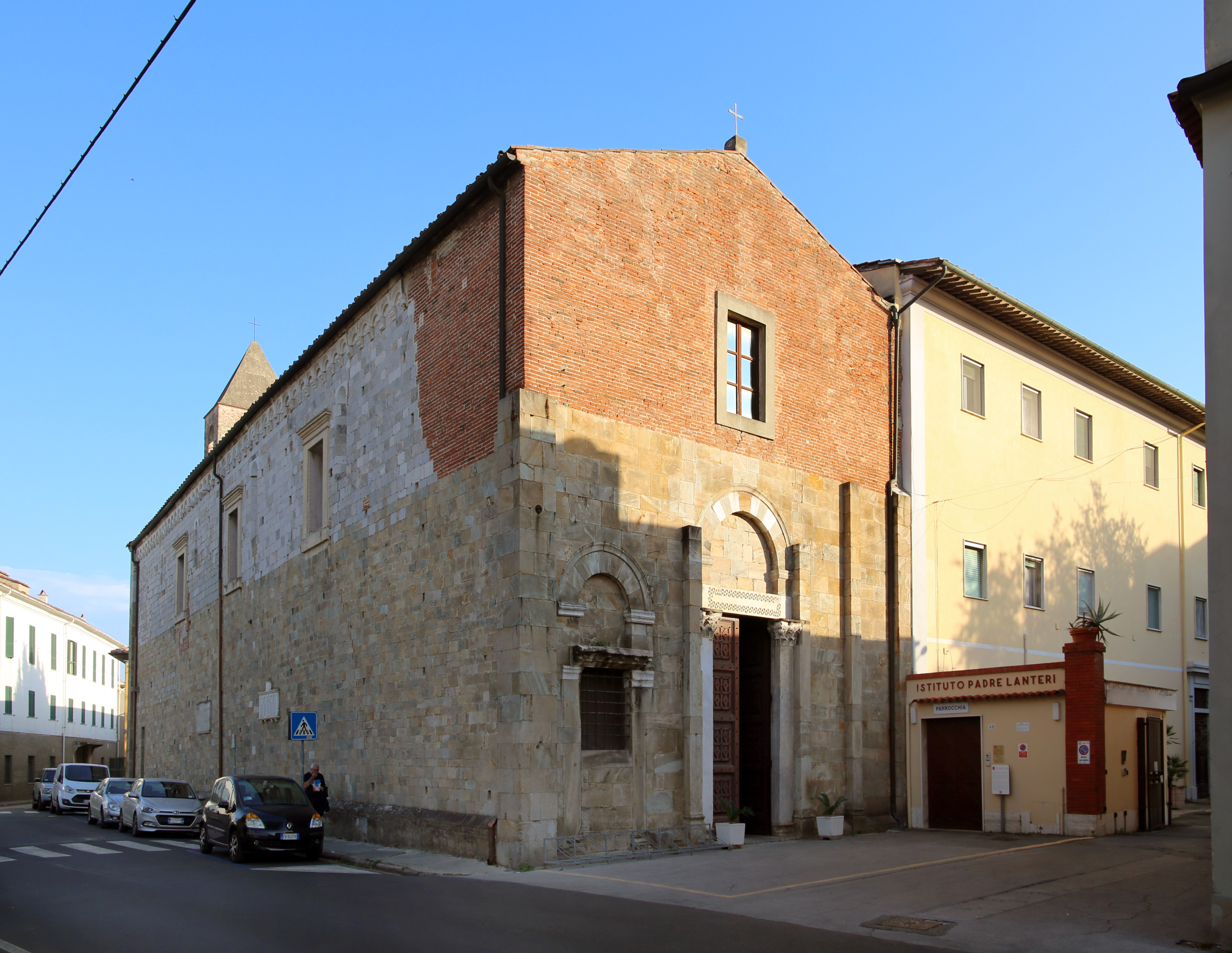
Exterior of Church

Santi Jacopo e Filippo or Santi Iacopo e Filippo (or San Iacopo in Orticaia) is an ancient church found in Via San Michele degli Scalzi in Pisa, Italy.

Documents exist as belonging to an Augustinian abbey by 1110, but it is believed that a church was situated at the site just after the year 1000. The Romanesque architecture includes a half-finished facade. Restored in the 17th and 18th century, the interior was frescoed by Giuseppe Melani and his brother Francesco with stories of the saints.

== Sources ==
- Pisan Tourism Site
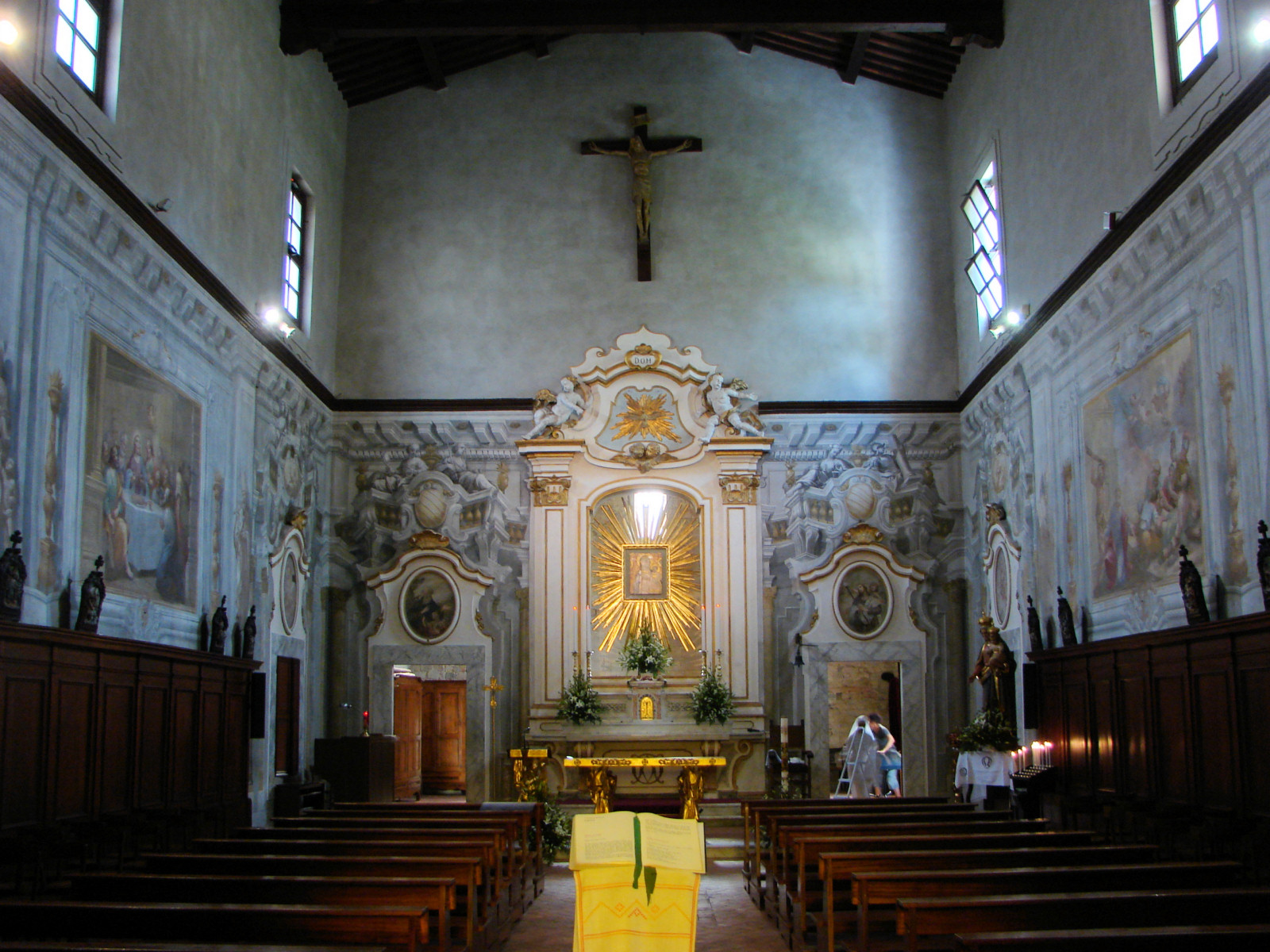
Interior

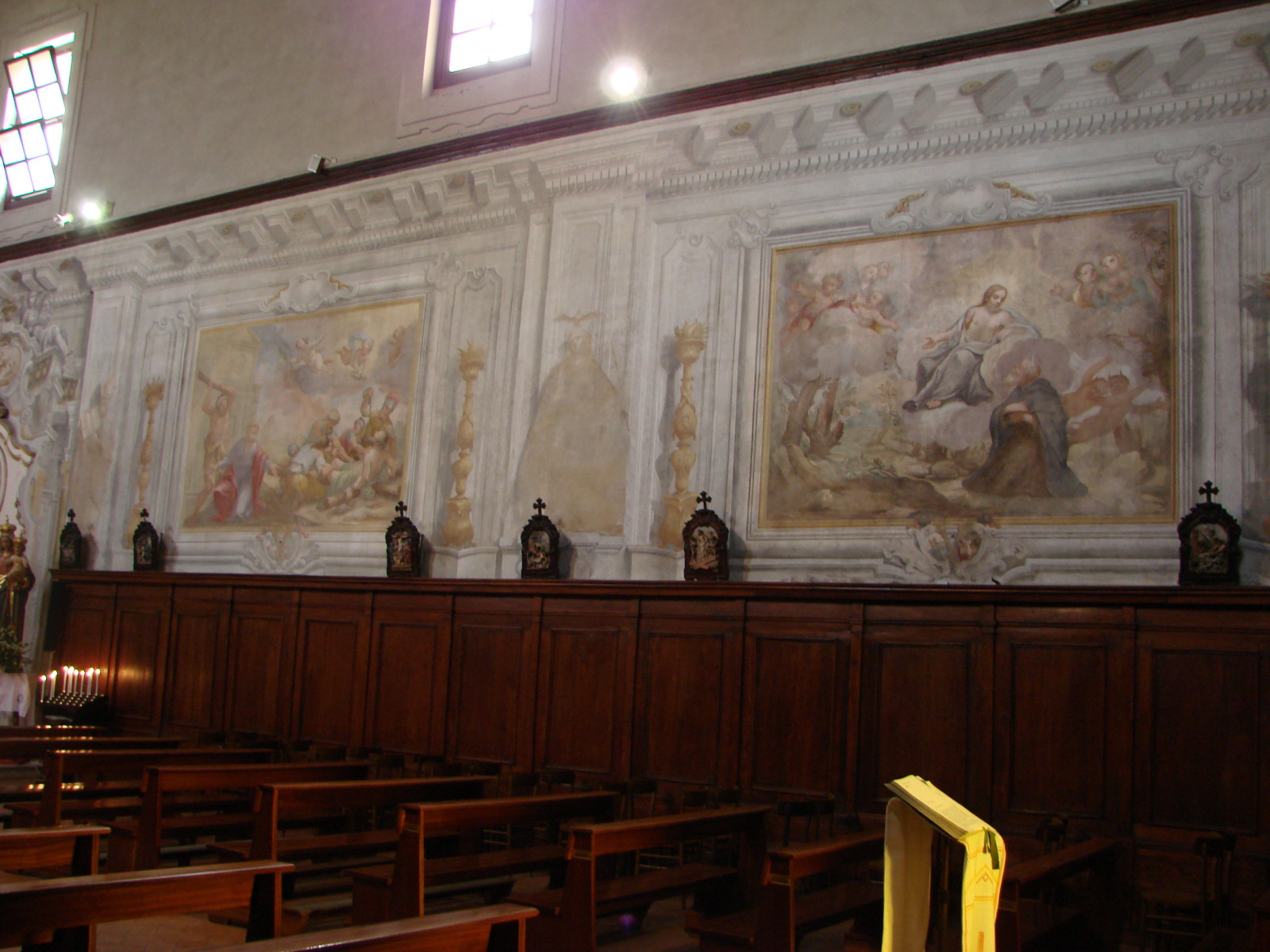
Frescoes

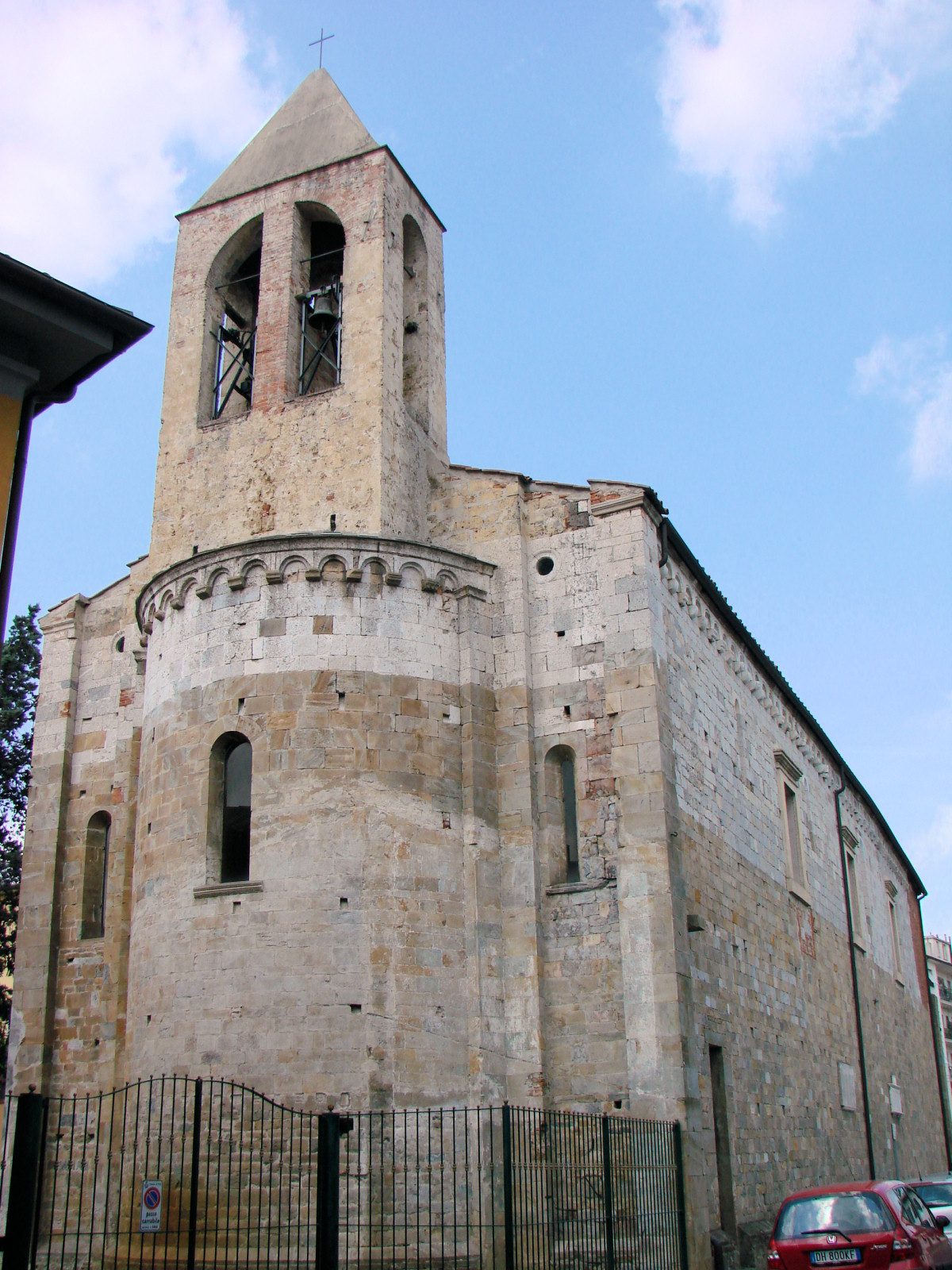
Apse and Belltower
