= Alonzo Rodriguez =

Italian painter

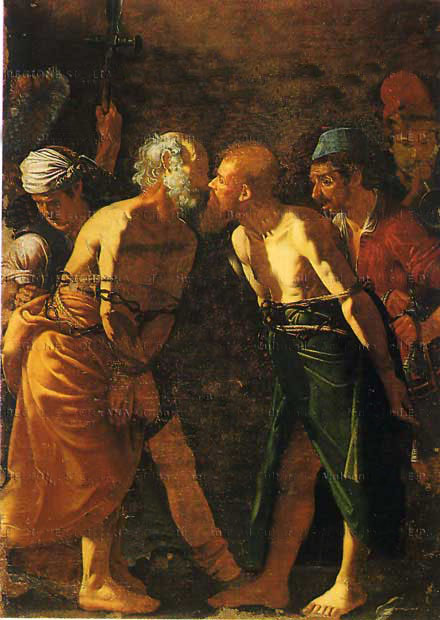
Meeting of Saints Peter and Paul, Messina, Regional Museum

Alonzo Rodriguez (1578 – 22 April 1648), sometimes rendered Alfonso Rodriquez was a painter largely active in Messina. He is thought to have been a follower of Caravaggio.

Rodriguez' career was first recorded by Francesco Susinno in his Le vite de' pittori messinesi, dated 1724. Susinno writes that he had a humanistic education; he studied history and could read Latin.

Alonzo was born in Messina, the son of a Spanish Captain of Cavalry, who had three sons who were painters. His brothers Antonio and Luigi went to Palermo and Rome (or Naples) respectively, while Alonzo went to Venice. He studied Veronese, Tintoretto and Titian. He became a proficient imitator of Titian, so much so that he was accused of forgery and removed himself to Rome. From Rome he went to Naples. By 1614 he was back in Messina, where he enjoyed success, turning out paintings in the style of the Venetian School and of Caravaggio.

Alonzo's style of painting eventually went out of fashion and he fell on hard times. His lack of success and embittered old age earned him few followers, and these were of small importance. Susinno mentions only Jacopo Imperatrice (ca. 1592-1680), Placido Saltamacchia and Pietro Sollima. Rodriguez died in Messina of fever on 22 April 1648.
