= Francesco Botti =

Italian painter (1640–1711)

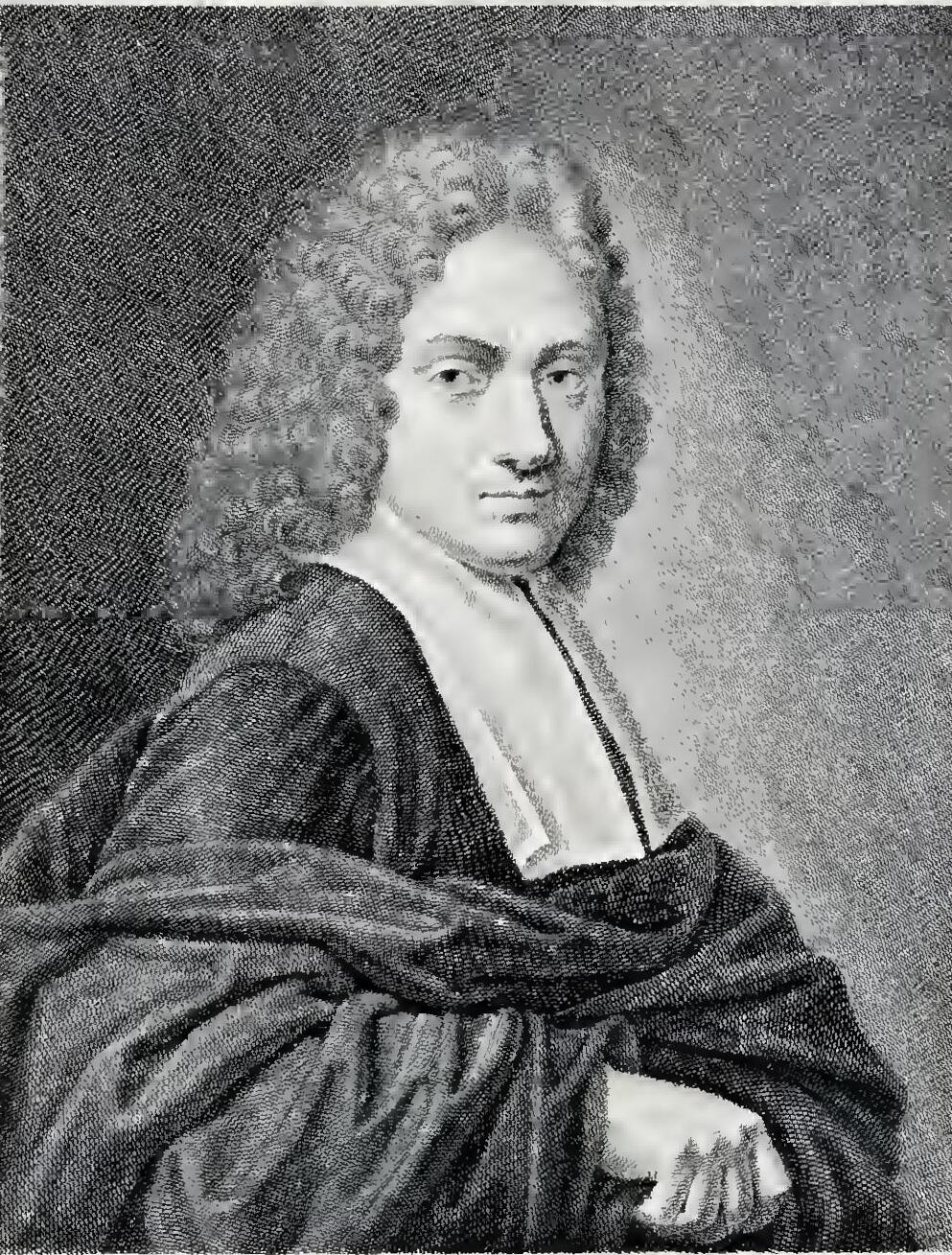
- Born: 1640
- Died: 1710 (aged 69–70)
- Occupation: Painter

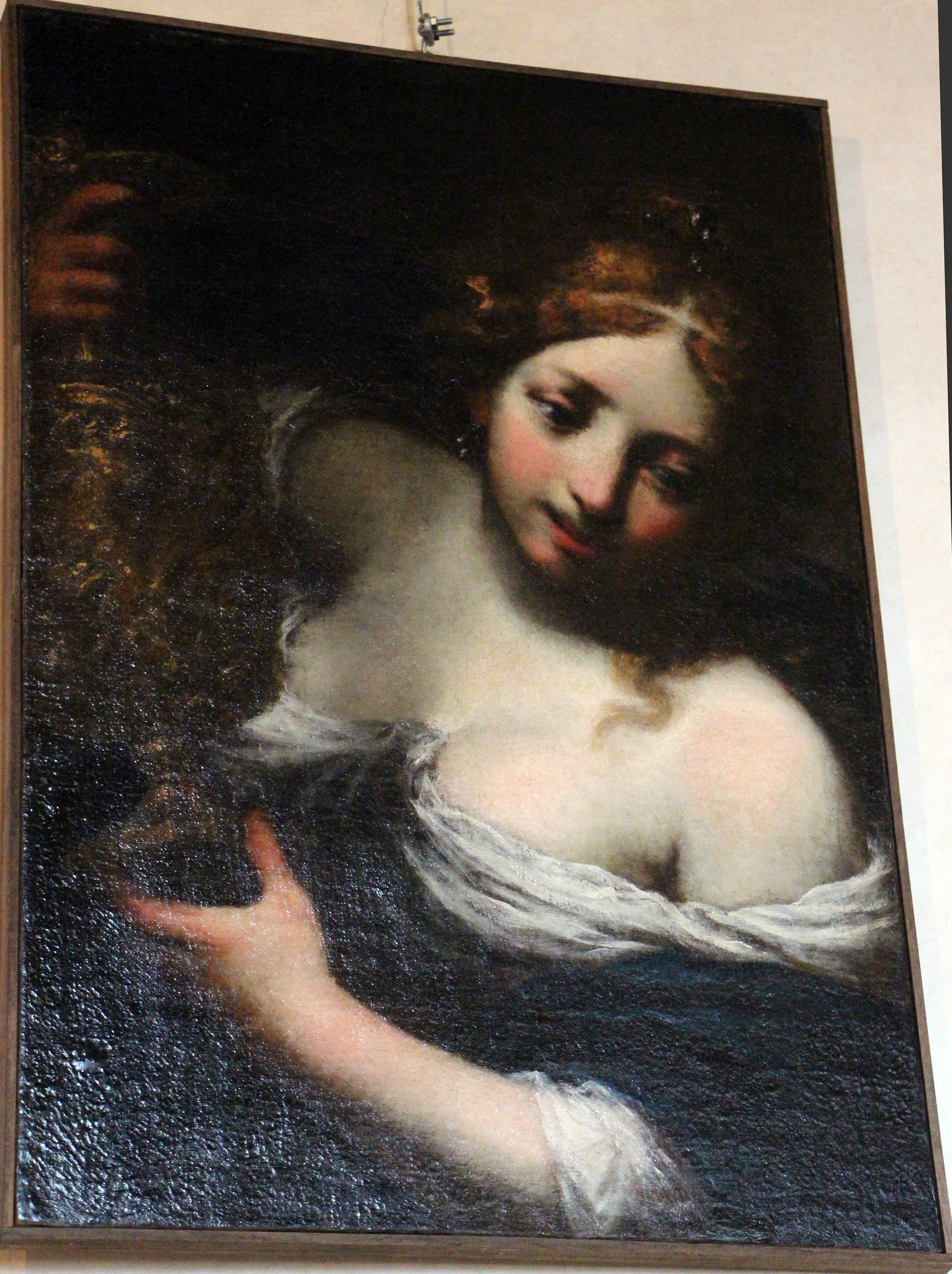
Eve

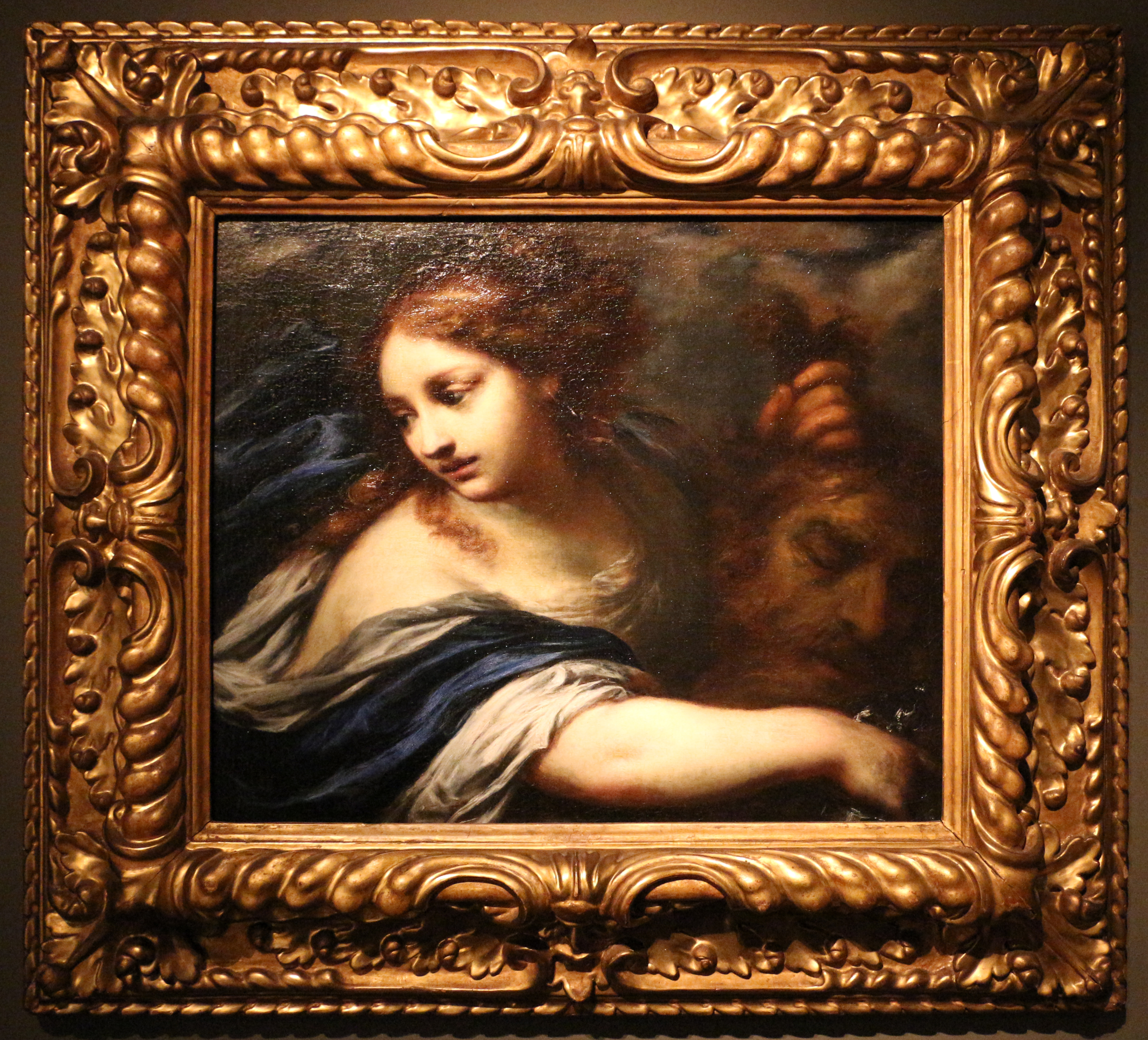
Judith and Holofernes

Francesco Botti (1640–1711) was an Italian painter of the Baroque period, active in his native Florence.

== Biography ==
His father, Giovanni was also a painter. Like his mentor Simone Pignoni, he specialized in depicting persons or scenes from classical mythology or the bible, depicting the women in seductive poses. Among his paintings are:

- Diana and Acteon
- Sophonisbae, Museo Civico di Montepulciano
- Judgement of Paris
- Allegory of Geometry, Museo di Beaux Arts of Arras
- Saints of the Augustinian Order for Santa Maria dei Candeli
- Self-portrait in the Uffizi
- Story of Santa Rosalia, Museo della Fondazione Primo Conti in Fiesole
- A Nativity and an Ecstasy of Ste Margherita, Cappella Corsini in Santo Spirito, Florence

Among his pupils was Matteo Bonechi.

== Bibliography ==
- Sandro Bellesi, Inediti di Simone Pignoni e Francesco Botti in Arte, collezionismo, conservazione: scritti in onore di Marco Chiarini.
- Francesca Baldassarri, La Pittura del Seicento a Firenze, Robilant-Voena, Torino 2009
