= Colomba =

Colomba may refer to:

- Colomba, Quetzaltenango, a municipality in Guatemala
- Colomba (surname)
- Colomba Fofana (born 1977), French triple jumper
- Colomba Gabriel (1858–1926), Ukrainian Roman Catholic professed religious and founder of the Benedictine Sisters of Charity
- "Colomba" (novella), a short story by Prosper Mérimée first published in 1840
- Colomba (1918 film), a German silent film
- Colomba (1933 film), a French film directed by Jacques Séverac
- Colomba (1948 film), a French film directed by Émile Couzinet
- Colomba, an opera by Alexander MacKenzie
- Colomba pasquale or Colomba di pasqua, an Italian traditional Easter bread

== See also ==
- Santa Colomba (disambiguation)
- Columba (disambiguation)
