= Master of Badia a Isola =

Italian painter

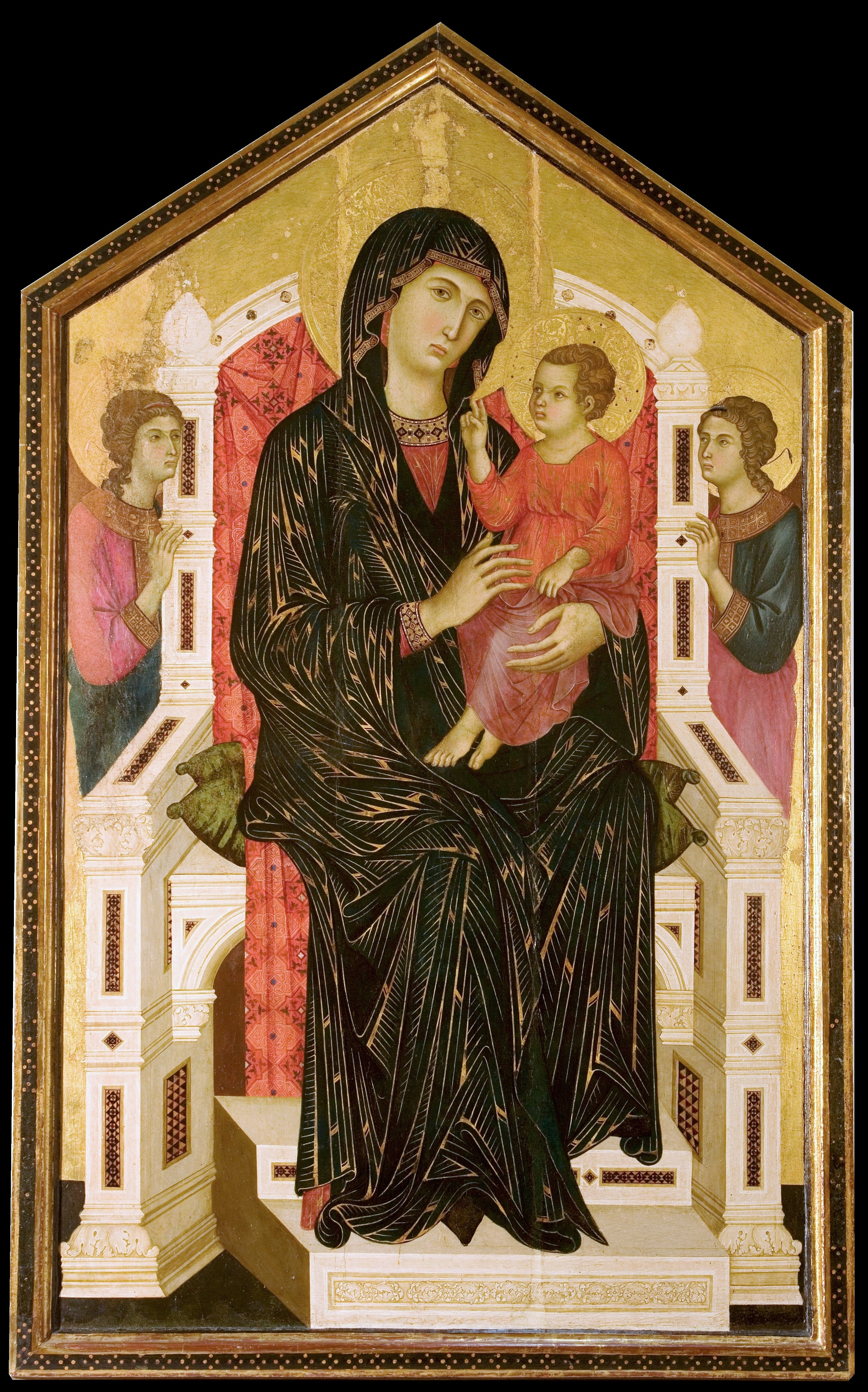
Madonna with Child and Angels, c. 1300

The Master of Badia a Isola was an Italian painter. His name is taken from a depiction of the Madonna and Child that hangs in the Badia dei Santi Salvatore e Cirino in Abbadia a Isola, located near Monteriggioni, a commune in The Province of Siena; a number of other paintings by his hand are also believed to exist.
