= Tognazzi =

Tognazzi is an Italian surname derived from the given name Antonio. Notable people with the surname include:

- Gianmarco Tognazzi (born 1967), Italian actor
- Maria Sole Tognazzi (born 1971), Italian film director
- Ricky Tognazzi (born 1955), Italian actor and film director
- Ugo Tognazzi (1922–1990), Italian film, television, and theater actor, director, and screenwriter

== See also ==
- Carlos Antognazzi
- Luca Tognozzi
- Tognazza
- Tognazzini (name)
