= Santa Colomba =

Santa Colomba may refer to:

- Santa Colomba, Bientina, a village in Tuscany, Italy
- Santa Colomba, Monteriggioni, a village in Tuscany, Italy
  - Villa Santa Colomba, Santa Colomba, Monetriggioni
- Stadio Santa Colomba, former name of Stadio Ciro Vigorito, a multi-use stadium in Benevento, Italy

== See also ==
- Santa Colomba de Curueño, a municipality in the province of León, Castile and León, Spain
- Santa Colomba de las Monjas, a municipality in the province of Zamora, Castile and León, Spain
- Santa Cristina de la Polvorosa, a municipality in the province of Zamora, Castile and León, Spain
- Santa Colomba de Somoza, a municipality in the province of León, Castile and León, Spain
