= Alessandro Girolamo Sozzini =

Italian author (1518–1608)

Alessandro Girolamo Sozzini (1518-1608) was an Italian author, eyewitness of the Siena revolt and the capture, at the end of August 1554, of the Sienese fortress of Monteriggioni by Spanish and Florentine Imperial troops. He left an account Diario delle cose avvenute in Siena: dai 20 Luglio 1550 ai 28 Guigno 1555 which was republished in 1842. His "Raccolta di burle, facetie, motti e buffonerie di tre huomini sanesi" was republished in 1865.
