= Antognazza =

Antognazza is an Italian surname. Notable people with the surname include:

- Emiliano Albín Antognazza (born 1989), Uruguayan footballer
- Maria Rosa Antognazza (born 1964), English professor of philosophy

== See also ==
- Carlos Antognazzi
