= Tognazzini =

Tognazzini is an Italian surname derived from the given name Antonio. Notable people with the surname include:

- Anthony Tognazzini (born 1969), American writer
- Bruce Tognazzini (born 1945), American consultant and designer

== See also ==
- Tognazza
- Tognazzi
