= Marocchinate =

Mass rape and killings committed following the Battle of Monte Cassino

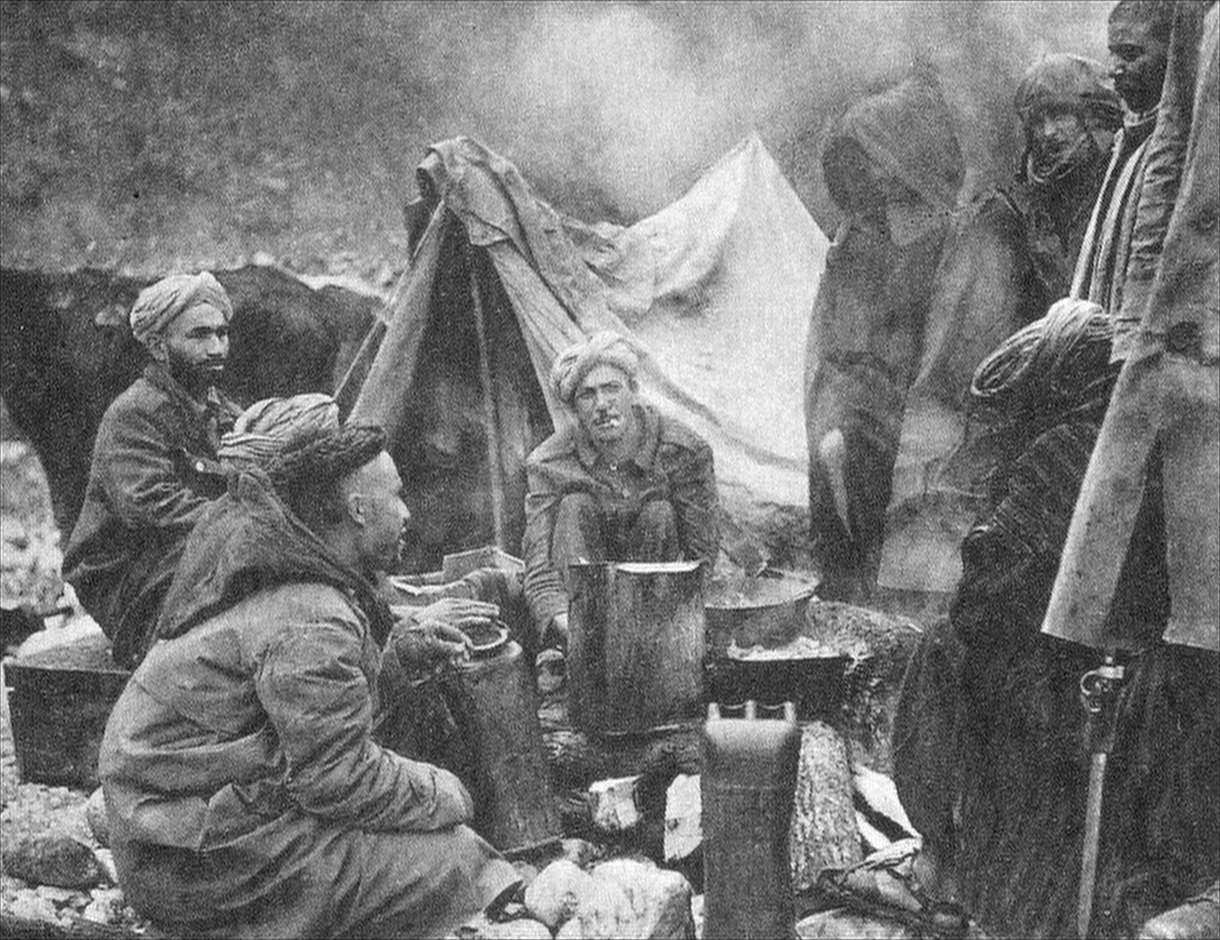
Moroccan soldiers at Monte Cassino, January 1944.

Marocchinate (Italian for 'Moroccans' deeds', pronounced [marokkiˈnaːte]) refers to the mass rapes and killings committed during World War II after the Battle of Monte Cassino in Italy. These atrocities were mostly committed by the Moroccan Goumiers, colonial troops of the French Expeditionary Corps (FEC), commanded by General Alphonse Juin, and mostly targeted civilian women and girls (as well as a few men and boys) in the rural areas of Southern Lazio, between Naples and Rome – a region popularly known as Ciociaria. Mass rapes continued across the entire campaign northward, including in several locations in Tuscany: Siena, Abbadia S. Salvatore, Radicofani, Murlo, Strove, Poggibonsi, Elsa, S. Quirico d'Orcia, and Colle Val d'Elsa.

== Background ==
Goumiers were colonial irregular troops forming the Goums Marocains, which were approximately company-sized units rather loosely grouped in Tabors (battalions) and Groupes (regiments). Three of the units, the 1st, 3rd and 4th Groupements de Tabors, served in the FEC along with the four regular divisions: the 1st Free French Division, the 2nd Moroccan Infantry Division, the 3rd Algerian Infantry Division and the 4th Moroccan Mountain Division. The Goums Marocains were commanded by General Augustin Guillaume.

Regular Moroccan troops (tirailleurs marocains) also served in Italy but under tighter discipline and with a higher proportion of officers than the irregular goumiers.

On 14 May 1944 the Goumiers travelled over seemingly impassable terrain in the Aurunci Mountains, outflanked the German defence in the adjacent Liri valley, materially assisting the British XIII Corps of the Eighth Army, to break the Gustav Line and advance to the next defensive position, the Hitler Line.

General Alphonse Juin was alleged to have said before the battle: "For fifty hours you will be the absolute masters of what you will find beyond the enemy. Nobody will punish you for what you will do, nobody will ask you about what you will get up to." While there is no evidence of any such statement by General Juin, in 2007 Baris Tomaso justified it by claiming it was linked to the perception of the crimes by the Italians rather than an official policy of the French Army.

Through the end of 1944 the Italian government showed interest and preoccupation for the violence and gathered information about the victims. By December 1948 there were 10,000 cases submitted to Italian authorities but funds were scarce because of war indemnities Italy had to pay to France and this issue was an obstacle on the restoration of diplomatic relations with France. For these reasons many demands were rejected and the victims had to prove permanent physical damage.

== Mass rape ==
Monte Cassino was captured by the Allies on 18 May 1944. The next night, thousands of Goumiers and other French colonial troops scoured the villages of Southern Latium. Italian victims' associations such as Associazione Nazionale Vittime delle Marocchinate alleged that 12,000 women, ranging in age from 11 to 86, suffered from violence, when village after village came under control of the Goumiers. Estimates made by the Italian Ministry of Defence in 1997 set the figure at 2,000 to 3,000 female victims. The number of men killed has been estimated at 800. The number of children born as a result of the Marocchinate is hard to estimate.

The mayor of Esperia, a comune in the Province of Frosinone, reported that in his town, 700 women out of 2,500 inhabitants were raped, resulting in many deaths. According to Italian victims associations, a total of more than 7,000 civilians, including children, were raped by Goumiers. Baris considers the figure of twelve thousand women raped provided by the Communist women's organization Unione Donne Italiane to be credible; this is in contrast to later estimates of two thousand women.

=== Testimonials of mass rape in Lazio ===
The writer Norman Lewis, at the time a British officer on the Monte Cassino front, narrated the events:

The French colonial troops are on the rampage again. Whenever they take a town or a village, a wholesale rape of the population takes place. Recently all females in the villages of Patricia, Pofi, Isoletta, Supino, and Morolo were violated. In Lenola, which fell to the Allies on May 21, fifty women were raped, but – as these were not enough to go round – children and even old men were violated. It is reported to be normal for two Moroccans to assault a woman simultaneously, one having normal intercourse while the other commits sodomy. In many cases severe damage to the genitals, rectum and uterus has been caused. In Castro di Volsci doctors treated 300 victims of rape, and at Ceccano the British have been forced to build a guarded camp to protect the Italian women.

— Norman Lewis, Naples '44

"In S. Andrea, the Moroccans raped 30 women and two men; in Vallemaio two sisters had to satisfy a platoon of 200 goumiers; 300 of these, on the other hand, abused a sixty-year-old. In Esperia, 700 women were raped out of a population of 2,500 inhabitants, with 400 complaints presented. Even the parish priest, Don Alberto Terrilli, in an attempt to defend two girls, was tied to a tree and raped for a whole night. He died two days later from internal lacerations reported. In Pico, a girl was crucified with her sister. After the gang violence, she will be killed. Polleca reached the pinnacle of bestiality. Luciano Garibaldi writes that from the Moroccan departments of the gen. Guillaume girls and old women were raped; the men who reacted were sodomized, shot dead, emasculated or impaled alive. A testimony, from a report of the time, describes their typical modality: "The Moroccan soldiers who had knocked on the door and which was not opened, knocked down the door itself, hit the fortress with the butt of the musket to the head making it fall to the ground unconscious, then she was carried about 30 meters from the house and raped while her father, by other soldiers, was dragged, beaten and tied to a tree. The terrified bystanders could not bring any help to the girl and the parent as a soldier remained on guard with a musket aimed at them."

=== Involvement of non-commissioned officers and European officers ===
Given the involvement of non-commissioned officers and white officers, some of them Italian-speaking as Corsican, not present in the Goumier troop departments, it can be said that the rapists nestled in all four divisions of the CEF. Perhaps also for this reason, the French officers did not respond to any solicitation from the victims and watched impassively at the work of their men. As the testimonies report, when civilians showed up to report the violence, the officers shrugged their shoulders and dismissed them with a smirk.

— Baris Tommaso

=== Testimonials of mass rape in Tuscany ===
This attitude persisted until the arrival of the CEF in Tuscany. Here the violence began again in Siena, in Abbadia S. Salvatore, Radicofani, Murlo, Strove, Poggibonsi, Elsa, S. Quirico d'Orcia, Colle Val d'Elsa. Even members of the Italian Resistance suffered abuse.

In Abbadia we counted as many as sixty victims of grim violence, which took place under the eyes of their families. One of the victims was comrade Lidia, our relay. Comrade Paolo, approached with an excuse, was also raped by seven Moroccans. The French commands, to our protests, replied that it was the tradition of their colonial troops to receive such an award after a difficult battle.

— Enzo Nizza, red partisan

=== Leaflet ===
After the war a leaflet in French and Arabic was forged with the claim that it would have been circulated among the Goumiers saying: "Soldiers! This time it is not only the freedom of your lands that I offer you if you win this battle. Behind the enemy there are women, houses, there is a wine among the best in the world, there is gold. All of this will be yours if you win. You will have to kill the Germans to the last man and pass at any cost. What I have said and promised I keep. For fifty hours you will be the absolute master of what you will find beyond the enemy. Nobody will punish you for what you do, nobody will ask you to account for what you will take."

== Legal status and aftermath ==
While the 1907 Hague Convention (IV) on Land Warfare made war rape a war crime in international armed conflicts, the judges at the Nuremberg trials in 1946 stated "the laws and customs of war apply between belligerents, but not...among allies." Such statement was reinforced by the 1949 Fourth Geneva Convention under Article 4, which excludes allied nationals from the list of protected persons as long as their state maintains diplomatic relations with a belligerent power. At the time of Marocchinate, Italy was a co-belligerent with the Allies, having declared war on its former Axis partner Nazi Germany on 13 October 1943.

As a result, the war rape of Italian women in Italy by French colonial troops fell under the purview of both French military and Italian civilian law instead of international humanitarian law. 207 soldiers were tried for sexual violence, of whom 156 were convicted. Three of those convicted were executed. Another 28 soldiers who were caught in the act were summarily executed. In January 1947, France authorized the compensation of 1,488 victims of sexual violence for crimes committed by French colonial troops.

== Cultural depictions ==
Although the popular definition of Ciociaria for some areas of Lazio is historically and geographically inappropriate, the term itself is often associated with these mass rapes. The definition was indeed forcefully imposed by the fascist regime, although it was just a popular pejorative term in the modern Roman dialect. Having been imposed by fascism in the pre-war years, it has remained associated with these mass rapes. The 1957 novel Two Women (original title La Ciociara, literally "the woman from Ciociaria") by Alberto Moravia references the Marocchinate; in it a mother and her daughter, trying to escape the fighting, are raped by Goumiers in an abandoned church. The novel was made into a movie, directed by Vittorio De Sica and starring Sophia Loren, for which Loren won the Academy Award for Best Actress. In Castro dei Volsci, a monument called the "Mamma Ciociara" was erected to remember all the mothers who tried in vain to defend themselves and their daughters.

== Claims of exaggeration ==
Other sources, such as French Marshal Jean de Lattre de Tassigny, claimed that such cases were isolated events exploited by German propaganda to smear allies, particularly French troops. The Goumiers became a folkloric tale and stories started to be made up to extremes, even if these very extremes are documented elsewhere. According to this source, General Juin never issued the promise of "free rein" to his Moroccan troops, nor did any other French officers.
