= Badesse =

- Frazione
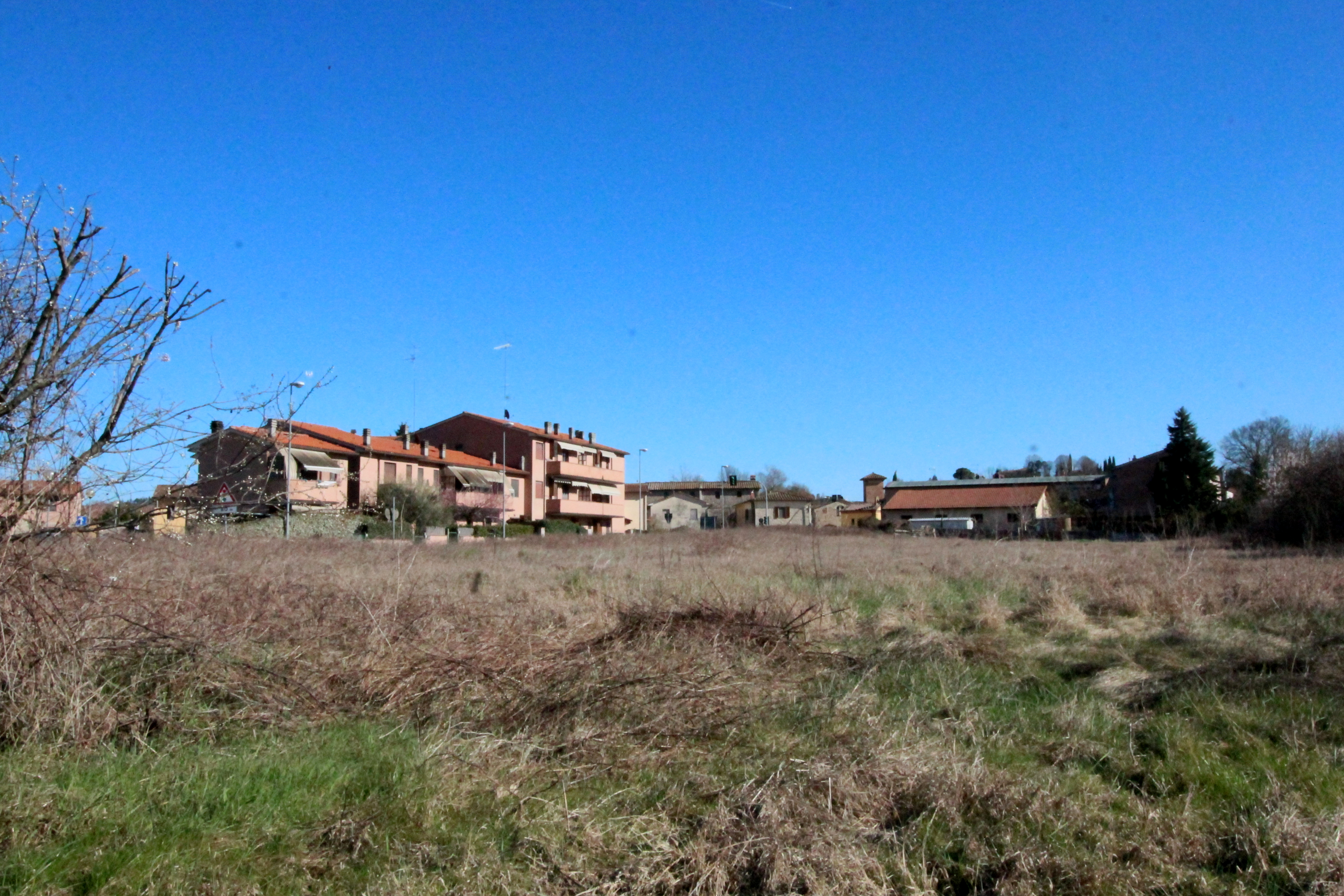

- Location of Badesse in Italy
- Coordinates: 43°22′58″N 11°16′20″E
- Country: Italy
- Region: Tuscany
- Province: Siena (SI)
- Comune: Monteriggioni
- Elevation: 226 m (741 ft)

Population (2011)
  - Total: 512
- Time zone: UTC+1 (CET)
  - Summer (DST): UTC+2 (CEST)

Badesse is a village in Tuscany, central Italy, administratively a frazione of the comune of Monteriggioni, province of Siena. At the time of the 2001 census its population was 454.

Badesse is about 13 kilometres (8.1 mi) from Siena and 8 kilometres (5.0 mi) from Monteriggioni.
