= Basciano, Monteriggioni =

Basciano
- Frazione
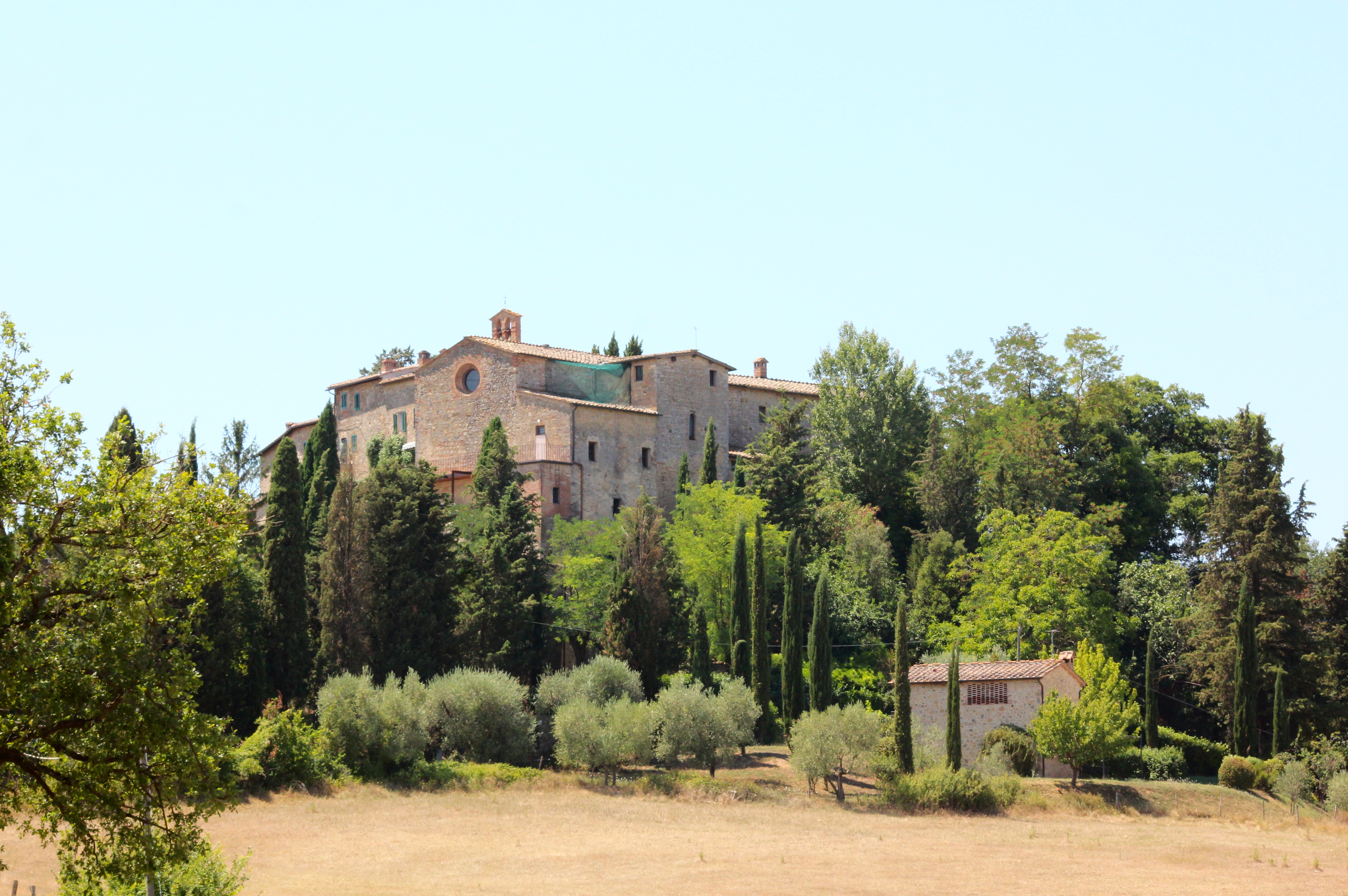

- Location of Basciano in Italy
- Coordinates: 43°22′16″N 11°17′45″E
- Country: Italy
- Region: Tuscany
- Province: Siena (SI)
- Comune: Monteriggioni
- Elevation: 328 m (1,076 ft)

Population (2011)
  - Total: 73
- Time zone: UTC+1 (CET)
  - Summer (DST): UTC+2 (CEST)

Basciano is a village in Tuscany, central Italy, administratively a frazione of the comune of Monteriggioni, province of Siena. At the time of the 2001 census its population was 49.

Basciano is about 13 km from Siena and 10 km from Monteriggioni.
