= Uopini =

- Frazione
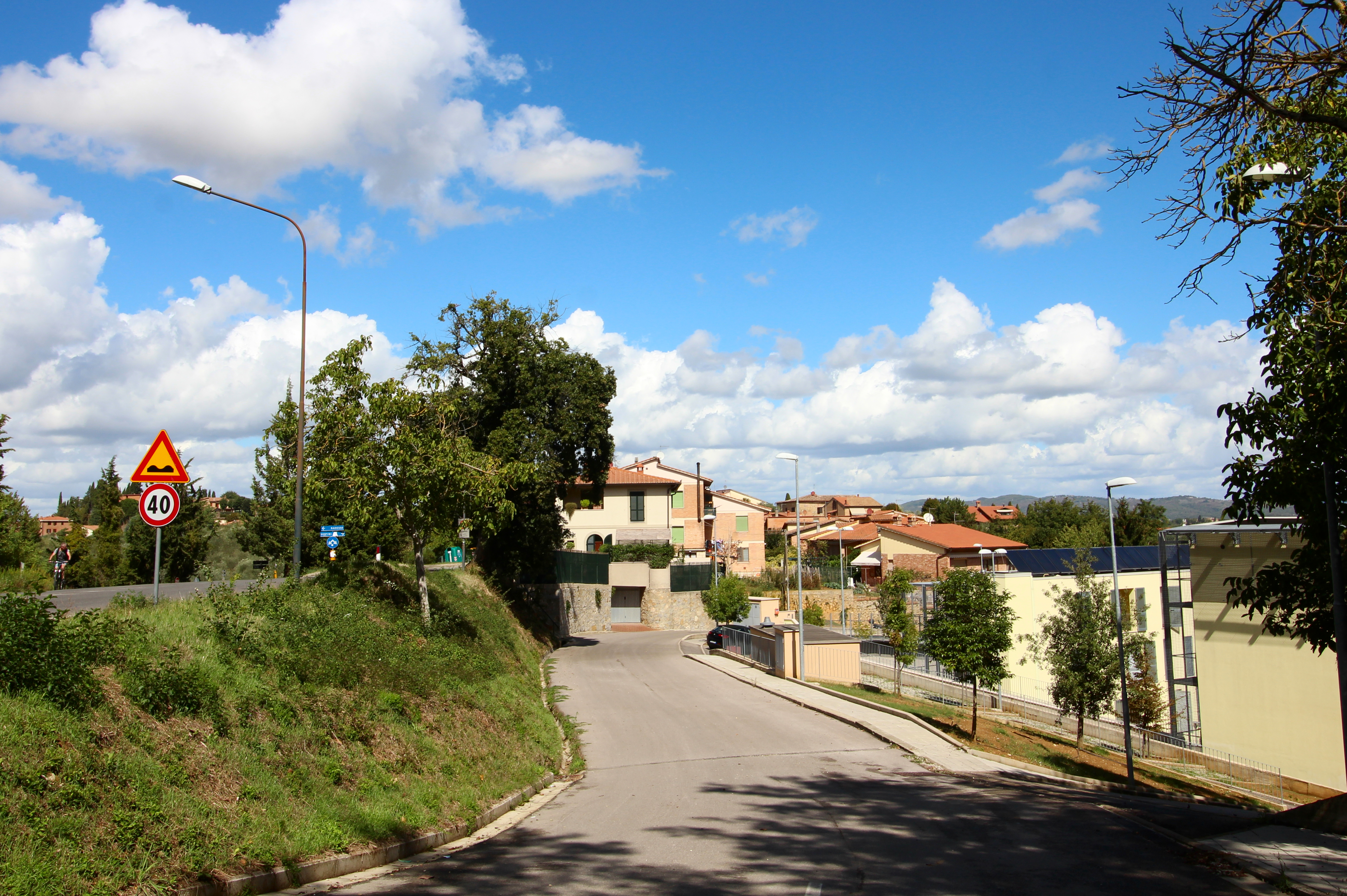

- Location of Uopini in Italy
- Coordinates: 43°21′9″N 11°17′46″E
- Country: Italy
- Region: Tuscany
- Province: Siena (SI)
- Comune: Monteriggioni
- Elevation: 352 m (1,155 ft)

Population (2011)
  - Total: 471
- Time zone: UTC+1 (CET)
  - Summer (DST): UTC+2 (CEST)

Uopini (Italian pronunciation /ˈwɔpini/)is a village in Tuscany, central Italy, administratively a frazione of the comune of Monteriggioni, province of Siena. At the time of the 2001 census, its population was 508.

Uopini is about 10 km from Siena and from Monteriggioni.
