= Montarioso =

- Frazione
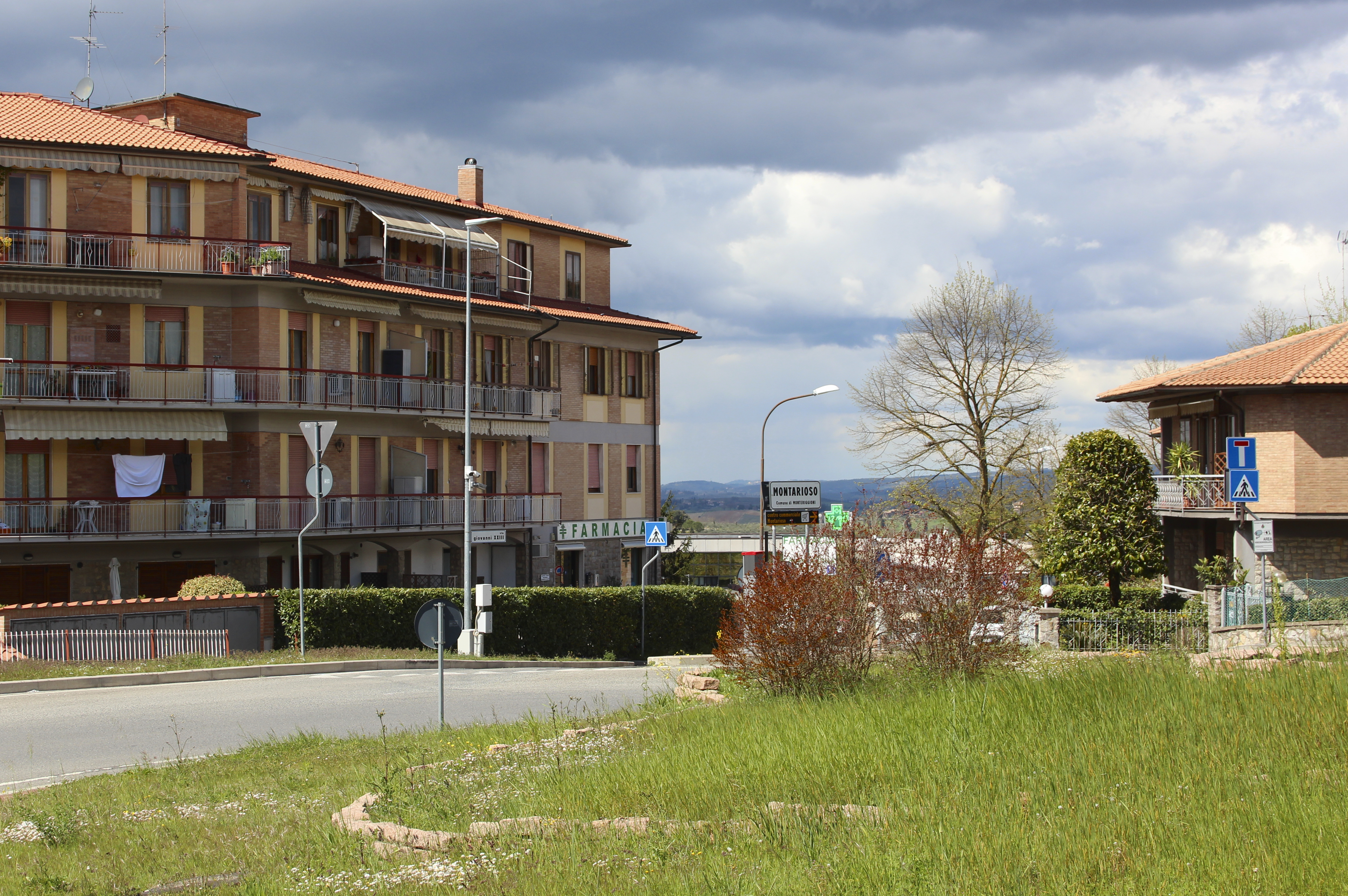

- Location of Montarioso in Italy
- Coordinates: 43°20′59″N 11°18′35″E
- Country: Italy
- Region: Tuscany
- Province: Siena (SI)
- Comune: Monteriggioni
- Elevation: 354 m (1,161 ft)
- Time zone: UTC+1 (CET)
  - Summer (DST): UTC+2 (CEST)

Montarioso is a province in Tuscany, central Italy, administratively a frazione of the comune of Monteriggioni, province of Siena.

Montarioso is about 5 km from Siena and 13 km from Monteriggioni. Montarioso is often still known today as a part of Belverde.

Transportation is available to Montarioso serviced by Autolinee Toscane

== Mains sights ==
- Santa Maria Maddalena a Santonovo (12th century)
