= San Leonardo al Lago, Monteriggioni =

Coordinates: 43.320169°N 11.249017°E

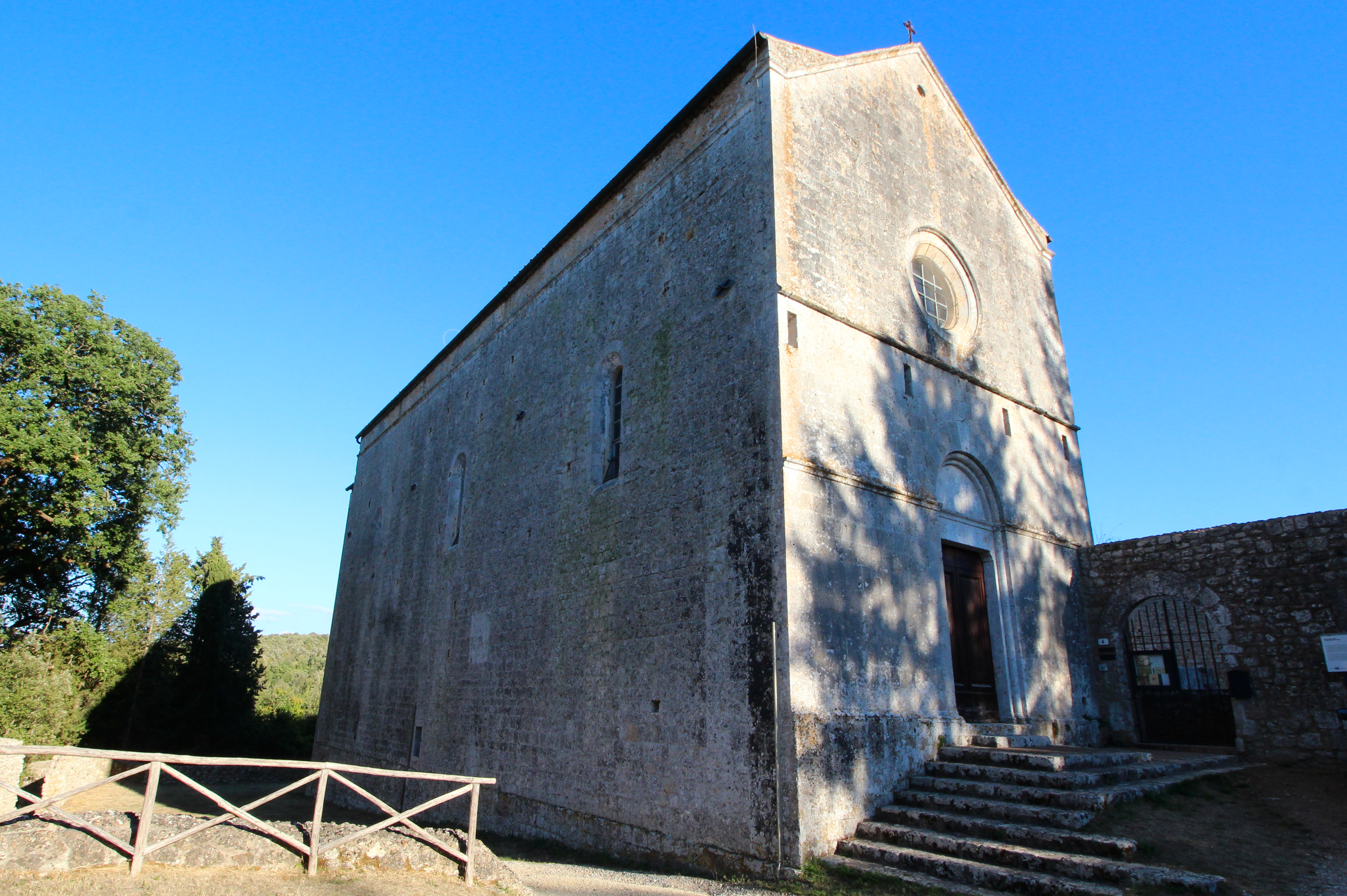
Exterior of the Church

San Leonardo al Lago is a Roman Catholic church in the neighborhood of Santa Colomba, within the municipal limits of Monteriggioni, a few kilometers outside of Siena, region of Tuscany, Italy.

== History ==
The church was originally documented as an Augustinian hermitage in 1119, located near the Lake Verano, now known a Pian del Lago. An abbey was established over the next centuries. The church underwent reconstruction during 13th and 14th centuries, gaining a style transitioning between romanesque and gothic. In 1366, the convent was fortified to protect against raiding armies. The tall stone facade has a round oculus but a rounded arch portal. The lateral walls have few but narrow windows.

The church apse contains frescoes depicting the Life of the Virgin (1360-1370) by Lippo Vanni. The refectory contains remains of a fresco depicting the Crucifixion (1445) by Giovanni di Paolo del Grazia.
