= San Martino, Monteriggioni =

San Martino
- Frazione
- Location of San Martino in Italy
- Coordinates: 43°20′48″N 11°16′52″E
- Country: Italy
- Region: Tuscany
- Province: Siena (SI)
- Comune: Monteriggioni; Siena (partial)
- Elevation: 353 m (1,158 ft)

Population (2001)
  - Total: 399
- Time zone: UTC+1 (CET)
  - Summer (DST): UTC+2 (CEST)

San Martino is a village in Tuscany, central Italy, administratively a frazione of the comune of Monteriggioni, province of Siena. At the time of the 2001 census its population was 399.

San Martino is about 10 km from Siena and 9 km from Monteriggioni.
