= Belverde =

- Frazione
- Location of Belverde in Italy
- Coordinates: 43°20′51″N 11°18′15″E
- Country: Italy
- Region: Tuscany
- Province: Siena (SI)
- Comune: Monteriggioni
- Elevation: 358 m (1,175 ft)

Population (2011)
  - Total: 1,189
- Time zone: UTC+1 (CET)
  - Summer (DST): UTC+2 (CEST)

Belverde is a village in Tuscany, central Italy, administratively a frazione of the comune of Monteriggioni, province of Siena. At the time of the 2001 census its population was 1,272.

Belverde is about 5 km from Siena and 13 km from Monteriggioni.
