= Castellina Scalo =

- Frazione
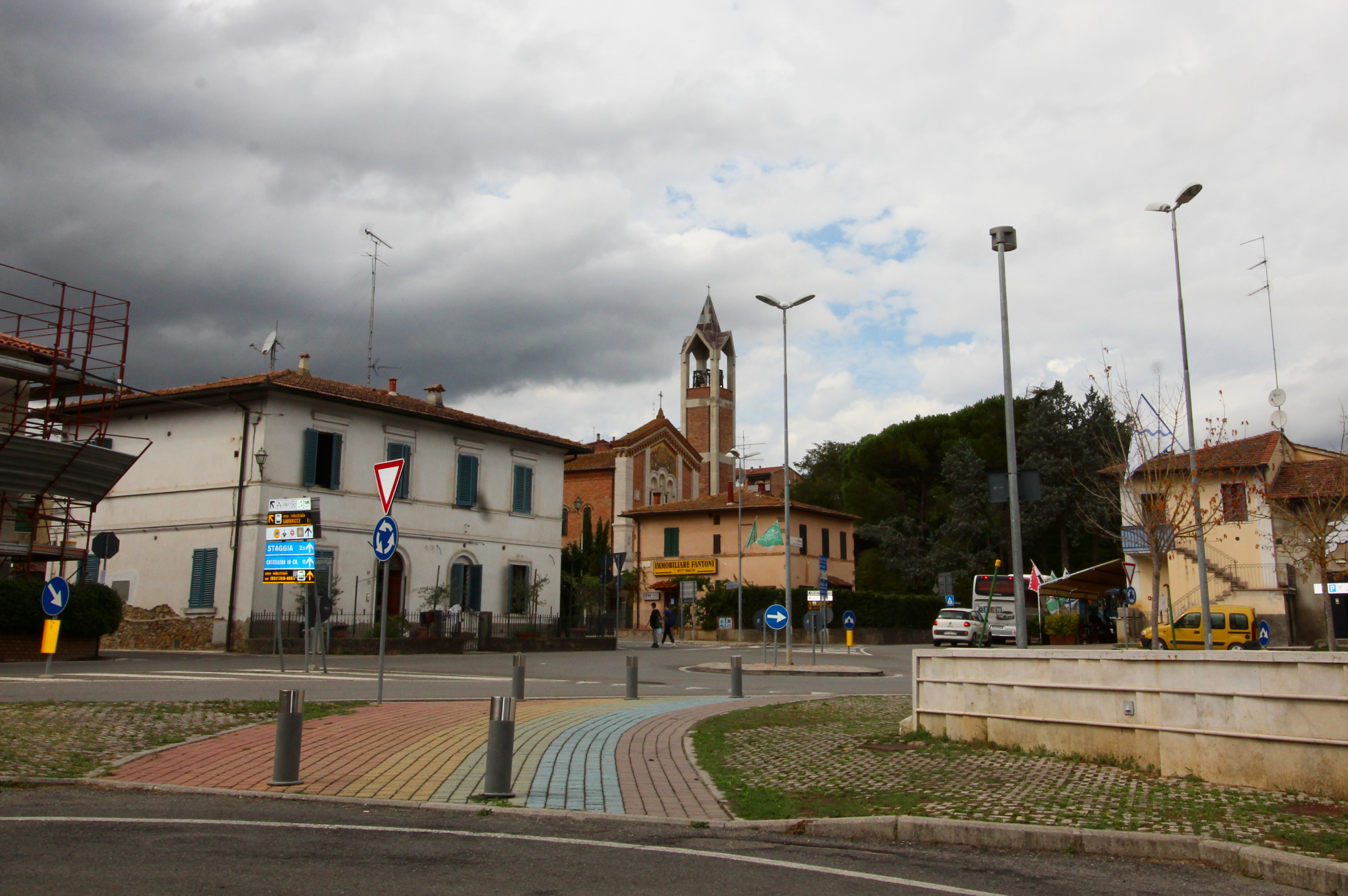

- Location of Castellina Scalo in Italy
- Coordinates: 43°24′17″N 11°12′32″E
- Country: Italy
- Region: Tuscany
- Province: Siena (SI)
- Comune: Monteriggioni
- Elevation: 192 m (630 ft)

Population (2011)
  - Total: 2,437
- Time zone: UTC+1 (CET)
  - Summer (DST): UTC+2 (CEST)

Castellina Scalo is a town in Tuscany, central Italy, administratively a frazione of the comune of Monteriggioni, province of Siena. At the time of the 2001 census its population was 1,809.

Castellina Scalo is about 20 km from Siena and 4 km from Monteriggioni.
