= Lornano =

- Frazione
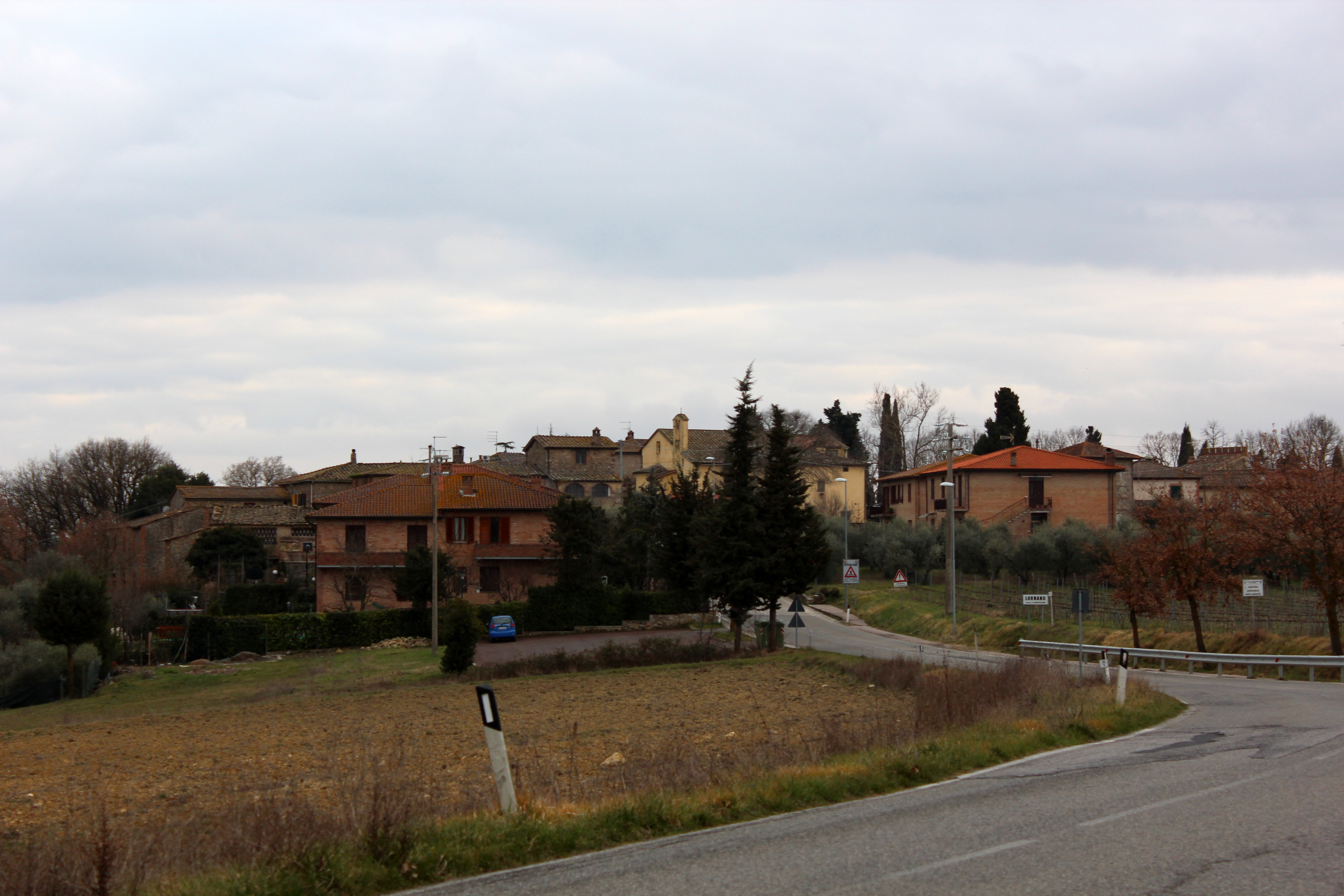

- Location of Lornano in Italy
- Coordinates: 43°23′51″N 11°16′10″E
- Country: Italy
- Region: Tuscany
- Province: Siena (SI)
- Comune: Monteriggioni
- Elevation: 300 m (980 ft)

Population (2011)
  - Total: 86
- Time zone: UTC+1 (CET)
  - Summer (DST): UTC+2 (CEST)

Lornano is a village in Tuscany, central Italy, administratively a frazione of the comune of Monteriggioni, province of Siena. At the time of the 2001 census its population was 87.

Lornano is about 15 km from Siena and 8 km from Monteriggioni.
