= Colomba (surname) =

Colomba is a surname. Notable people with the surname include:

- Davide Colomba (born 1988), Italian football player
- Elizabeth Colomba (born 1976), French painter of Martinique heritage
- Franco Colomba (born 1955), Italian football coach and former player; father of Davide Colomba
- Giovanni Battista Colomba (1638–?), Italian Baroque painter and architect
- Luca Antonio Colomba (1674–1737), Swiss Baroque painter
- Massimo Colomba (born 1977), Swiss football goalkeeper
