= Strove =

- Frazione
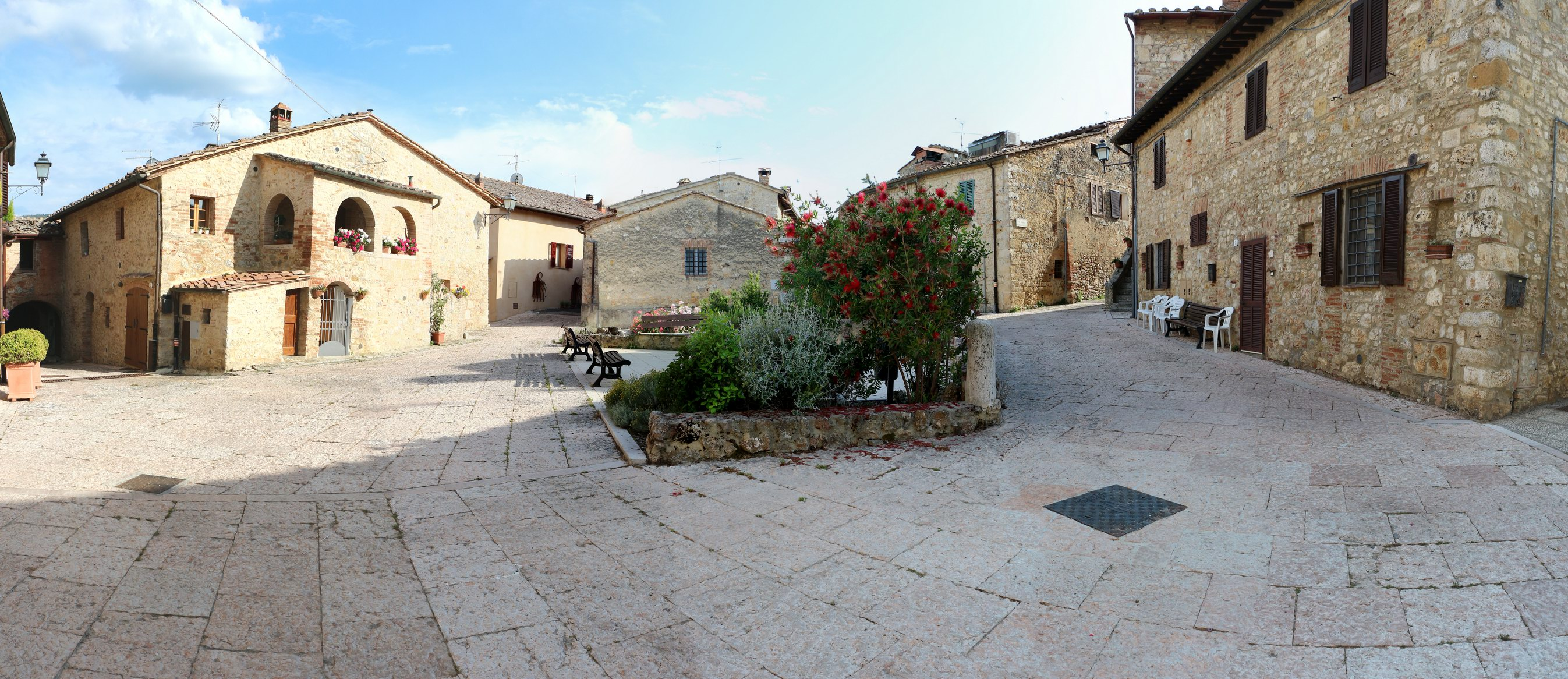

- Location of Strove in Italy
- Coordinates: 43°22′45″N 11°10′19″E
- Country: Italy
- Region: Tuscany
- Province: Siena (SI)
- Comune: Monteriggioni
- Elevation: 262 m (860 ft)

Population (2001)
  - Total: 84
- Time zone: UTC+1 (CET)
  - Summer (DST): UTC+2 (CEST)

Strove is a village in Tuscany, central Italy, administratively a frazione of the comune of Monteriggioni, province of Siena. At the time of the 2001 census its population was 84.

Strove is about 23 km from Siena and 6 km from Monteriggioni.
