= Badia of Santi Salvatore e Cirino =

Coordinates: 43.387581°N 11.195120°E

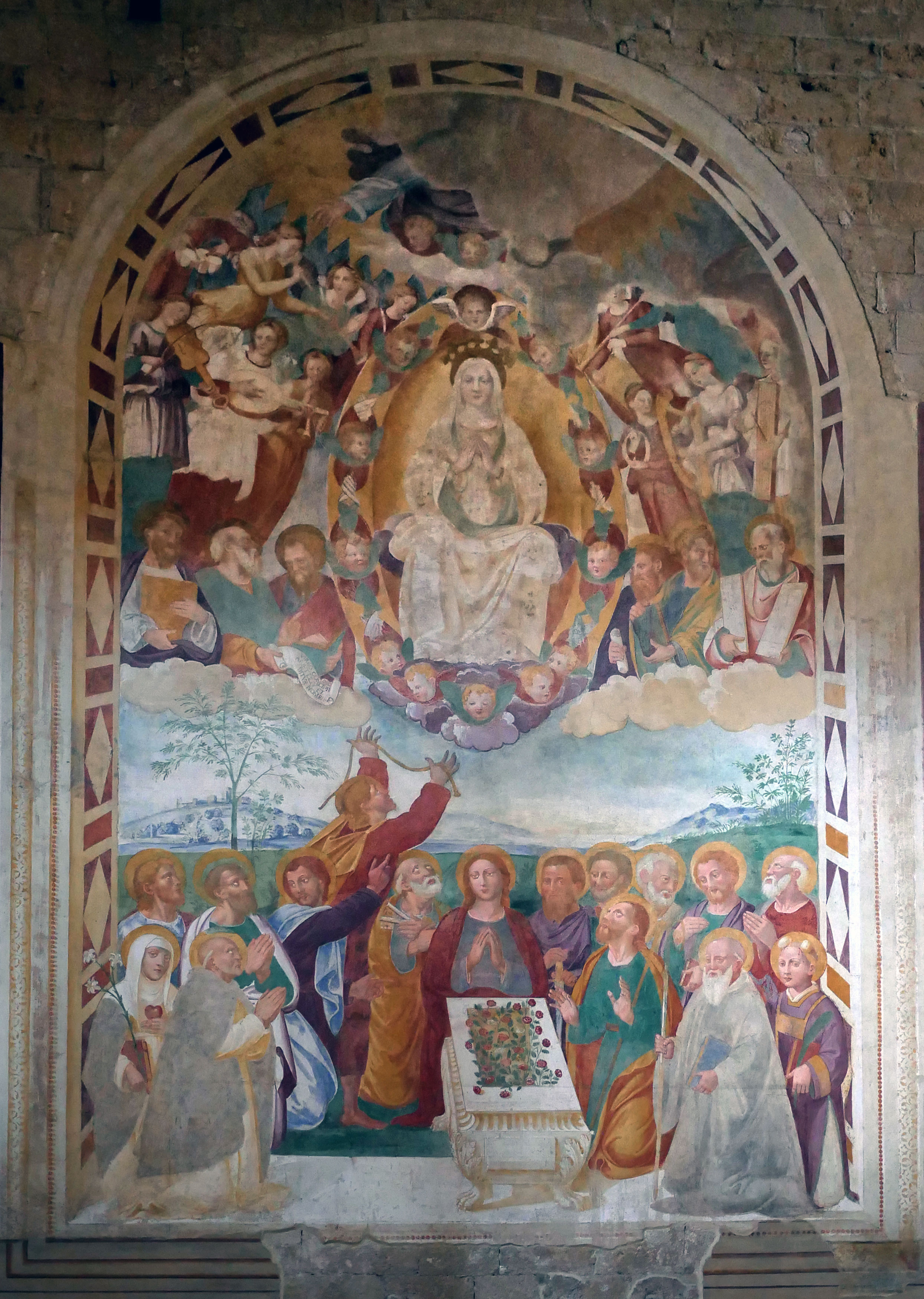
Assumption of the Virgin by Vincenzo Tamagni in the abbey church

The Badia of Santi Salvatore e Cirino or in English the Abbey of Saints Salvatore and Cirino is a former Cistercian monastery located in Abbadia a Isola, west of the village of Monteriggioni, in the province of Siena in the Italian region of Tuscany. The abbey is also known as the Badia a Isola or Abbazia dei Santi Salvatore e Cirino. The monastic buildings include an inn, restaurant and halls for cultural events.

== History ==
The abbey was founded in 1001 by a noblewoman named Ava, a member of the Lambardi di Staggia family. The place where the monastery is sited was once surrounded by water, and lay on the pilgrimage route known as Via Francigena. It served as a hospice or inn for travelers on the way to Rome. Located on the frontiers of Siena and Florence, the abbey suffered from the frequent wars. In 1446, a bull by Pope Eugenius had placed the monastery under the rule of the Monastery of Sant'Eugenio in Siena. In 1554, the site was occupied by the Florentine and Imperial forces.

Located below Mount Maggio, the Romanesque stone abbey church has three naves and three apses. The bare, partly ruinous facade has small high bifore windows. The monastery entrance still recalls it fortress-like origins. The main altarpiece is a 15th-century polyptych by Sano di Pietro.
