= Villa Santa Colomba =

The Villa Santa Colomba is a renaissance-style fortress palace structure located in the village of Santa Colomba, a frazione of Monteriggioni, a few miles outside Siena, in the region of Tuscany, Italy.

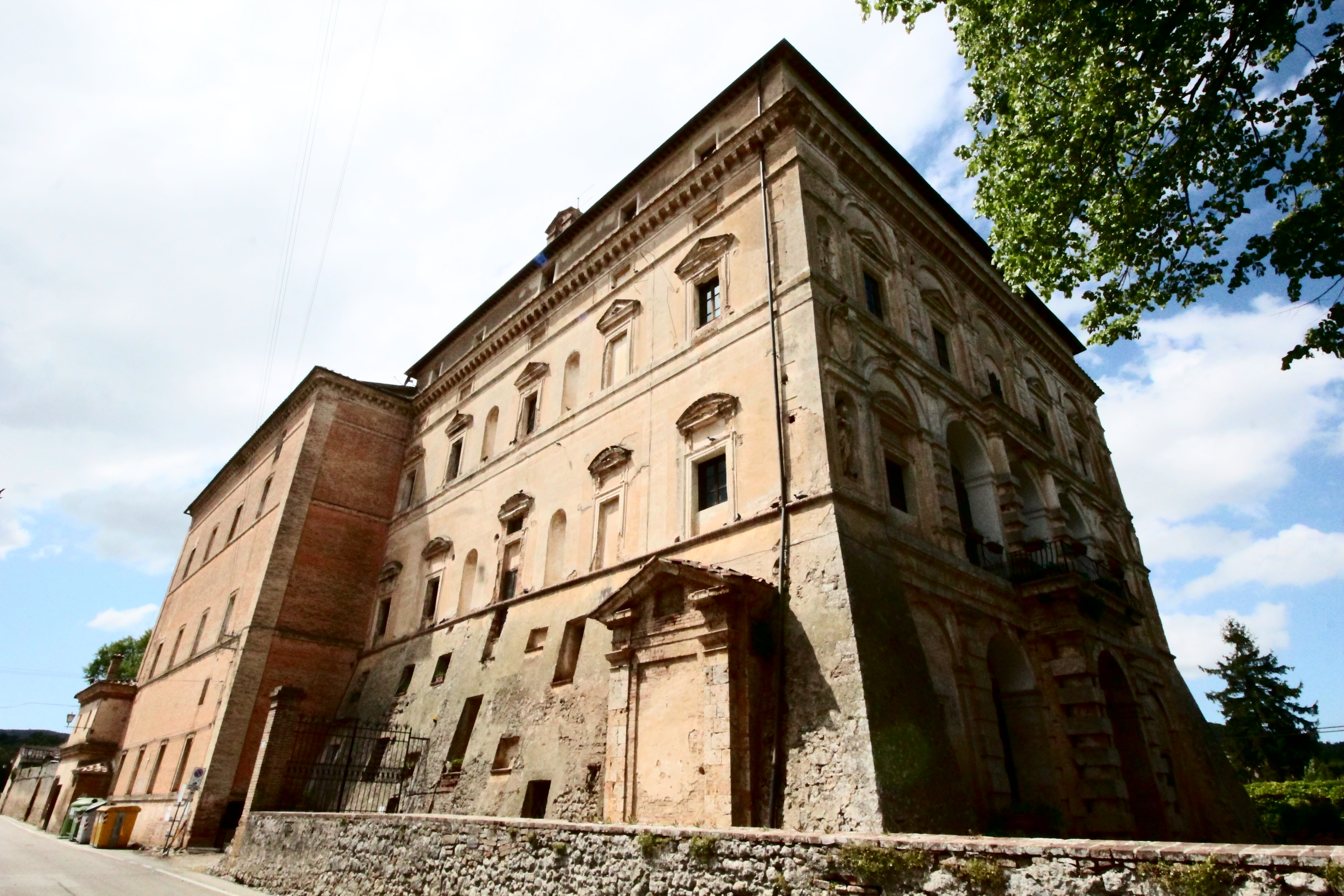

The villa was likely originally a rural castle-like structure, which during the centuries of fighting by condottieri of the nearby comunes, became less defensible. This building was severely damaged in 1364 by the raids of John Hawkwood, condottiero of Florence. All that remains of that time is the church and one of the defensive towers. In the basement are remains of some of the earlier walls.

A new villa, tall and imposing, was erected in the late 15th and early 16th century by Pandolfo Petrucci. The design has been attributed to Baldassarre Peruzzi, perhaps on a similarity of the elevated base to Villa Farnese in Caprarola. Originally the villa had extensive formal gardens. In the 1550s, during the war with the army of the Spanish Empire, the troops of the Marchese di Marignano besieged and took the villa, killing most of those taking refuge within its walls.

The villa became property of the Piccolomini of Siena until the 19th century. An inventory from 1840, noted the property belonged to the Tolomei family, and also noted four canvases by Francesco Vanni and a sculpture by Monna. The villa was frescoed by Sebastiano Folli.

The Romanesque-style stone church of Santa Colomba has a cycle of frescoes dating from the 13th to 14th centuries.
