= Abbadia a Isola =

- Frazione
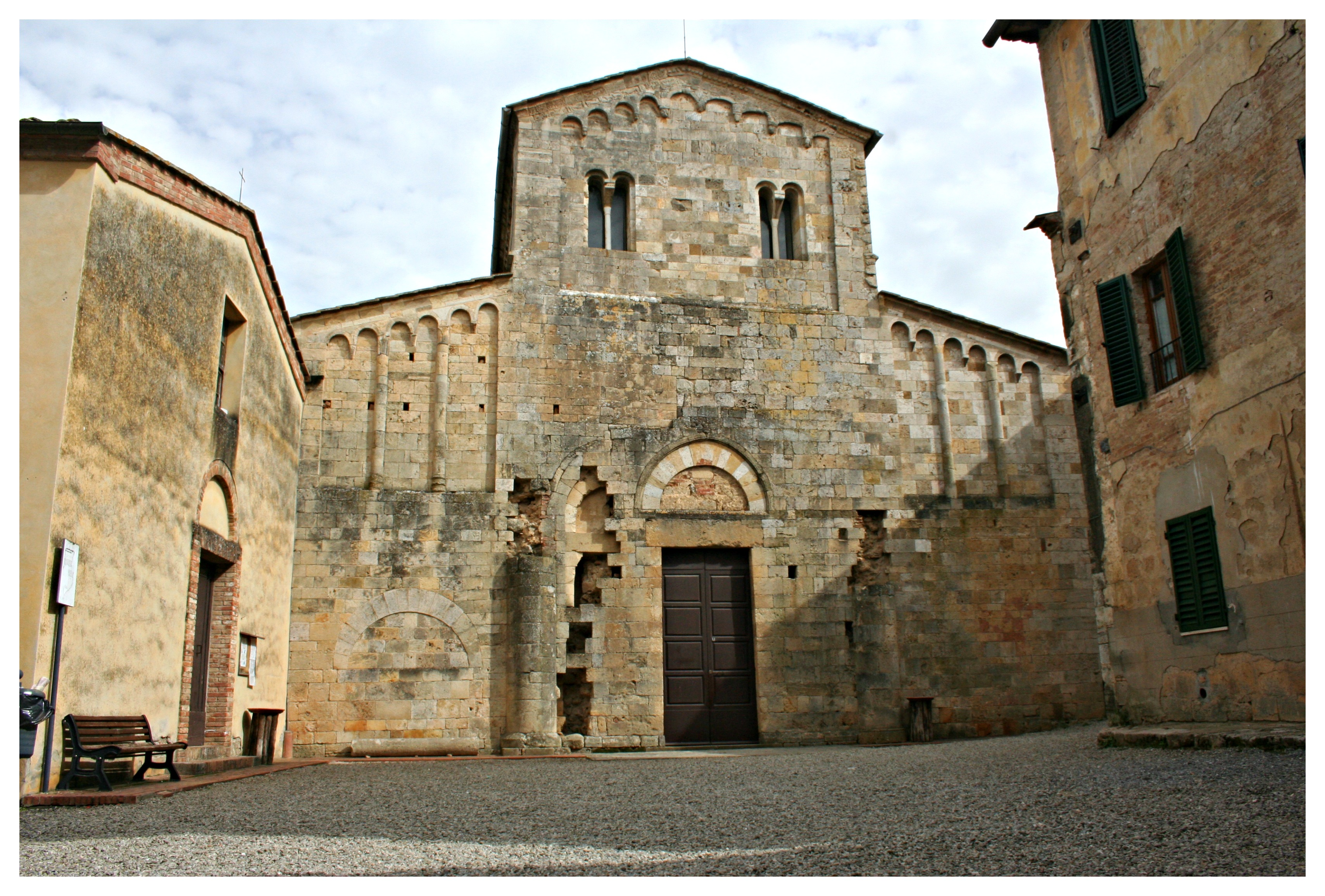
- The Abbey of Santi Salvatore e Cirino

- Location of Abbadia a Isola in Italy
- Coordinates: 43°23′21″N 11°11′42″E
- Country: Italy
- Region: Tuscany
- Province: Siena (SI)
- Comune: Monteriggioni
- Elevation: 200 m (660 ft)

Population (2011)
  - Total: 136
- Demonym: Badiani
- Time zone: UTC+1 (CET)
  - Summer (DST): UTC+2 (CEST)

Abbadia a Isola is a village in Tuscany, central Italy, administratively a frazione of the comune of Monteriggioni, province of Siena. At the time of the 2001 census its population was 136.

Abbadia a Isola is about 20 km from Siena and 4 km from Monteriggioni.

== Main sights ==
- Abbey of Santi Salvatore e Cirino
