= Santa Colomba, Monteriggioni =

Santa Colomba
- Frazione
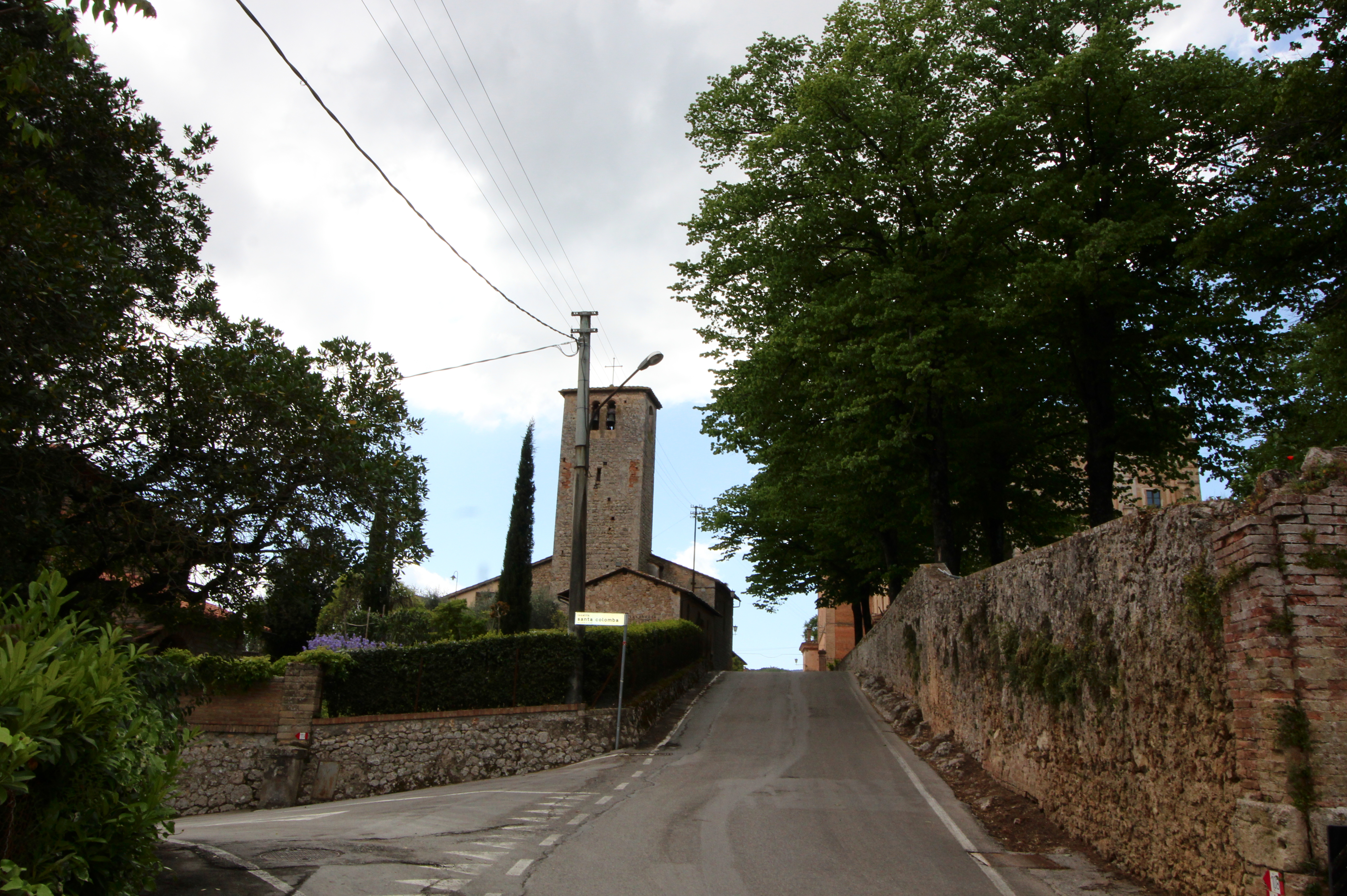

- Location of Santa Colomba in Italy
- Coordinates: 43°19′33″N 11°13′40″E
- Country: Italy
- Region: Tuscany
- Province: Siena (SI)
- Comune: Monteriggioni
- Elevation: 338 m (1,109 ft)

Population (2011)
  - Total: 54
- Time zone: UTC+1 (CET)
  - Summer (DST): UTC+2 (CEST)

Santa Colomba is a village in Tuscany, central Italy, administratively a frazione of the comune of Monteriggioni, province of Siena. At the time of the 2001 census its population was 32.

Santa Colomba is about 14 km from Siena and 12 km from Monteriggioni.

== Main sights ==
- Santi Pietro e Paolo (12th century), main parish church of the village
- Villa Santa Colomba
- Hermitage of San Giovanni al Lago
