= List of compositions by Alexander Mackenzie =

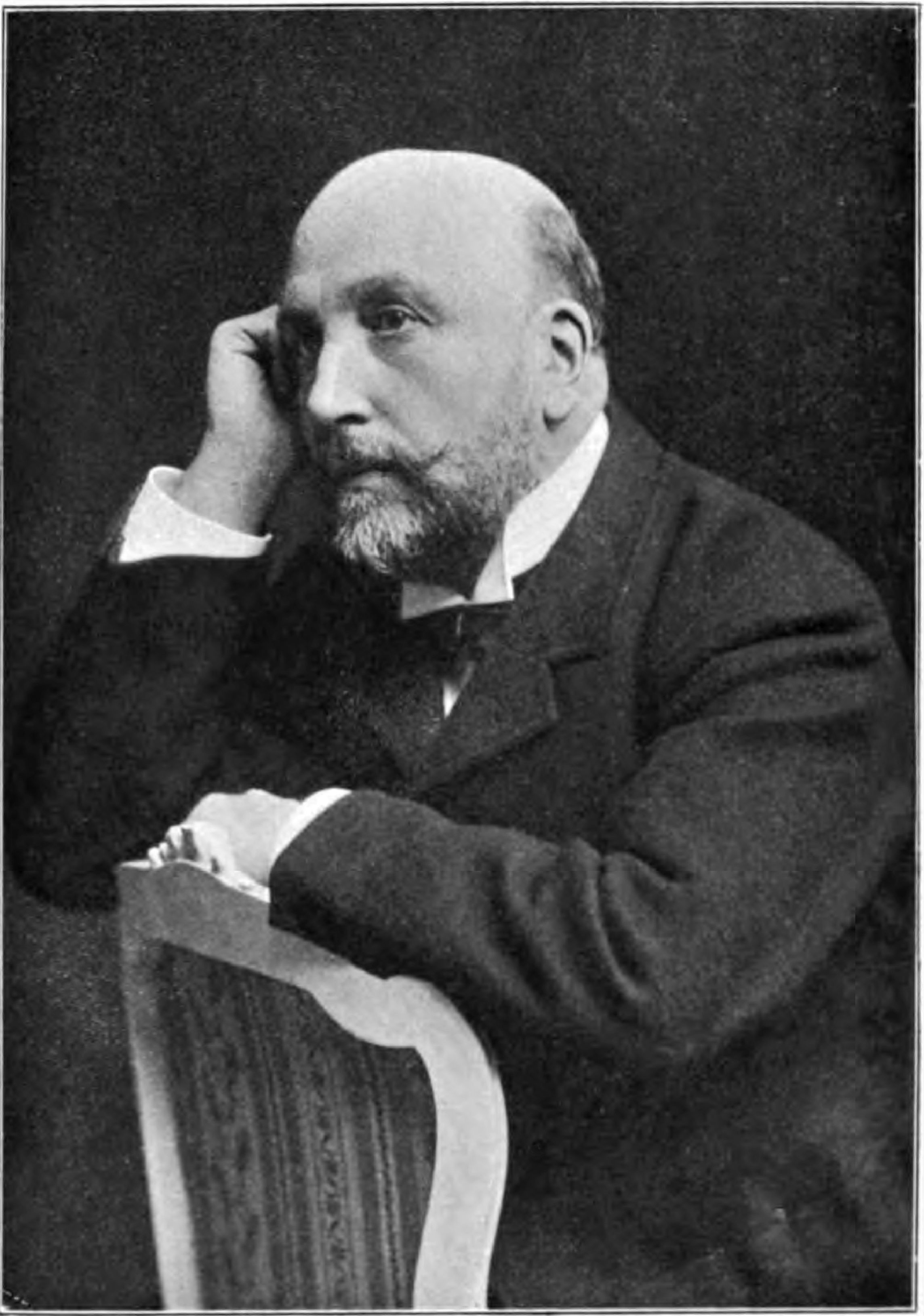
Alexander Mackenzie, 1898

Sir Alexander Mackenzie was a Scottish composer, conductor and teacher. As a composer, he is best known for his oratorios, violin and piano pieces, Scottish folk music and works for the stage. He had many successes as a composer, producing over 90 compositions. Some of his early compositions were performed as a student at the Royal Academy of Music.

He composed the following works:

Orchestral works

- 1862 – Festmarsch
- 1864 – Concert Overture
- 1869 – Overture to a Comedy
- 1876 – Cervantes, overture (fp. Sondershausen, 2 September 1877)
- 1878 – Scherzo (fp. Crystal Palace, London, 18 October 1878)
- 1879 – Rhapsodie Ecossaise, Op.21 (fp. Edinburgh Choral Union, 5 January 1880)
- 1880 – Burns [Second Scottish Rhapsody], Op.24 (fp. Glasgow, January 1881)
- 1880 – Tempo di Ballo, overture
- 1883 – La belle dame sans merci, tone poem, Op.29 (fp. Philharmonic Society, London, 9 May 1883)
- 1888 – Benedictus, for orchestra, Op.37 No.3
- 1888 – Twelfth Night, overture, Op.40 (fp. St James's Hall, London, 4 June 1888)
- 1894 – Britannia, nautical overture, Op.52 (fp. Royal Academy of Music, London, 17 May 1894)
- 1894 – From the North: Three Scottish Pieces for Orchestra, Op.53 (fp. Philharmonic Society, London, 3 April 1895)
- 1902 – Coronation March, Op.63 (fp. Alhambra Theatre, London, 13 May 1902)
- 1902 – London Day by Day, suite, Op.64 (fp. Norwich Festival, 22 October 1902)
- 1904 – Canadian Rhapsody, Op.67 (fp. Philharmonic Society, London, 15 March 1905)
- 1910 – La Savannah, air de ballet, Op.72 (fp. Bournemouth, 6 April 1911)
- 1911 – Tam o’Shanter [Third Scottish Rhapsody], Op.74 (fp. Queen's Hall, London, 20 May 1911)
- 1911 – An English Joy-Peal, Op.75 (fp. Westminster Abbey, London, 22 June 1911)
- 1911 – Invocation, Op.76 (fp. Philharmonic Society, London, 21 March 1912)
- 1915 – Ancient Scots Tunes, Op.82 (fp. Queen's Hall, London, 31 August 1916)
- 1922 – Youth, Sport, Loyalty, overture, Op.90 (fp. Royal Academy of Music, London, 20 July 1922)

Concertante works

- 1875 – Larghetto and Allegretto, for cello and orchestra, Op.10
- 1884–85 – Violin Concerto in C♯ minor, Op.32 (fp. Birmingham Festival, 26 August 1885)
- 1889 – Pibroch, suite for violin and orchestra, Op.42 (fp. Leeds Festival, 10 October 1889)
- 1891 – Highland Ballad, for violin and orchestra, Op.47 No.1 (fp. St James's Hall, London, 17 May 1893)
- 1895 – Scottish Concerto, for piano and orchestra, Op.55 (fp. Philharmonic Society, London, 24 March 1897)
- 1906–07 – Suite, for violin and orchestra, Op.68 (fp. Queen's Hall, London, 18 February 1907)

Choral works

- 1881 – The Bride, cantata, Op.25 (fp. Worcester Festival, 6 September 1881)
- 1882 – Jason, cantata, Op.26 (fp. Bristol Festival, 19 October 1882)
- 1884 – The Rose of Sharon, dramatic oratorio, Op.30 (fp. Norwich Festival, 16 October 1884)
- 1886 – The Story of Sayid, cantata, Op.34 (fp. Leeds Festival, 13 October 1886)
- 1887 – A Jubilee Ode, for soli, chorus and orchestra, Op.36 (fp. Crystal Palace, London, 22 June 1887)
- 1887 – The New Covenant, ode for chorus, military band and organ, Op.38 (fp. Glasgow International Festival, 8 May 1888)
- 1888–89 – The Dream of Jubal, poem with music, Op.41 (fp. Liverpool Philharmonic Society, 5 February 1889)
- 1889 – The Cotter’s Saturday Night, cantata, Op.39 (fp. Edinburgh Choral Union, 16 December 1889)
- 1891 – Veni Creator Spiritus, cantata, Op.46 (fp. Birmingham Festival, 6 October 1891)
- 1892 – Bethlehem, mystery [oratorio], Op.49 (fp. Royal Albert Hall, London, 12 April 1894)
- 1904 – The Witch’s Daughter, cantata, Op.66 (fp. Leeds Festival, 5 October 1904)
- 1908 – The Sun-God’s Return, cantata, Op.69 (fp. Cardiff Festival, 21 September 1910)

Operatic works

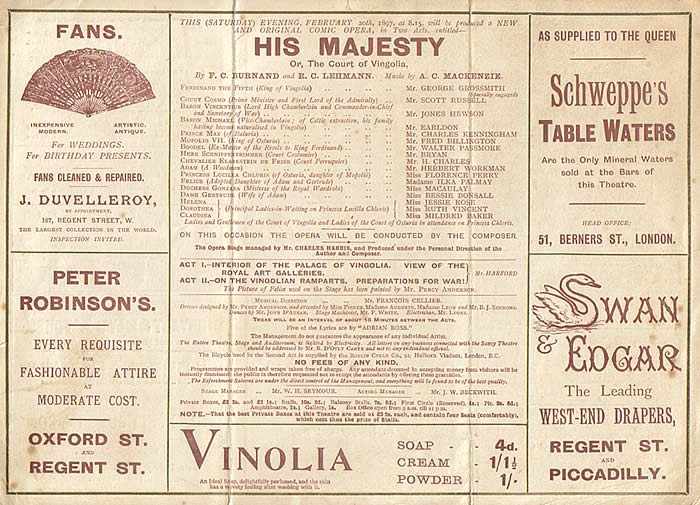
Cast list from opening night programme at the Savoy Theatre

- 1882–83 – Colomba, lyrical drama, Op.28 (fp. Drury Lane Theatre, London, 9 April 1883)
- 1886 – The Troubadour, lyrical drama, Op.33 (fp. Drury Lane Theatre, London, 8 June 1886)
- 1897 – His Majesty; or, The Court of Vingolia, comic opera (fp. Savoy Theatre, London, 20 February 1897) [full score lost]
- 1901 – The Cricket on the Hearth, Op.62 (fp. of the Overture Liverpool Philharmonic Society, 13 January 1903; fp. of entire opera Royal Academy of Music, London, 6 June 1914)
- 1904–05 – The Knights of the Road, operetta, Op.65 (fp. Palace Theatre, London, 27 February 1905) [full score lost]
- 1916–20 – The Eve of St John, Op.87 (fp. British National Opera Company, Liverpool, 16 April 1924)

Incidental music

- 1890 – Ravenswood, Op.45 (fp. Lyceum Theatre, London, September 1890) [full score lost]
- 1891 – Marmion, Op.43 (fp. Theatre Royal, Glasgow, April 1891)
- 1897 – The Little Minister, Op.57 (fp. Haymarket Theatre, London, 6 November 1897)
- 1898 – Manfred, Op.58 (written for the Lyceum Theatre, London, but the production was cancelled)
- 1901 – Coriolanus, Op.61 (fp. Lyceum Theatre, London, 15 April 1901)

Musical recitation

- 1890 – Ellen McJones, recitation with piano
- 1895 – Eugene Aram, recitation with orchestra, Op.59 No.2 (fp. Queen's Hall, London, 2 October 1895) [full score lost]
- 1911 – Dickens in Camp, recitation with piano

Chamber

- 1867 – Piano Trio in Bb
- 1868 – String Quartet in G
- 1873 – Piano Quartet in Eb, Op. 11
- 1882 – Three pieces for organ, Op.27
- 1888 – Six pieces for violin and piano, Op.37
- 1895 – From the North, nine pieces for violin and piano, Op.53
- 1905 – Larghetto religioso for violin and piano
- 1913 – Invocation for violin and piano, Op.76
- 1915 – Four Dance Measures for violin and piano, Op.80
- 1920 – In Memoriam, postlude for organ and violin
- 1922 – Distant Chimes for violin and piano, Op.89
- 1924 – Gipsy Dance for violin and piano
- 1928 – Two pieces for violin and piano, Op.91

Piano solo

- 1861 – Nocturne
- 1861 – Variations in E minor
- 1862 – Sehnsucht
- 1862 – Ungarisch
- 1876 – Rustic Scenes, Op.9
- 1877 – Five Pieces, Op.13
- 1877 – Trois Morceaux, Op.15
- 1879 – Six Compositions, Op.20
- 1880 – Scenes in the Scottish Highlands (three pieces), Op.23
- 1885? – Six Song Transcriptions by Giuseppe Buonamici
- 1899 – Morris Dance
- 1909 – Fantasia in Eb, Op.70
- 1915 – English Air with Variations, Op.81
- 1916 – Jottings – 6 Cheerful Little Pieces (Books 1 and 2)
- 1916 – Odds and Ends (four pieces), Op.83
- 1921 – Varying Moods (four pieces)
