= Carlos Antognazzi =

Argentine writer and photographer

Carlos Antognazzi

Carlos O. Antognazzi (born 14 May 1963) is an Argentine writer and photographer. He was born in Santa Fe.

His books of fiction, essay, short story and poetry include Historias de hombres solos (1983), Punto muerto (1987), Ciudad (1988), El décimo círculo (1991), Llanura azul (1992), Narradores santafesinos (1994), Apuntes de literatura (1995), Cinco historias (1996), Mare nostrum (1997), Zig Zag (1997), Road movie (1998), Inside (1998), Al sol (2002), Arte mayor (2003), Los puertos grises (2003), riverrun (2005), Señas mortales (2005), Triplex (2008), Ahab (2009), Interludio (2010), Leve aire (2010), Las estaciones (2012), Sísifo (2013), Agua quemada (2018), Namastê: cruces digresivos sobre arte, creación, filosofía y haiku (2019), Principios quiméricos (2020), Fases (2021), Mensajes secretos (2023), Tulane (2026).

He has contributed to Argentine papers and journals such as El Litoral (Santa Fe), La Capital (Rosario), La Voz del Interior (Córdoba), Cuásar, Sinergia, Clepsidra, El Grillo (all of them, Buenos Aires) and Gaceta Literaria (Santa Fe).

He has received several literary prizes including "Nacional de cuento" (1986), "Anual de novela" (1987/8), "Alcides Greca" (1992 y 2007), "Felisberto Hernández" (1993/94), "Santo Tomás de Aquino" (1997), "Ciudad de Huelva" (España, short story, 2004), "Tiflos" (España, fiction, 2005), "José Rafael López Rosas" (poetry, 2009). Is "Santafesino Destacado" 2004, by Honorable Consejo Municipal of Santa Fe city.
