= Monteriggioni =

- Comune
- Comune di Monteriggioni
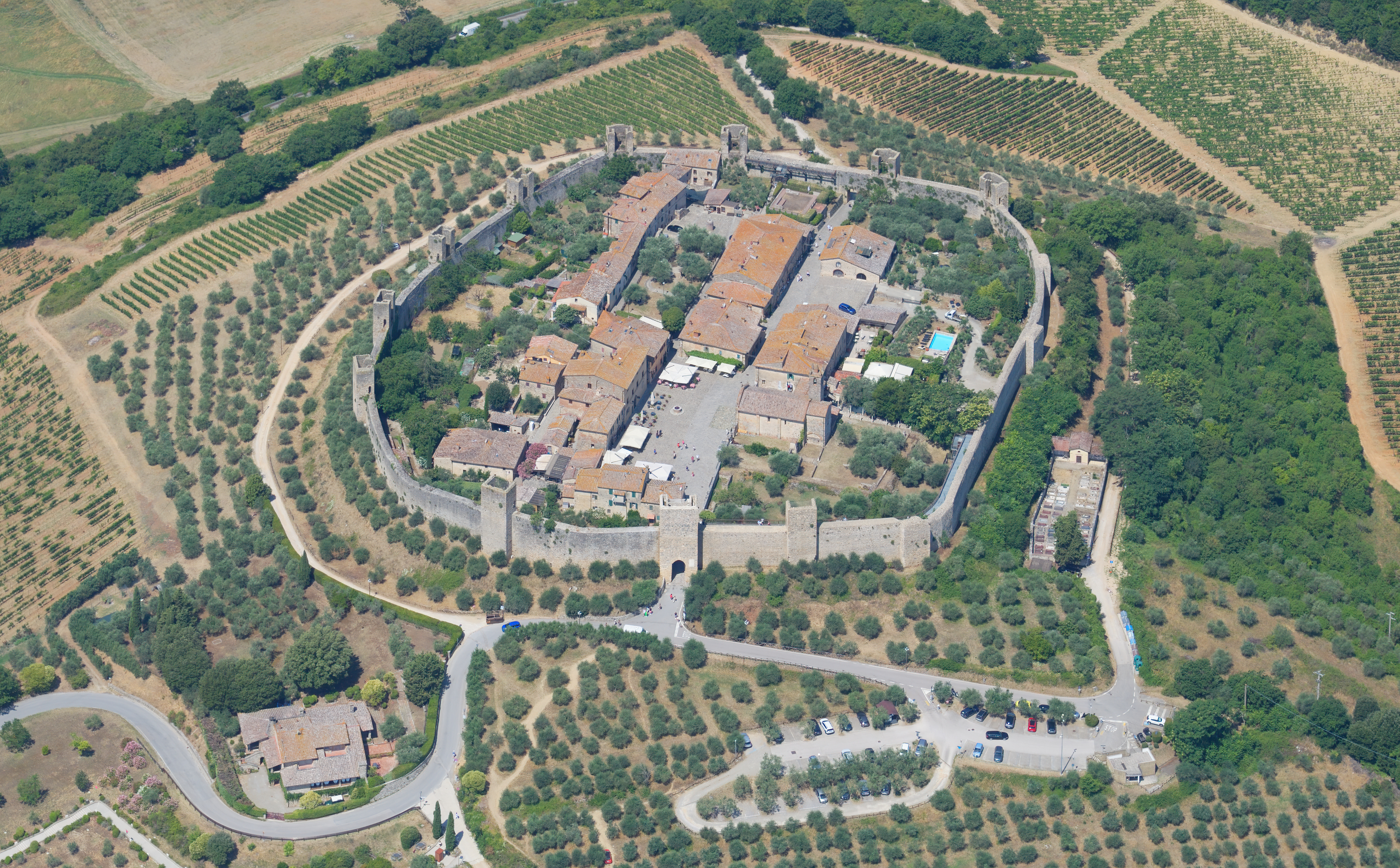
- Aerial view of Monteriggioni

- Coat of arms

- Location within Italy Location within Tuscany
- Coordinates: 43°23′24.01″N 11°13′23.95″E
- Country: Italy
- Region: Tuscany
- Province: Siena (SI)
- Frazioni: Abbadia a Isola, Badesse, Basciano, Belverde, Castellina Scalo, Lornano, Montarioso, Quercegrossa, San Martino, Santa Colomba, Strove, Tognazza, Uopini

Government
  - Mayor: Andrea Frosini (PD)

Area
  - Total: 99.72 km^{2} (38.50 sq mi)
- Elevation: 200 m (660 ft)

Population (2022)
  - Total: 10,099
  - Density: 101.3/km^{2} (262.3/sq mi)
- Demonym: Monteriggionesi
- Time zone: UTC+1 (CET)
  - Summer (DST): UTC+2 (CEST)
- Postal code: 53035
- Dialing code: 0577
- Patron saint: Assumption of Mary
- Saint day: 15 August
- Website: Official website

Monteriggioni is a comune in the province of Siena in the Italian region of Tuscany. The town is architecturally and culturally significant. It hosts several piazzas, and is referenced in Dante Alighieri's Divine Comedy. Monteriggioni borders the municipalities of Casole d'Elsa, Castellina in Chianti, Castelnuovo Berardenga, Colle di Val d'Elsa, Poggibonsi, Siena, and Sovicille.

== History ==
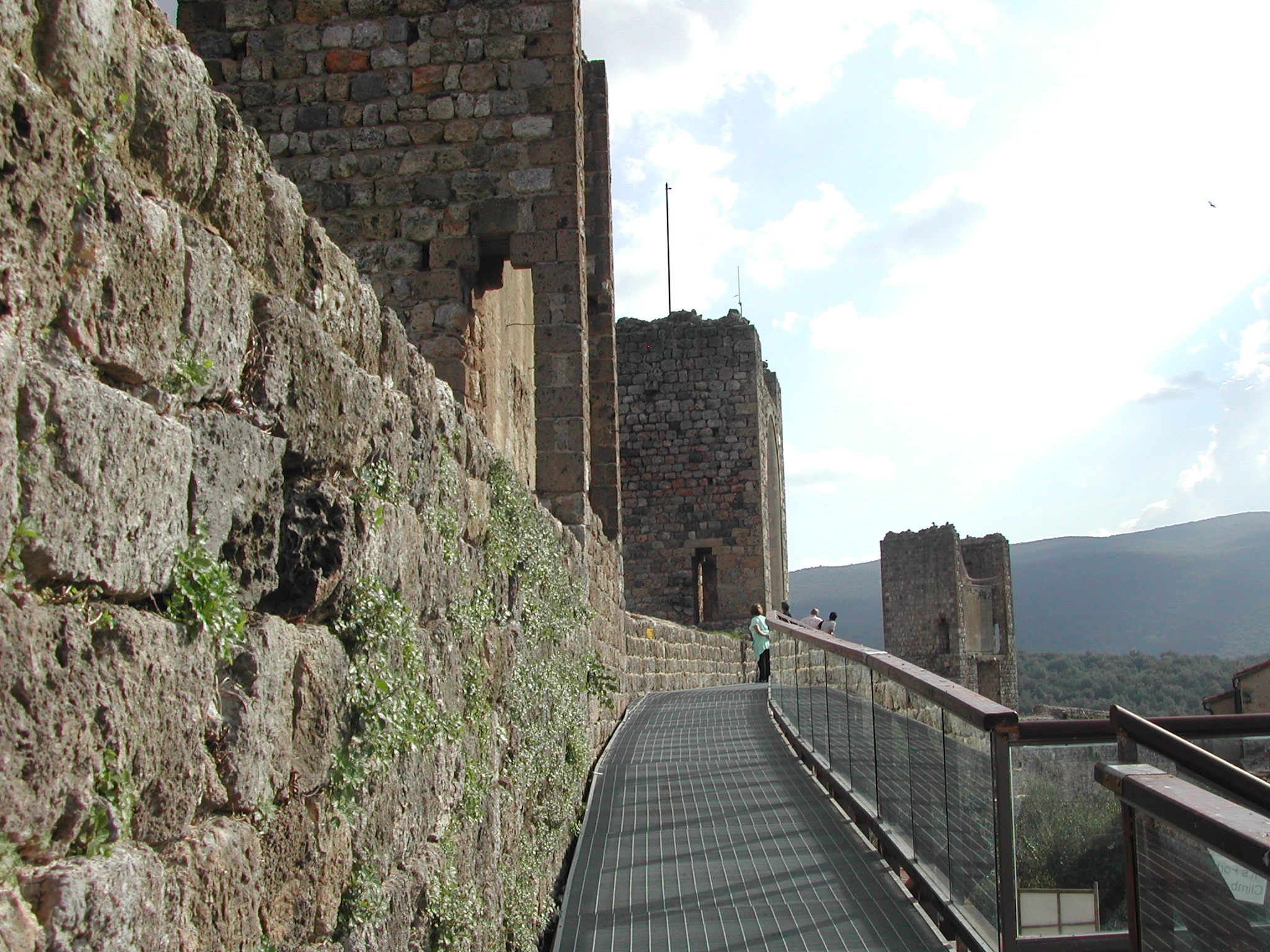
City walls of Monteriggioni.

Monteriggioni is a medieval walled town, located on a natural hillock, built by the Sienese in 1214–1219 as a front-line defensive fortification in their wars against Florence, by assuming command of the Via Cassia running through the Val d'Elsa and Val Staggia to the west. It withstood many attacks from both the Florentines and the forces of the Bishop of Volterra.

In 1554, the Sienese put the town's garrison under the command of Giovannino Zeti, who had been exiled from Florence. In 1554, in an act of reconciliation with the Medicis, Florence's ruling family, Zeti simply handed the keys of the town over to their forces—considered a "great betrayal" by the townspeople.

== Main sights ==
The roughly circular walls, totalling a length of about 570 metres (1,870 ft) and following the natural contours of the hill, were built between 1213 and 1219. There are 14 towers on square bases set at equidistance, and two portals or gates. One gate, the Porta Fiorentina, opens toward Florence to the north, and the other, the Porta Romana, faces Rome to the south. The main street within the walls connects the two gates in a roughly straight line.

The main town square, the Piazza Roma, is dominated by a Romanesque church with a simple, plain façade. Other houses, some in the Renaissance style (once owned by local nobles, gentry, and wealthy merchants), face into the piazza. Off the main piazza smaller streets give way to public gardens fronted by the other houses and small businesses of the town. In more hostile times, these gardens provided vital sustenance when enemies gathered around the walls during sieges.

Other sights in the town's countryside include:

- Badia of Santi Salvatore e Cirino in Abbadia a Isola, a Romanesque abbey from the mid-12th century
- Romanesque church of San Lorenzo in Colle Ciupi
- Romanesque Pieve of Santa Maria a Castello, known since as early as 971
- Romanesque-Gothic hermitage of San Leonardo al Lago
- Villa Santa Colomba

== Cultural significance ==
The Tuscan poet Dante Alighieri used the turrets of Monteriggioni to evoke the sight of the ring of giants encircling the Infernal abyss.

As with circling round
Of turrets, Montereggion crowns his walls,
E’en thus the shore, encompassing th’ abyss,
Was turreted with giants, half their length
Uprearing, horrible, whom Jove from heav’n
Yet threatens, when his mutt’ring thunder rolls.

Monteriggioni also plays a significant role in the games Assassin's Creed II and Assassin's Creed: Brotherhood, both of which are loosely based around certain key historical events in Renaissance Italy. It is home to protagonist Ezio Auditore and his uncle Mario, who live in the fictional Villa Auditore, which is based on Villa di Maiano.

== Education ==
Public schools include:

- Preschools (Scuole dell'Infanzia): C. Collodi, Don Muzzi, and Pinocchio
- Elementary schools (Scuole primare): I. Calvino, G. Rodari, and Don L. Milani
- One junior high school (Scuola secondaria di 1° grado): Scuola Media Statale "Dante Alighieri"

All public schools within the commune are a part of the Istituto Comprensivo Statale di Monteriggioni, School District #38.

International School of Siena, a private international school, is in the commune.

== Demographic evolution ==
Inhabitant's census of Monteriggioni
Population (1861-2021) Residential population (2021) according to the Istituto nazionale di statistica.
Population by local area census.

== Municipal government ==
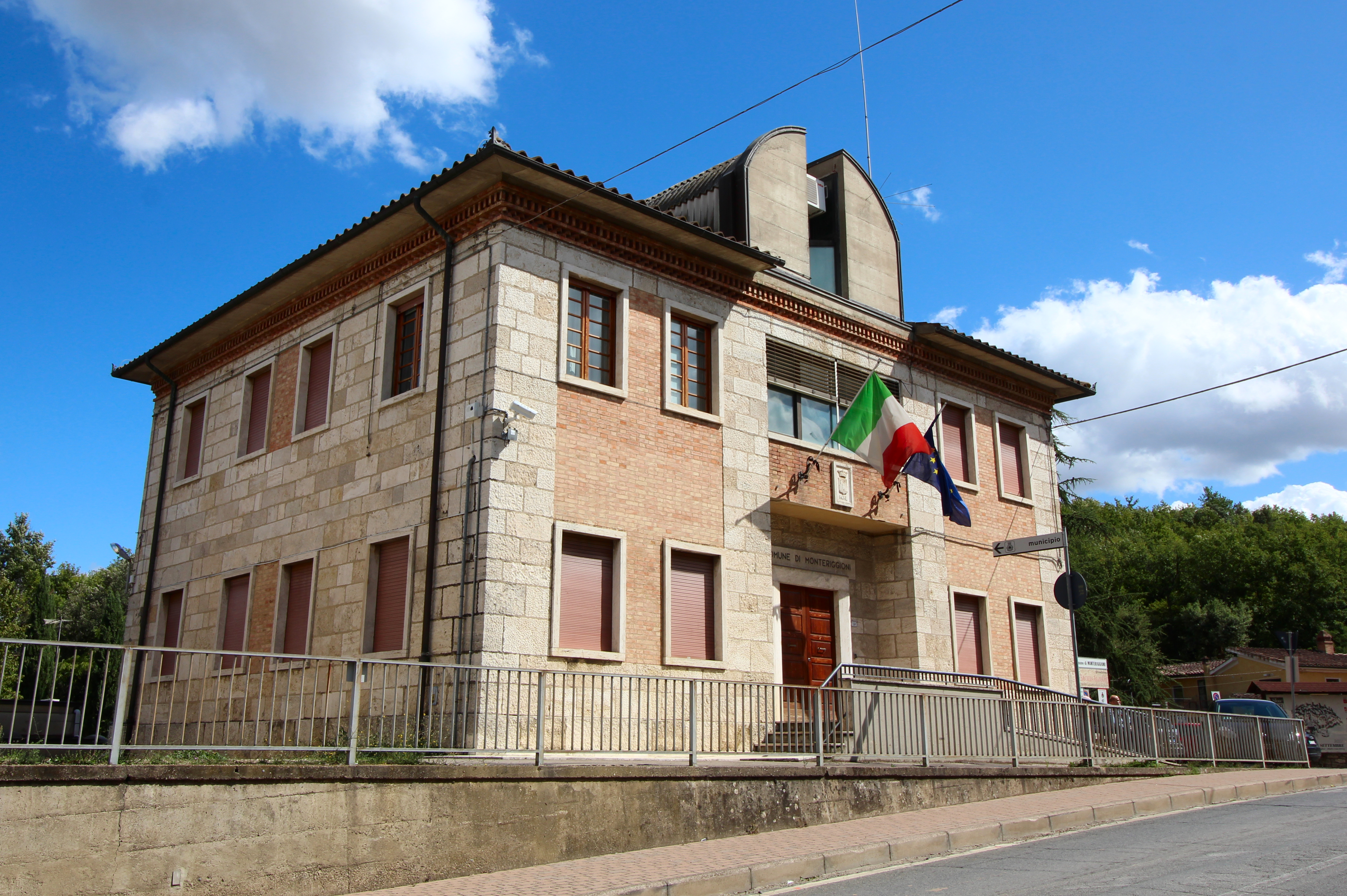
The Town Hall

Monteriggioni is headed by a mayor (sindaco) assisted by a legislative body, the consiglio comunale, and an executive body, the giunta comunale. Since 1995, the mayor and members of the consiglio comunale are directly elected together by resident citizens, while from 1945 to 1995 the mayor was chosen by the legislative body. The giunta comunale is chaired by the mayor, who appoints others members, called assessori. The offices of the comune are housed in a building usually called the municipio or palazzo comunale.

Since 1995, the mayor of Monteriggioni is directly elected by citizens, originally every four, then every five years. The current mayor is Andrea Frosini (PD), elected on 26 May 2019 with 43.3% of the votes and re-elected on 9 June 2024 with 64.9% of the votes.

Mayor	Term start	Term end	Party
Paolo Casprini	24 April 1995	14 June 2004	DS
Bruno Valentini	14 June 2004	22 April 2013	PD
Raffaella Senesi	22 April 2013 (Note: As vice-mayor from 22 April 2013 till 26 May 2014)	27 May 2019	PD
Andrea Frosini	27 May 2019	incumbent	PD

== Gallery ==

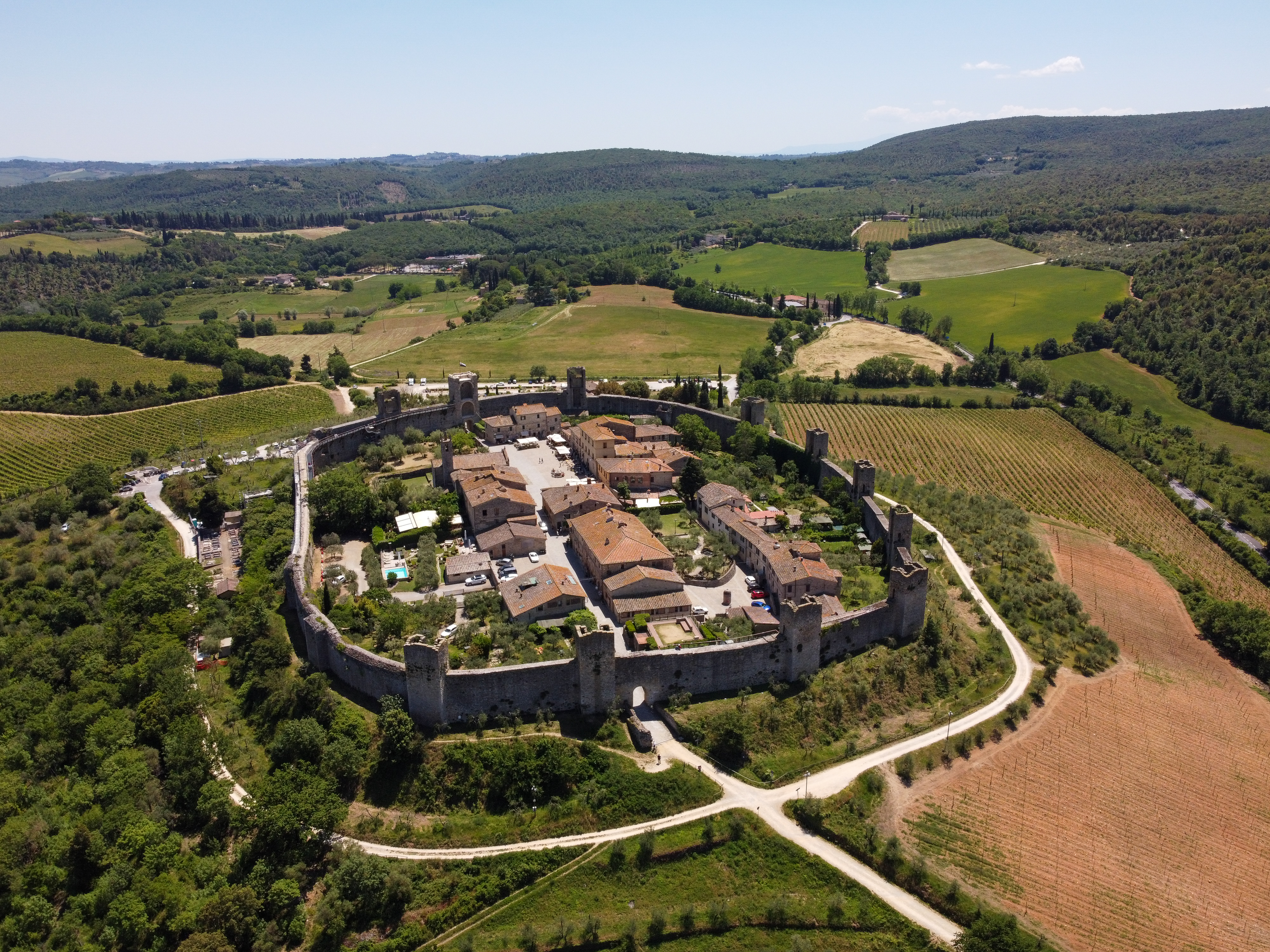

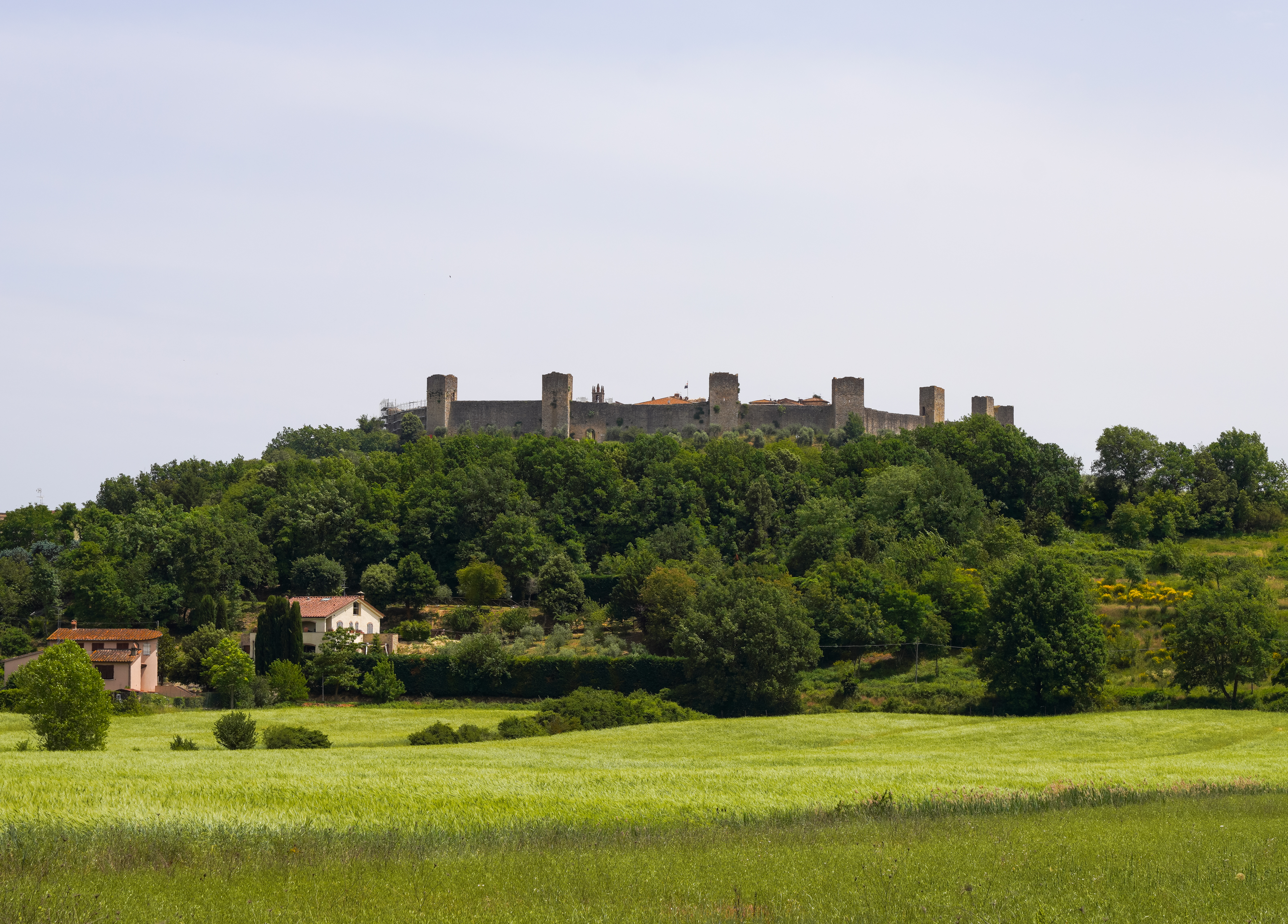

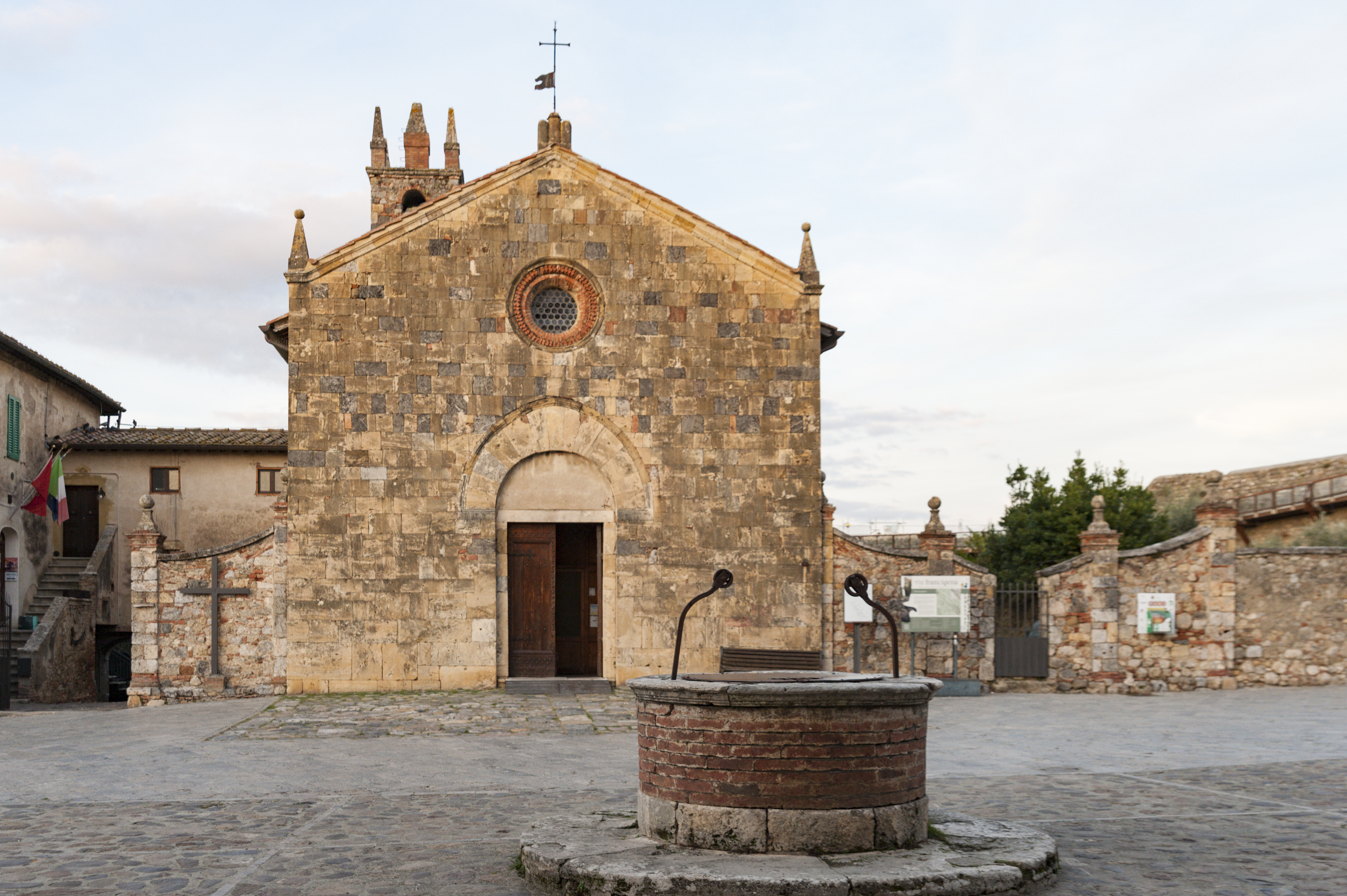

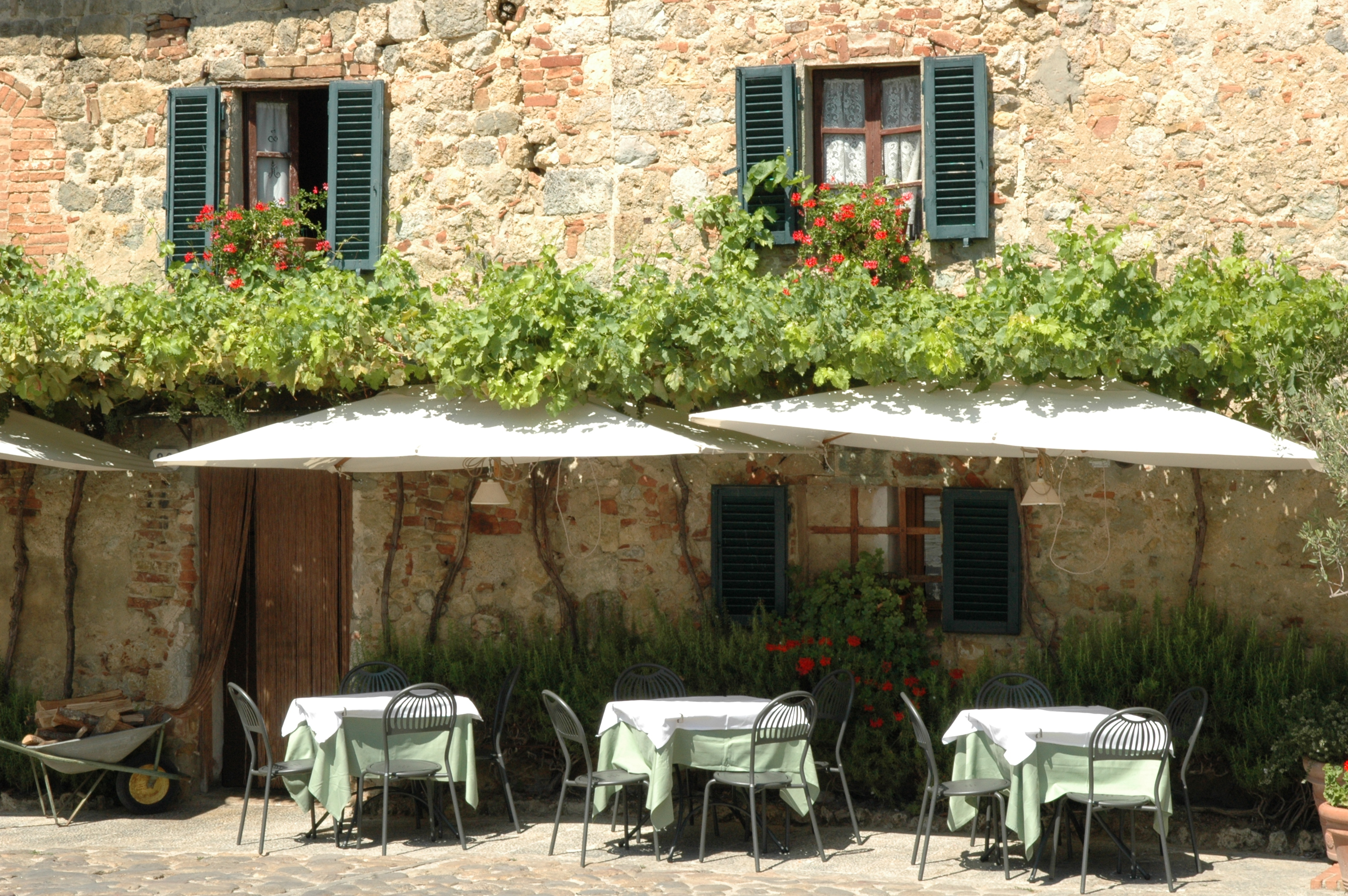

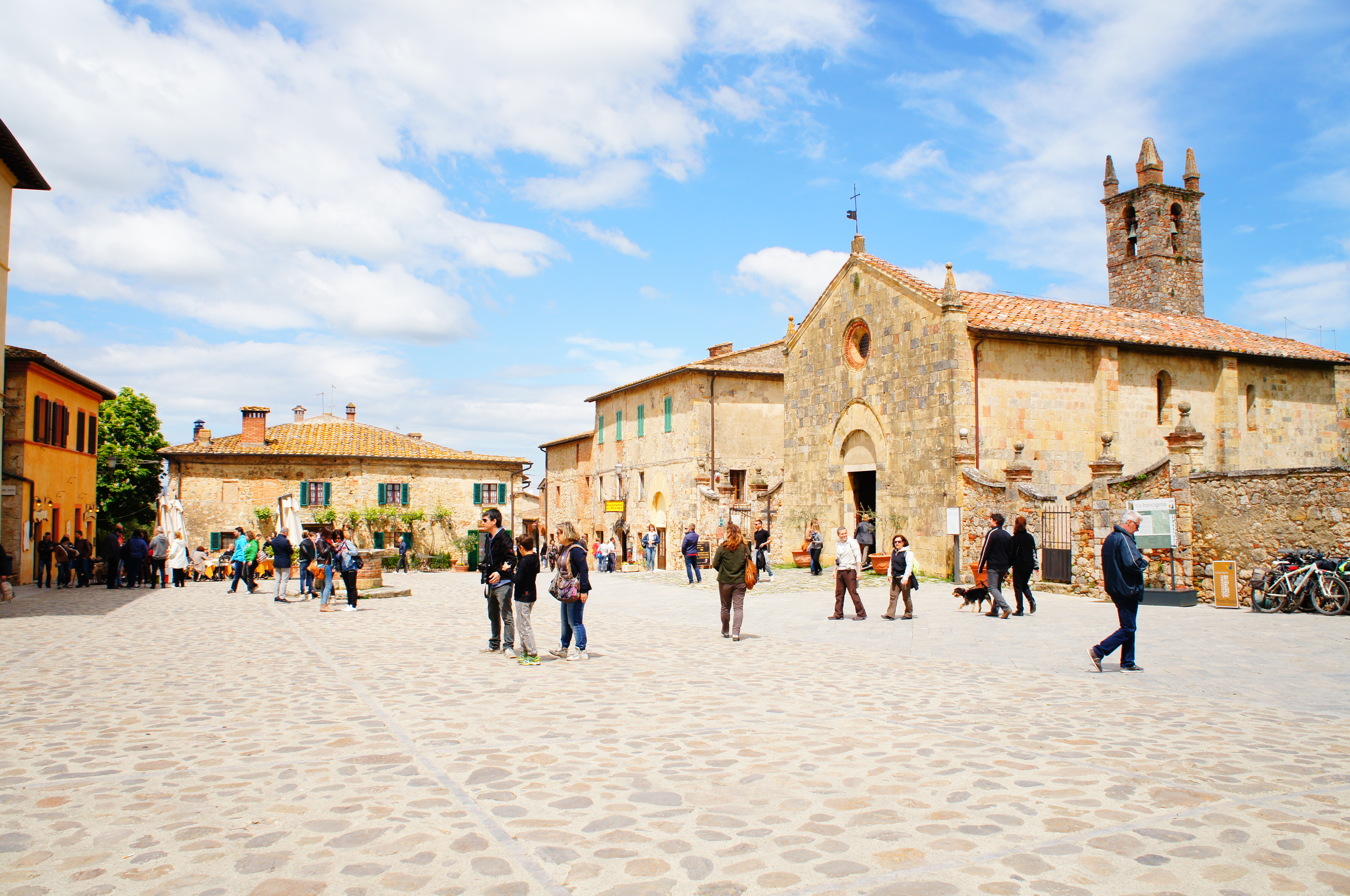
