= Tognazza =

- Frazione
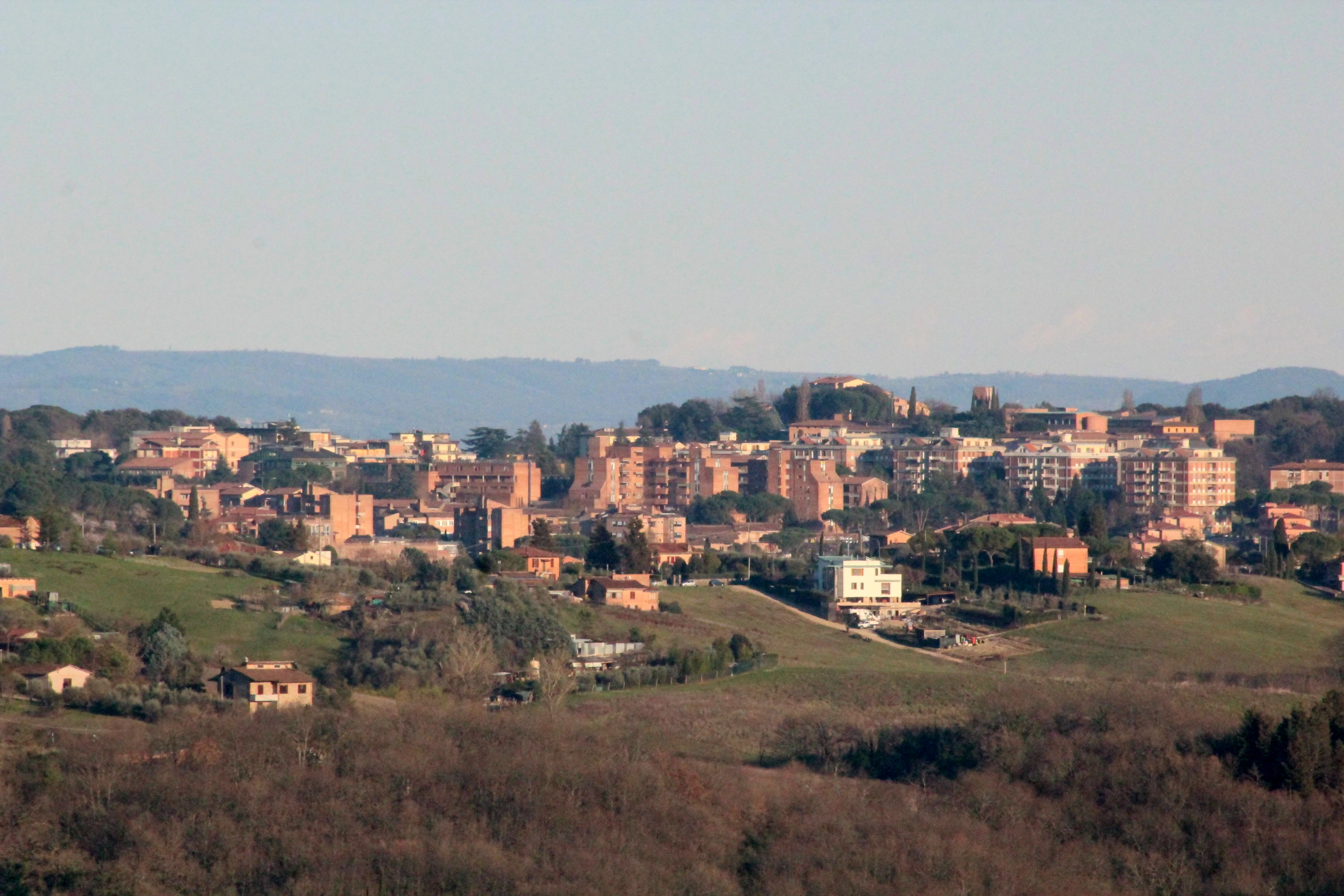
- View of Tognazza

- Location of Tognazza in Italy
- Coordinates: 43°20′44″N 11°17′13″E
- Country: Italy
- Region: Tuscany
- Province: Siena (SI)
- Comune: Monteriggioni
- Elevation: 340 m (1,120 ft)

Population (2011)
  - Total: 417
- Time zone: UTC+1 (CET)
  - Summer (DST): UTC+2 (CEST)

Tognazza is a village in Tuscany, central Italy, administratively a frazione of the comune of Monteriggioni, province of Siena. At the time of the 2001 census its population was 323.

Tognazza is about 10 km from Siena and 9 km from Monteriggioni.
