= Montepulciano Cathedral =

Church building in Montepulciano, Italy

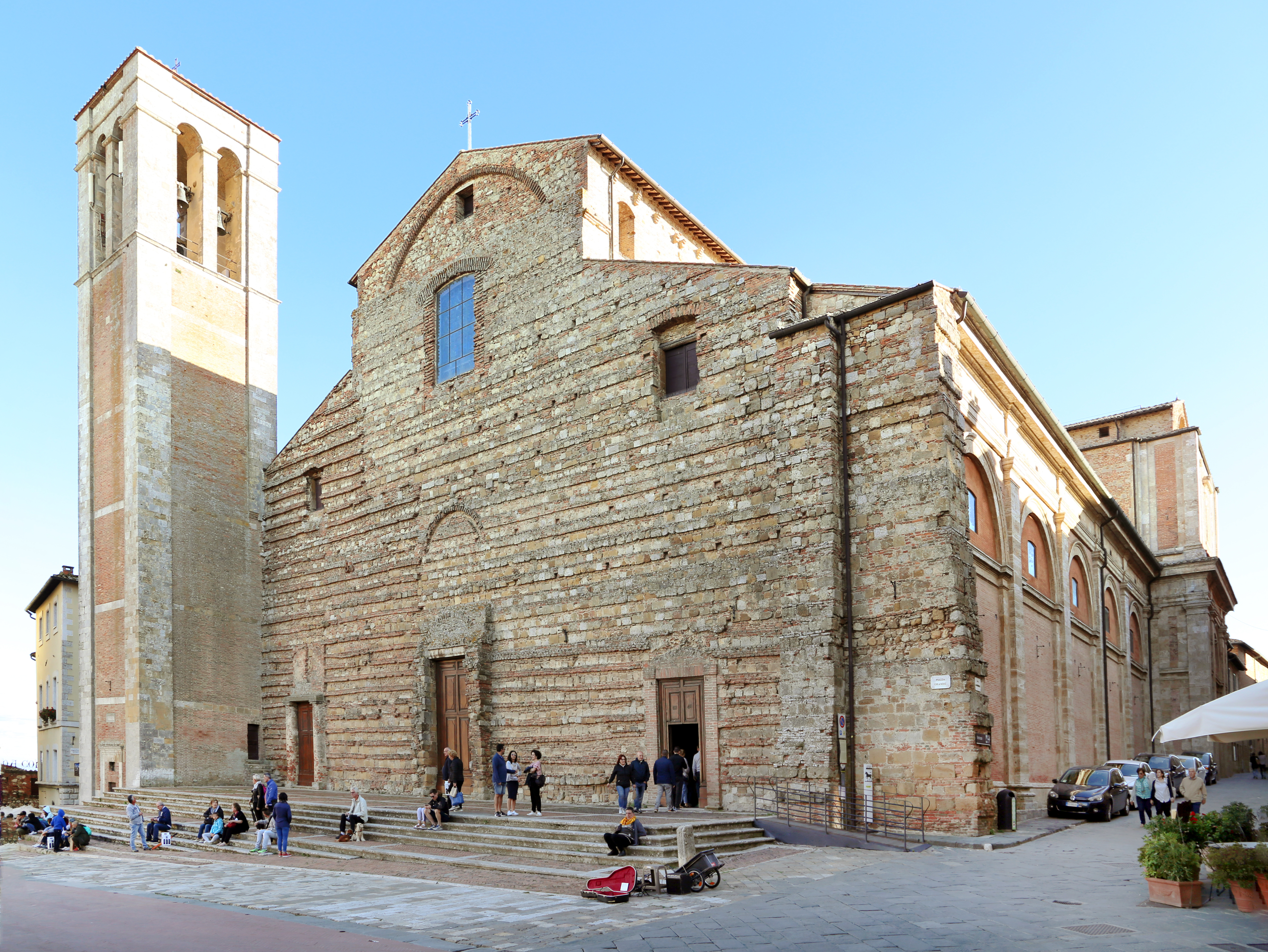

Santa Maria Assunta is a cathedral and principal place of worship in Montepulciano. The cathedral was consecrated in 1712. Among the artworks in the cathedral is an Assumption of the Virgin triptych on the high altar painted by Taddeo di Bartolo in 1401, which includes a self portrait as the apostle Thaddeus.
