= Gracciano, Montepulciano =

Gracciano
- Frazione
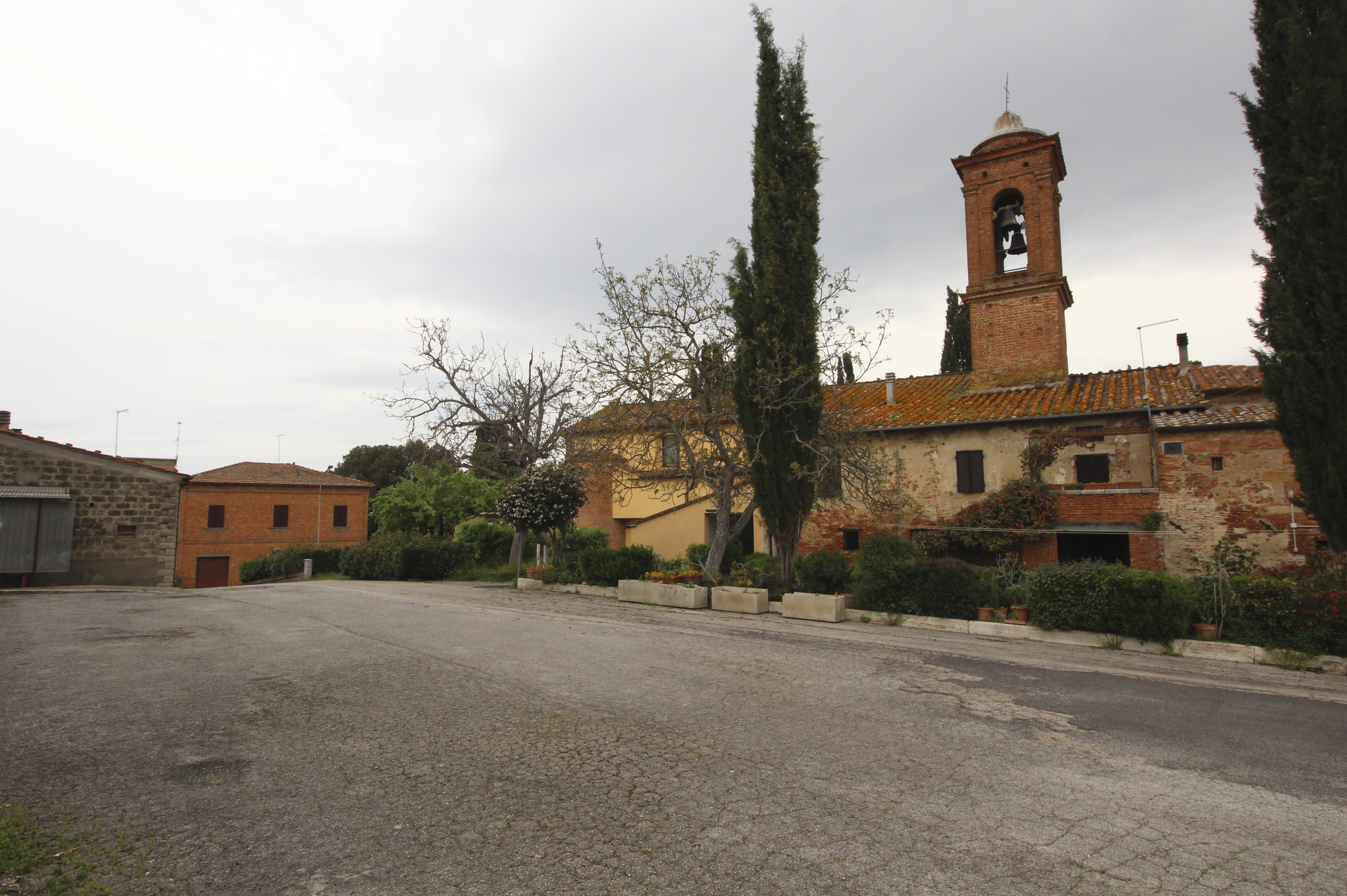

- Location of Gracciano in Italy
- Coordinates: 43°7′54″N 11°49′35″E
- Country: Italy
- Region: Tuscany
- Province: Siena (SI)
- Comune: Montepulciano
- Elevation: 290 m (950 ft)

Population (2011)
  - Total: 583
- Time zone: UTC+1 (CET)
  - Summer (DST): UTC+2 (CEST)

Gracciano is a village in Tuscany, central Italy, administratively a frazione of the comune of Montepulciano, province of Siena. At the time of the 2001 census its population was 507. Gracciano is about 58 km from Siena and 6 km from Montepulciano.

Dominican prioress and saint Agnes of Montepulciano was born in Gracciano in 1268.
