= Agnes of Montepulciano =

Catholic saint (1268–1317)

Saint Agnes of Montepulciano O.P.
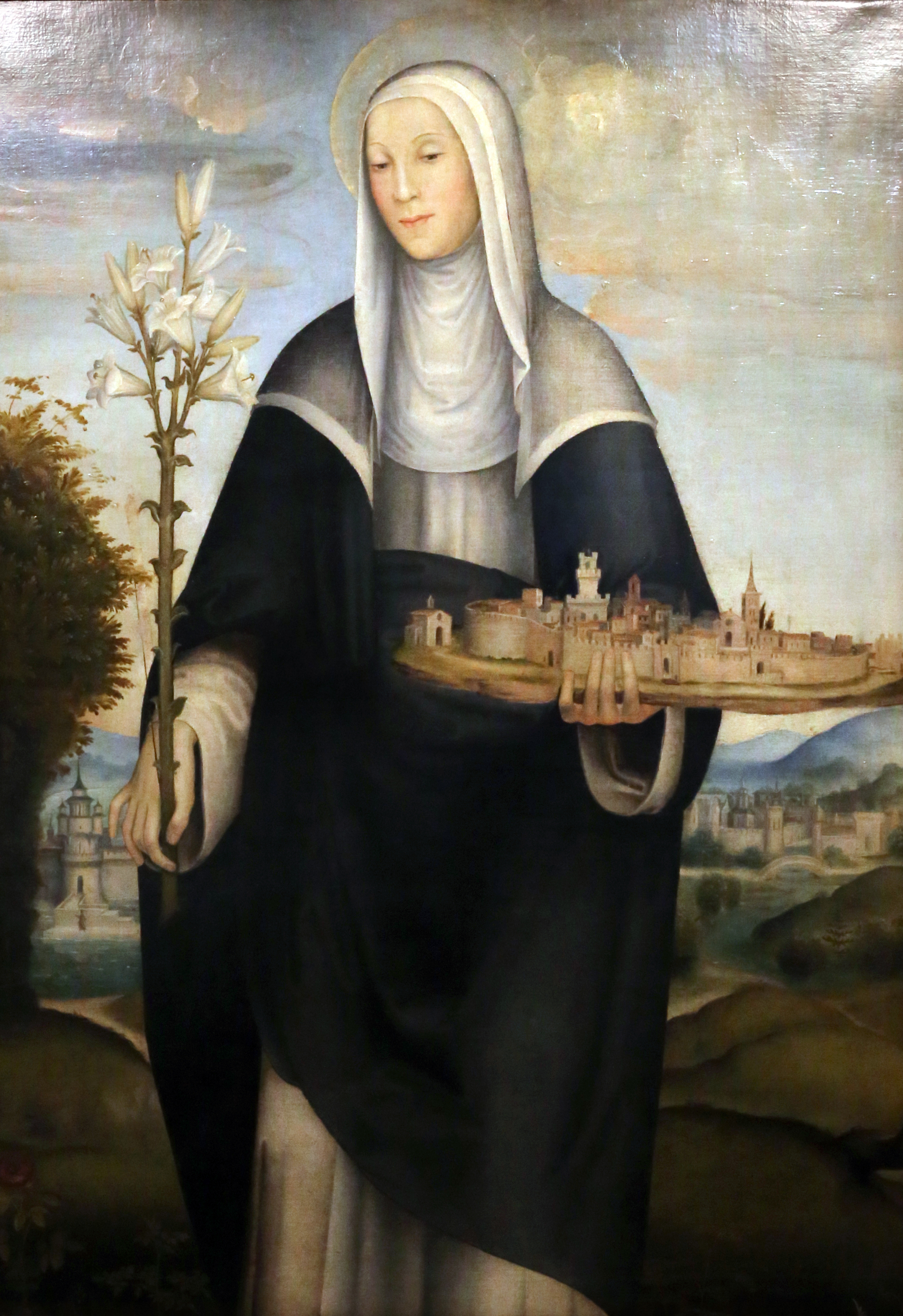
- Signs of Saint Agnes by Domenico Beccafumi, 1507
- Born: January 28, 1268; Gracciano, Montepulciano, Papal States
- Died: April 20, 1317 (aged 49); Montepulciano, Papal States
- Venerated in: Catholic Church (Dominican Order)
- Canonized: 1726 by Pope Benedict XIII
- Major shrine: Church of St Agnes, Montepulicano, Siena, Italy
- Feast: 20 April
- Attributes: Lily and a lamb

Agnes of Montepulciano, OP (28 January 1268 – 20 April 1317) was a Dominican prioress in medieval Tuscany who was known as a miracle worker during her lifetime. She is honored as a saint by the Catholic Church.

== Life ==
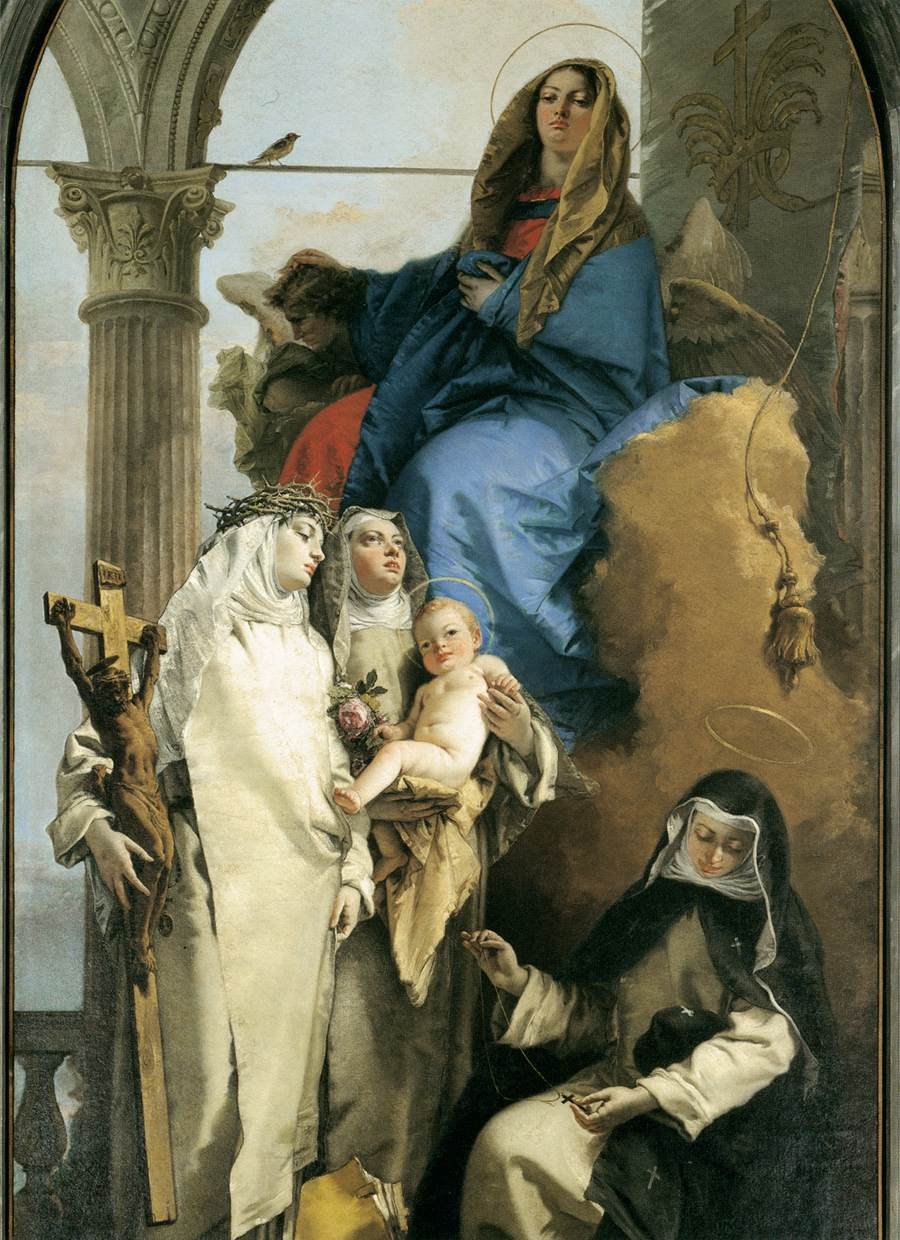
The Virgin Appearing to Dominican Saints (Saint Rose of Lima, Agnes of Montepulciano and Catherine of Siena) by Giovanni Battista Tiepolo

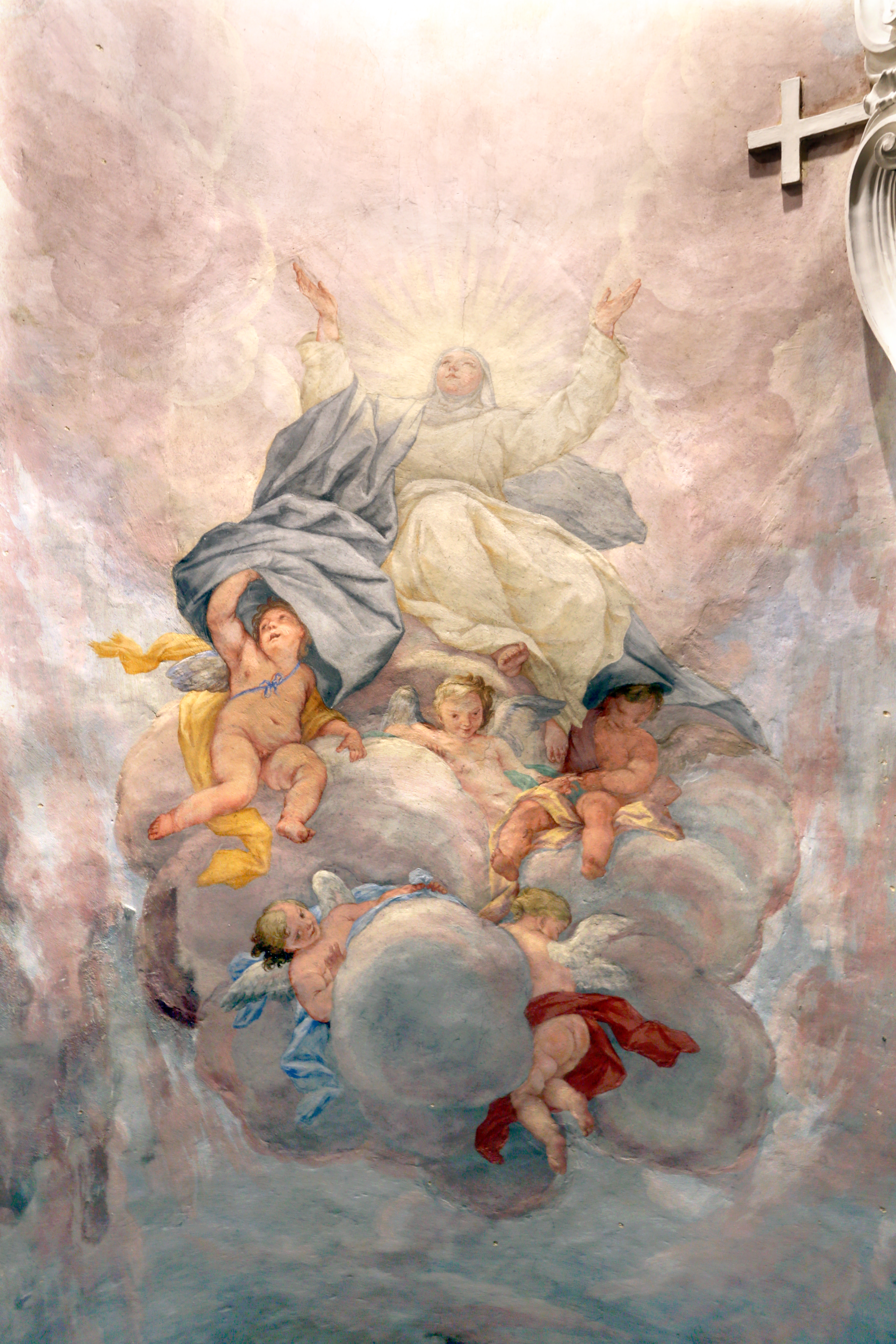
Cell of Sant'Agnese di Montepulciano, with frescoes by Nicola Nasini

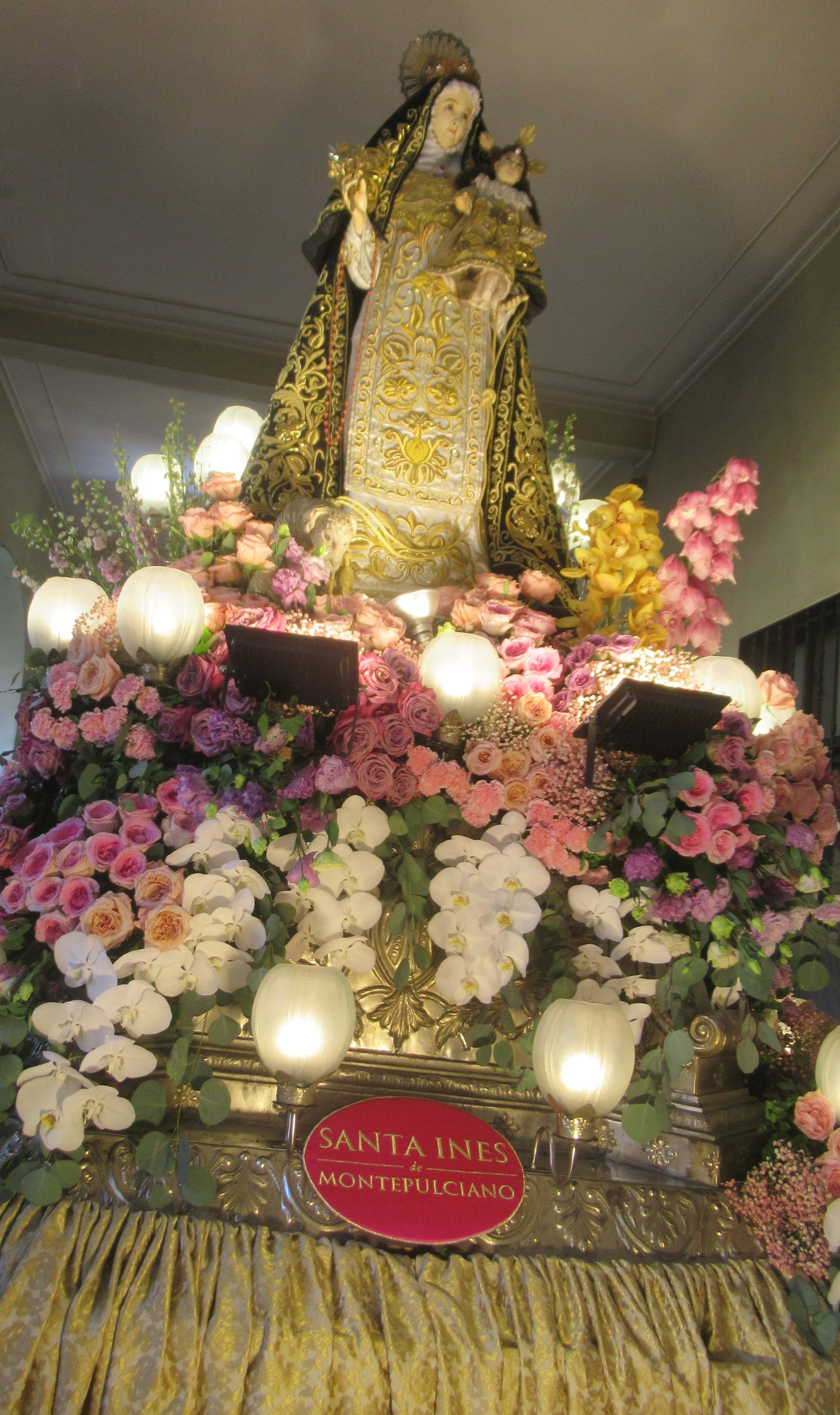
18th-century ivory statue, Philippines

Agnes was born in 1268 into the noble Segni family in Gracciano, a frazione of Montepulciano, then part of the Papal States. At the age of nine, she convinced her parents to allow her to enter a Franciscan monastery of women in the city known as the "Sisters of the Sack", after the rough religious habit they wore. They lived a simple contemplative life. She received the permission of the pope to be accepted into this life at such a young age, which was normally against Church law.

In 1281, the lord of the castle of Proceno, a fief of Orvieto, invited the nuns of Montepulciano to send some of their sisters to Proceno to found a new monastery. Agnes was among the nuns sent to found this new community. At the age of fourteen she was appointed bursar.

In 1288 Agnes, despite her youth at only 20 years of age, was noted for her devotion to the Blessed Sacrament and deep life of prayer, and was elected as the prioress of the community. There she gained a reputation for performing miracles; people suffering from mental and physical ailments seemed cured by her presence. She was reported to have "multiplied loaves", creating many from a few on numerous occasions, recalling the Gospel miracle of the loaves and fishes. She herself, however, suffered severe bouts of illness which lasted long periods of time.

In 1306, Agnes was recalled to head the monastery in Montepulciano. Agnes reached a high degree of contemplative prayer and is said to have been favoured with many visions. After her return, she proceeded to build a church, Santa Maria Novella in Florence, to honour the Blessed Mother, as she felt she had been commanded to do in a mystical vision several years earlier. She also had a vision of Dominic Guzman, under the inspiration of which she led the nuns of her monastery to embrace the Rule of St. Augustine as members of the Dominican Order. She was frequently called upon to bring peace to the warring families of the city.

By 1316, Agnes' health had declined so greatly that her doctor suggested taking the cure at the thermal springs in the neighbouring town of Chianciano Terme. The nuns of the community prevailed upon her to take his recommendation. While many of the other bathers reported being cured of their illnesses, Agnes received no benefit from the springs. Her health deteriorated to such a degree that she had to be carried back to the monastery on a stretcher.

== Veneration ==
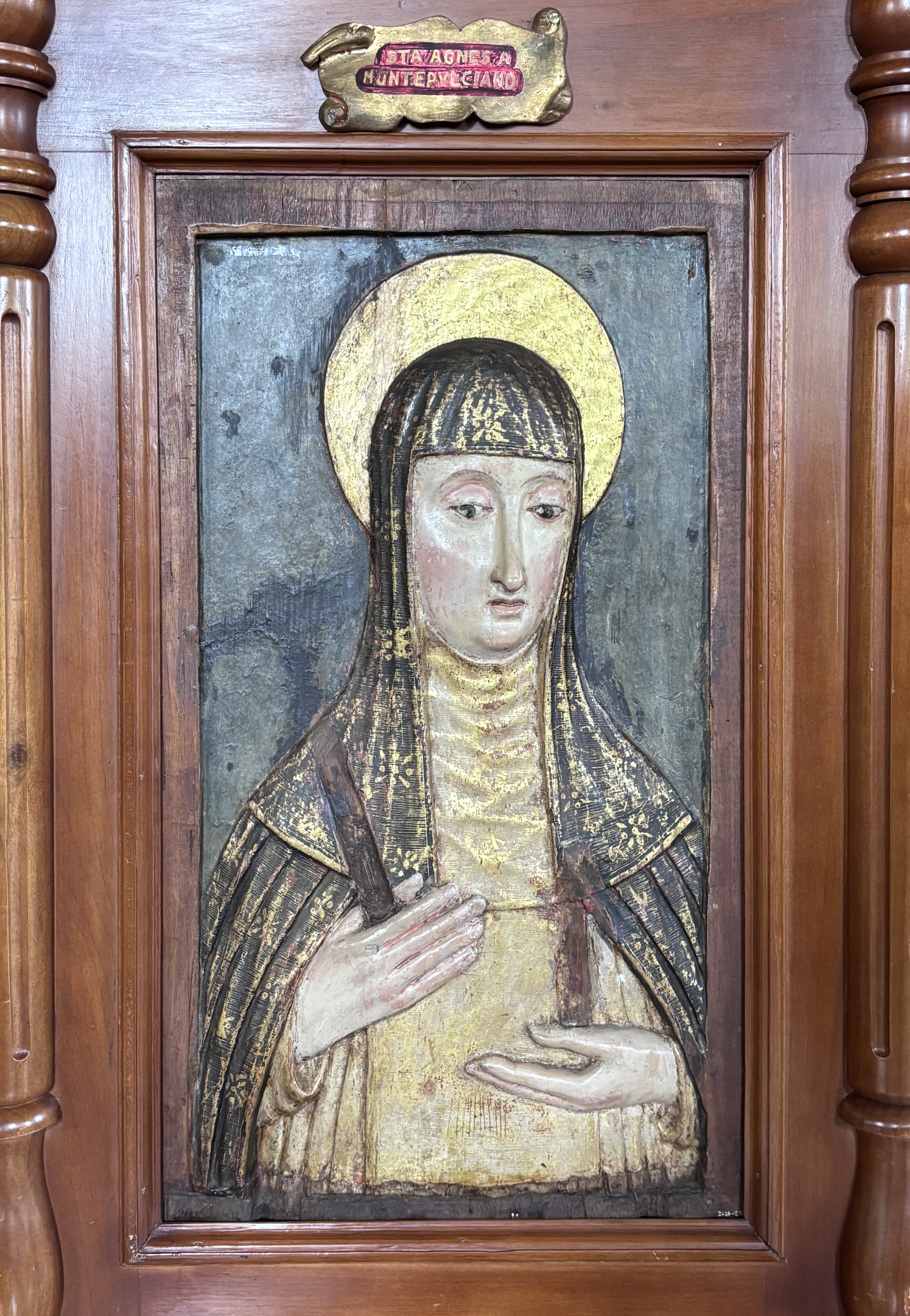
Agnes of Montepulciano by Diego de Robles (c. 16th century). Santo Domingo Convent, Quito.

Agnes died the following 20 April, at the age of 49. The Dominican friars attempted to obtain balsam (or myrrh) to embalm her body. It was found, however, to be producing a sweet odor on its own, and her limbs remained supple. When her body was moved years after her death to the monastery church, it was found to be incorrupt. Her tomb became the site of pilgrimages.

Some fifty years after her death, a Dominican friar, Raymond of Capua, who served as confessor to Catherine of Siena, wrote an account of Agnes' life. He described her body as still appearing as if she were alive. Catherine herself referred to her as "Our mother, the glorious Agnes". Catherine made a pilgrimage to Montepulciano while visiting her niece, Eugenie, who was a nun there. Another Dominican, Lorenzo Mariani of Rome, wrote another early biography of Agnes, in which he already referred to her as a saint.

In 1435 her remains were moved to the church of San Domenico, Orvieto.

Agnes was canonized by Pope Benedict XIII in 1726. The latest official edition of the Roman Martyrology commemorates Agnes under the date of 20 April. This is also the date of her feast day within the Dominican Order.

Agnes of Montepulciano is depicted as a Dominican nun with a cross or crucifix, lilies, and a lamb (a play upon the name "Agnes").

== See also ==
- The Incorruptibles
