= Valiano =

- Frazione
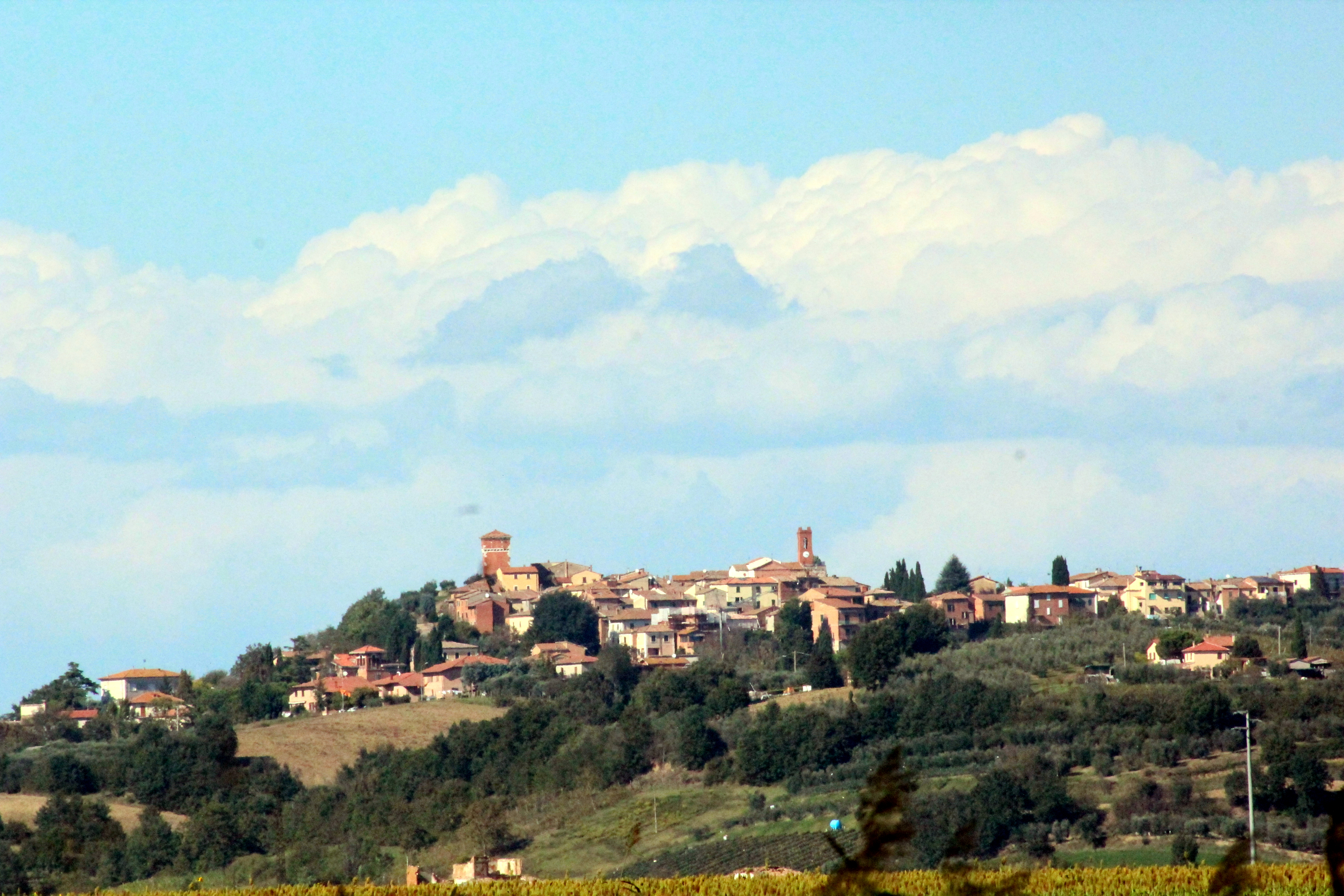
- Panorama of Valiano

- Location of Valiano in Italy
- Coordinates: 43°8′46″N 11°54′8″E
- Country: Italy
- Region: Tuscany
- Province: Siena (SI)
- Comune: Montepulciano
- Elevation: 335 m (1,099 ft)

Population
  - Total: 328 (2,001)
- Demonym: Valianesi
- Time zone: UTC+1 (CET)
  - Summer (DST): UTC+2 (CEST)
- Postal code: 53045
- Dialing code: 0578
- Patron saint: St. Lorenzo Martire
- Saint day: August 10

Valiano is a frazione of the town of Montepulciano in the Province of Siena, on the border between the regions of Umbria and Tuscany. It was an ancient feudal castle which, due to its strategic position and the role played by the family of Del Pecora (the family of Cavalieri), was an outpost of Val di Chiana of great historical importance from thirteenth century until the establishment of Grand Duchy of Tuscany.
