= Sant'Albino =

Village in Tuscany, Italy

- Frazione
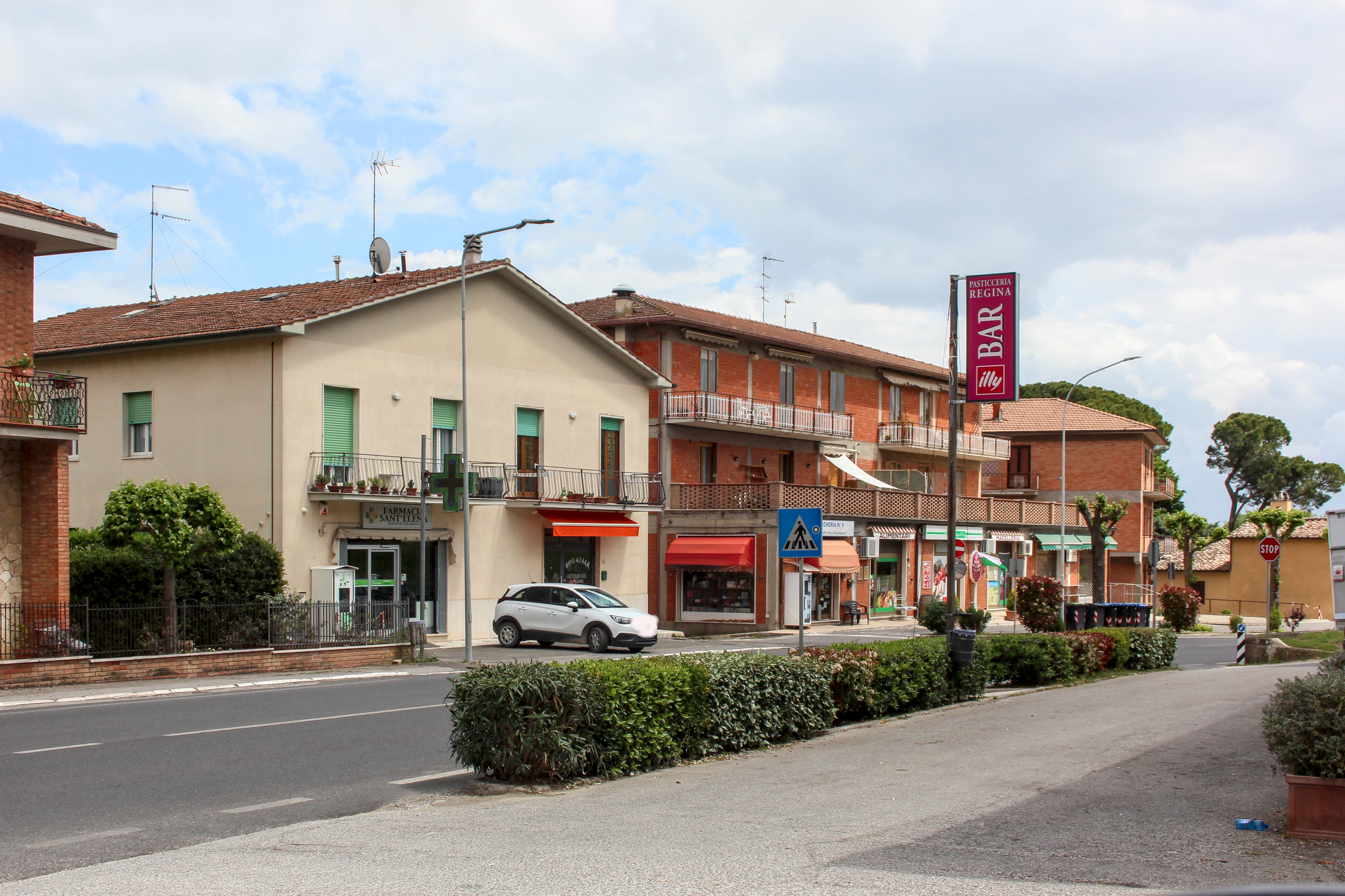
- view of Sant'Albino

- Location of Sant'Albino in Italy
- Coordinates: 43°4′16″N 11°48′21″E
- Country: Italy
- Region: Tuscany
- Province: Siena (SI)
- Comune: Montepulciano
- Elevation: 480 m (1,570 ft)

Population (2011)
  - Total: 1,227
- Time zone: UTC+1 (CET)
  - Summer (DST): UTC+2 (CEST)

Sant'Albino is a village in Tuscany, central Italy, administratively a frazione of the comune of Montepulciano, province of Siena. At the time of the 2001 census its population was 1,175.

Sant'Albino is about 67 km from Siena and 5 km from Montepulciano.

== Images ==
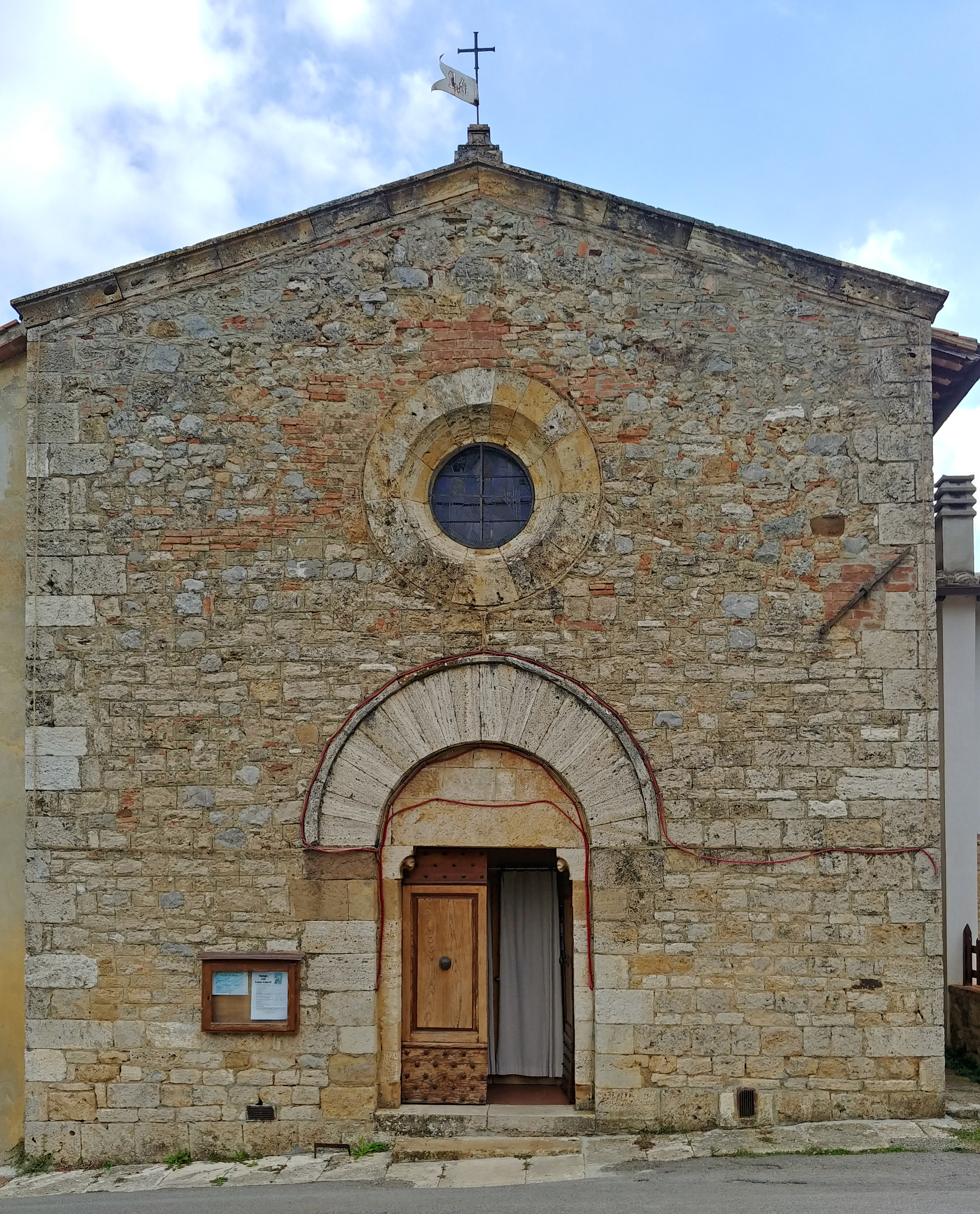
Sant'Albino

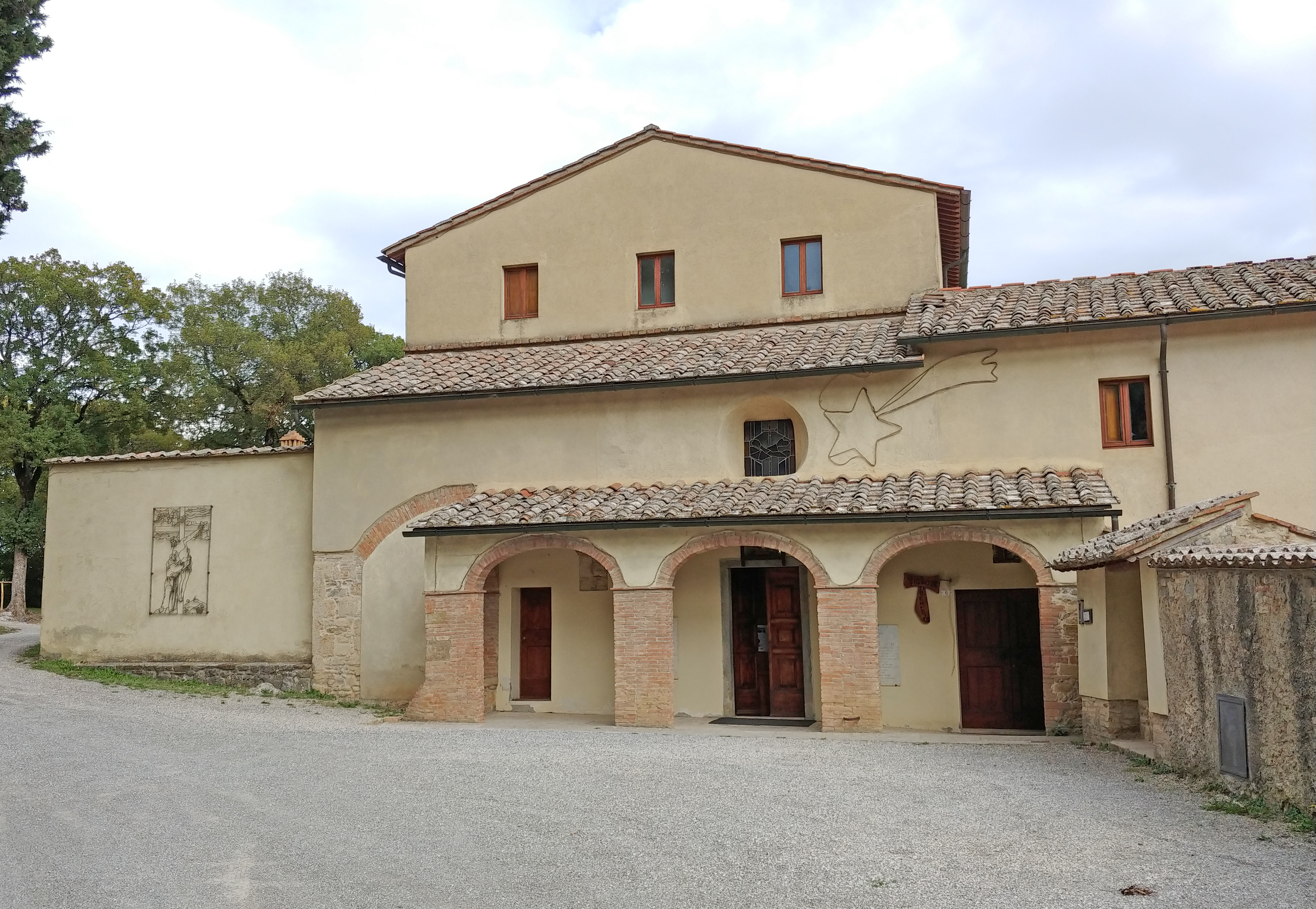
Santa Maddalena

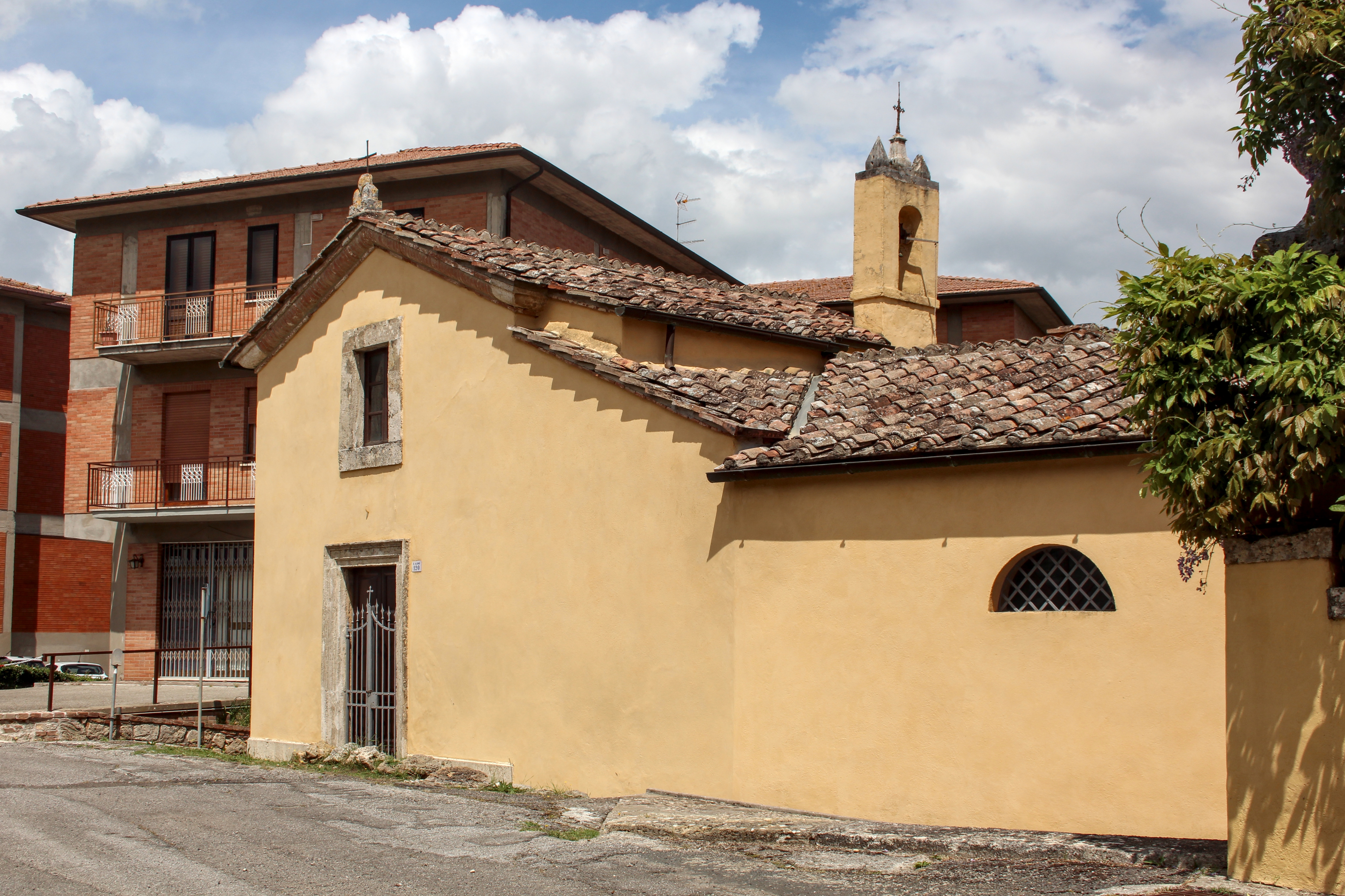
Chiesetta
