= Acquaviva, Montepulciano =

Acquaviva
- Frazione
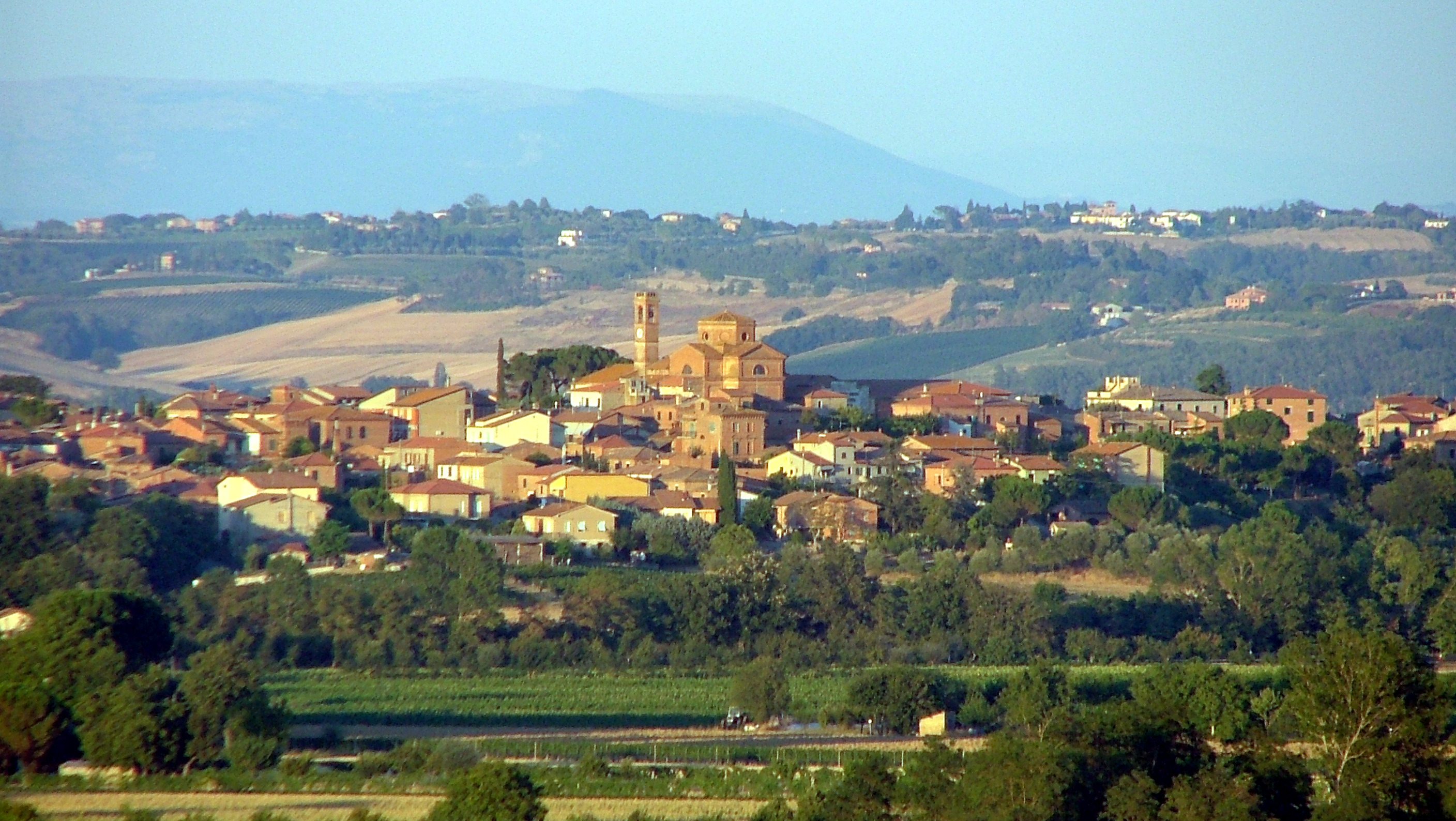
- View of Acquaviva

- Location of Acquaviva in Italy
- Coordinates: 43°6′50″N 11°51′49″E
- Country: Italy
- Region: Tuscany
- Province: Siena (SI)
- Comune: Montepulciano
- Elevation: 300 m (980 ft)

Population (2011)
  - Total: 1,330
- Demonym: Acquaviviani
- Time zone: UTC+1 (CET)
  - Summer (DST): UTC+2 (CEST)

Acquaviva is a village in Tuscany, central Italy, administratively a frazione of the comune of Montepulciano, province of Siena. At the time of the 2001 census its population was 1,350.

Acquaviva is about 67 km from Siena and 8 km from Montepulciano.
