= Montepulciano Stazione =

- Frazione
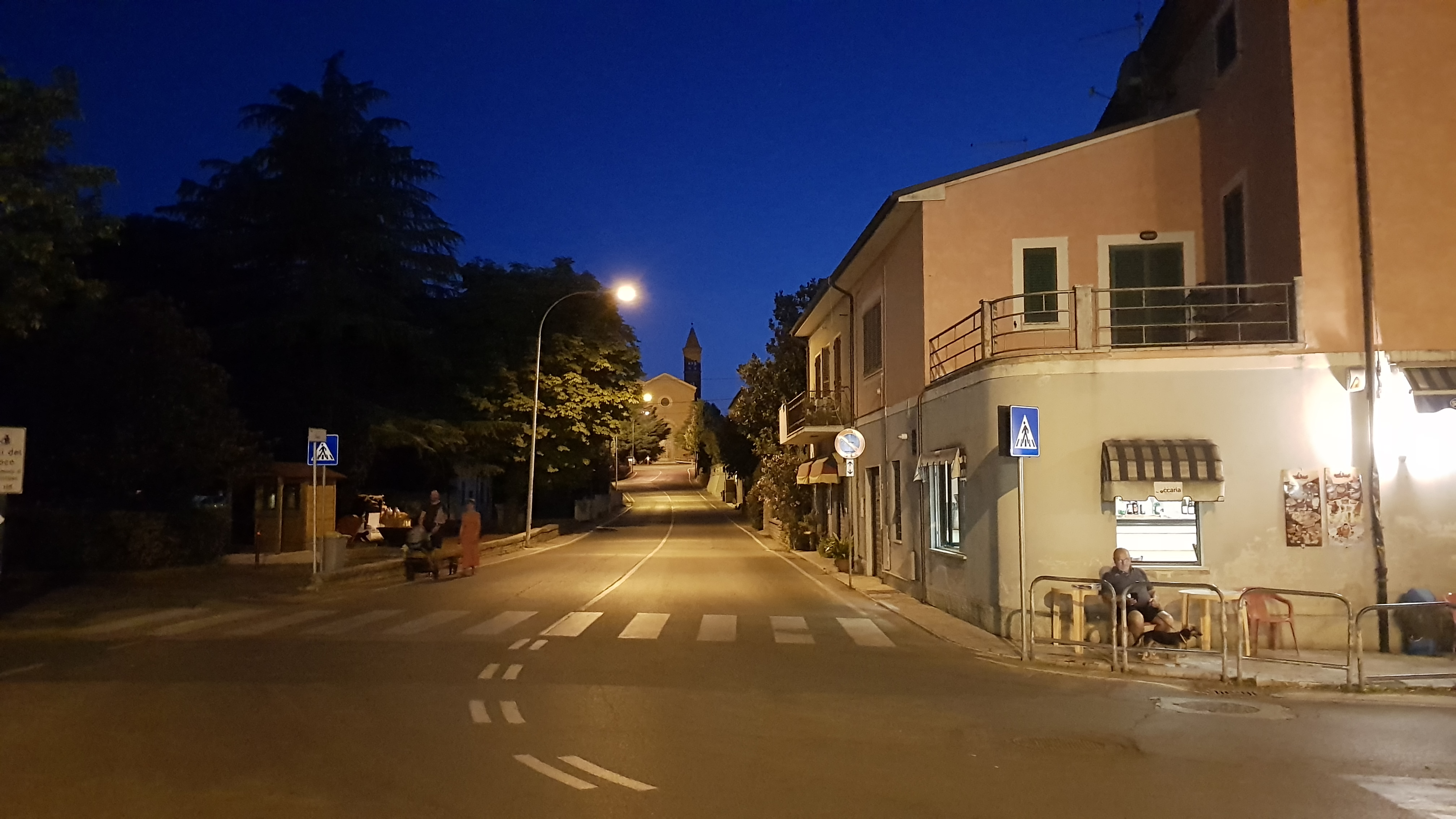

- Location of Montepulciano Stazione in Italy
- Coordinates: 43°8′12″N 11°51′19″E
- Country: Italy
- Region: Tuscany
- Province: Siena (SI)
- Comune: Montepulciano
- Elevation: 270 m (890 ft)

Population (2011)
  - Total: 1,572
- Time zone: UTC+1 (CET)
  - Summer (DST): UTC+2 (CEST)

Montepulciano Stazione is a town in Tuscany, central Italy, administratively a frazione of the comune of Montepulciano, province of Siena. At the time of the 2001 census its population was 1,507.

Montepulciano Stazione is about 66 km from Siena and 8 km from Montepulciano.
