= Montepulciano =

Town in Tuscany, Italy

- Comune
- Comune di Montepulciano
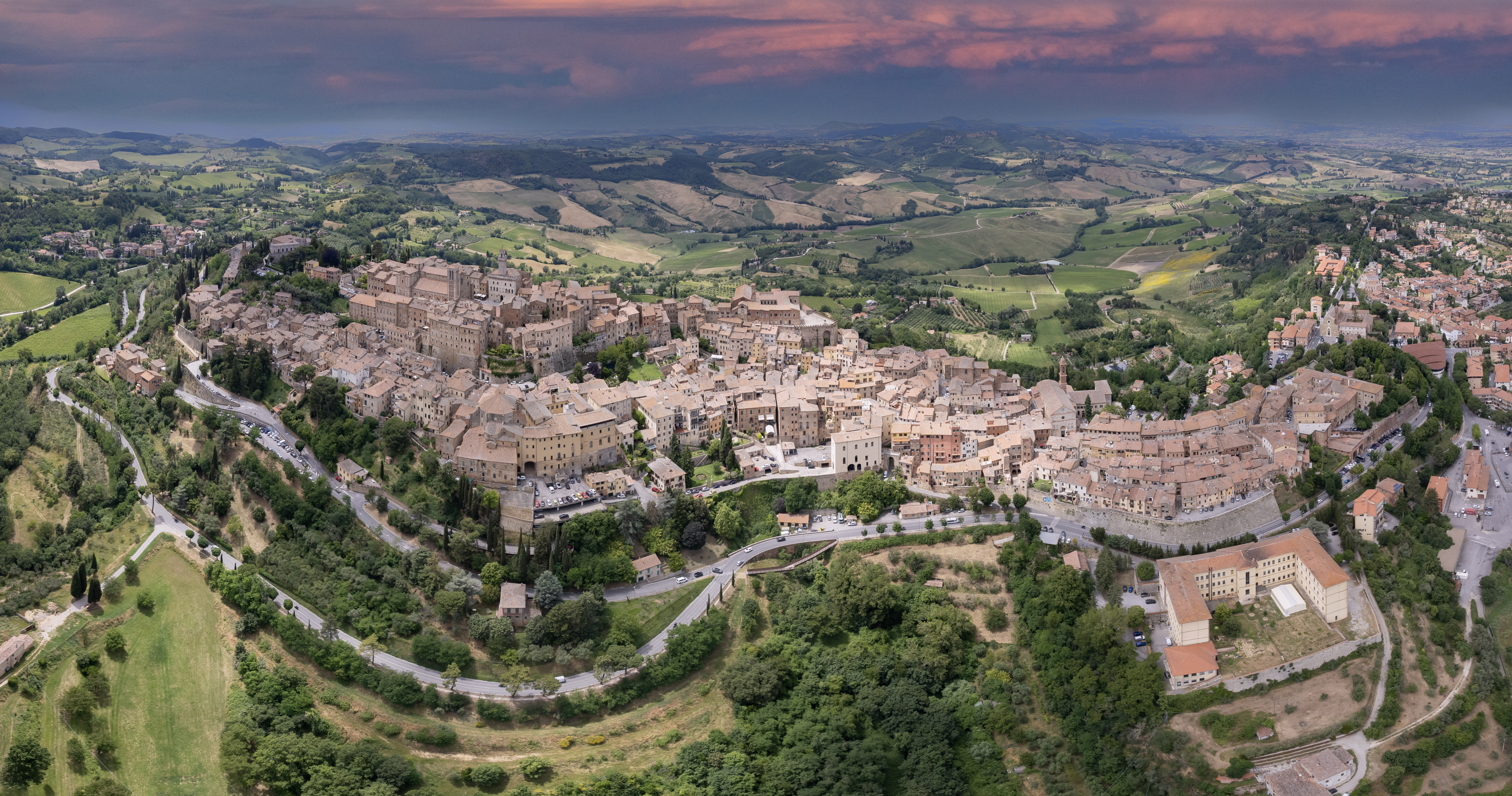
- Panorama of Montepulciano

- Coat of arms

- Location within Italy Location within Tuscany
- Coordinates: 43°06′N 11°47′E
- Country: Italy
- Region: Tuscany
- Province: Siena (SI)
- Frazioni: Abbadia, Acquaviva, Gracciano, Montepulciano Stazione, Sant'Albino, Valiano

Government
  - Mayor: Michele Angiolini (PD)

Area
  - Total: 165.33 km^{2} (63.83 sq mi)
- Elevation: 605 m (1,985 ft)

Population (31 December 2017)
  - Total: 13,984
  - Density: 84.582/km^{2} (219.07/sq mi)
- Demonym: Poliziani or Montepulcianesi
- Time zone: UTC+1 (CET)
  - Summer (DST): UTC+2 (CEST)
- Postal code: 53045
- Dialing code: 0578
- Patron saint: St. John the Baptist
- Saint day: 29 August
- Website: Official website

Montepulciano (Italian: [ˌmontepulˈtʃaːno]) is a medieval and Renaissance hill town and comune in the Italian province of Siena in southern Tuscany. It sits high on a 605-metre (1,985 ft) limestone ridge, 13 kilometres (8 mi) east of Pienza, 70 kilometres (43 mi) southeast of Siena, 124 kilometres (77 mi) southeast of Florence, and 186 kilometres (116 mi) north of Rome by car.

Montepulciano is a wine-producing region. The Vino Nobile di Montepulciano has Denominazione di origine controllata e garantita status and is, with the Brunello di Montalcino and Chianti Classico, one of the principal red wines of Tuscany. The Rosso di Montepulciano and Vin Santo di Montepulciano have Denominazione di origine controllata status.

== History ==
According to legend, it was founded by the Etruscan King Lars Porsena of Clusium (modern Chiusi). Recent findings prove that a settlement was in existence in the 4th-3rd centuries BC. In Roman times it was the seat of a garrison guarding the main roads of the area.

After the fall of the Western Roman Empire, it developed as a religious center under the Lombards. In the 12th century it was repeatedly attacked by the Republic of Siena, which the Poliziani faced with the help of the Perugia and Orvieto, and sometimes Florence, communes. The 14th century was characterized by constant struggles between the local noble families, until the Del Pecora family became rulers of the town. From 1390, Montepulciano was a loyal ally (and later possession) of Florence and, until the mid-16th century, lived a period of splendour with architects such as Antonio da Sangallo the Elder, Jacopo Barozzi da Vignola, Baldassarre Peruzzi, Ippolito Scalza and others, building luxurious residences and other edifices here. In 1559, when Siena was conquered by Florence and Montepulciano lost its strategic role, its importance declined.

After the unification of Italy and the drying of the Val di Chiana, the town remained the most important agricultural centre in the area, while the industrial activities moved mostly next to Chiusi, which was nearer to the railroad being built in that period.

A competitive "barrel race through the city" called the Bravio delle botti has been held on the last Sunday of August since the 14th Century.

== Main sights ==
Since the Second World War, tourism has been a significant aspect in the economy of the urban part of the commune. Many of the streets are designated as car-free. Most of the shops and restaurants are on the main street, which stretches from Porta Al Prato to Piazza Grande for 1.5 kilometres (0.9 mi).

The main landmarks include:

- Palazzo Comunale: city hall designed by Michelozzo recalling the Palazzo della Signoria (Palazzo Vecchio) of Florence.
- Palazzo Tarugi: Palace attributed to Antonio da Sangallo the Elder or Jacopo Barozzi da Vignola. It is entirely in travertine, with a portico which was once open to the public.
- Santa Maria Assunta Cathedral, or the Duomo of Montepulciano, constructed between 1594 and 1680, includes a masterpiece from the Sienese School, an enormous Assumption of the Virgin triptych painted by Taddeo di Bartolo in 1401.
- Santa Maria delle Grazie: (late 16th-century) church with a simple Mannerist façade with a three-arcade portico. The interior has a single nave, and houses a precious terracotta altar by Andrea della Robbia.
- Madonna di San Biagio Sanctuary: church, located on the road to Chianciano outside the city, it is a typical 16th century Tuscan edifice, designed by Antonio da Sangallo the Elder on a pre-existing Pieve, between 1518 and 1545. It has a circular (central) plan with a large dome over a terrace and a squared tambour. The exterior, with two bell towers, is built in white travertine.
- Santa Lucia: Baroque church with altarpiece by Luca Signorelli.
- Museo Civico di Montepulciano: located in the Palazzo Neri Orselli, displaying a collection of archeologic items, paintings, and terracotta works by the Della Robbia family.

== Notable people ==
- Robert Bellarmine: Roman Catholic Cardinal, Doctor of the Church, and saint was born 1542.
- Agnes of Montepulciano, Roman Catholic saint, was born in the neighbourhood of Montepulciano 1268.
- Angelo Poliziano: Florentine Renaissance classical scholar and poet born in Montepulciano on July 14, 1454.
- Giovanni Antonio Pandolfi Baroque composer and violinist born 1624.
- Baustelle: music band formed in 1994, the musicians origins in the town.
- Notable international actors, playwrights, and diplomats reside in the town.

== Municipal government ==
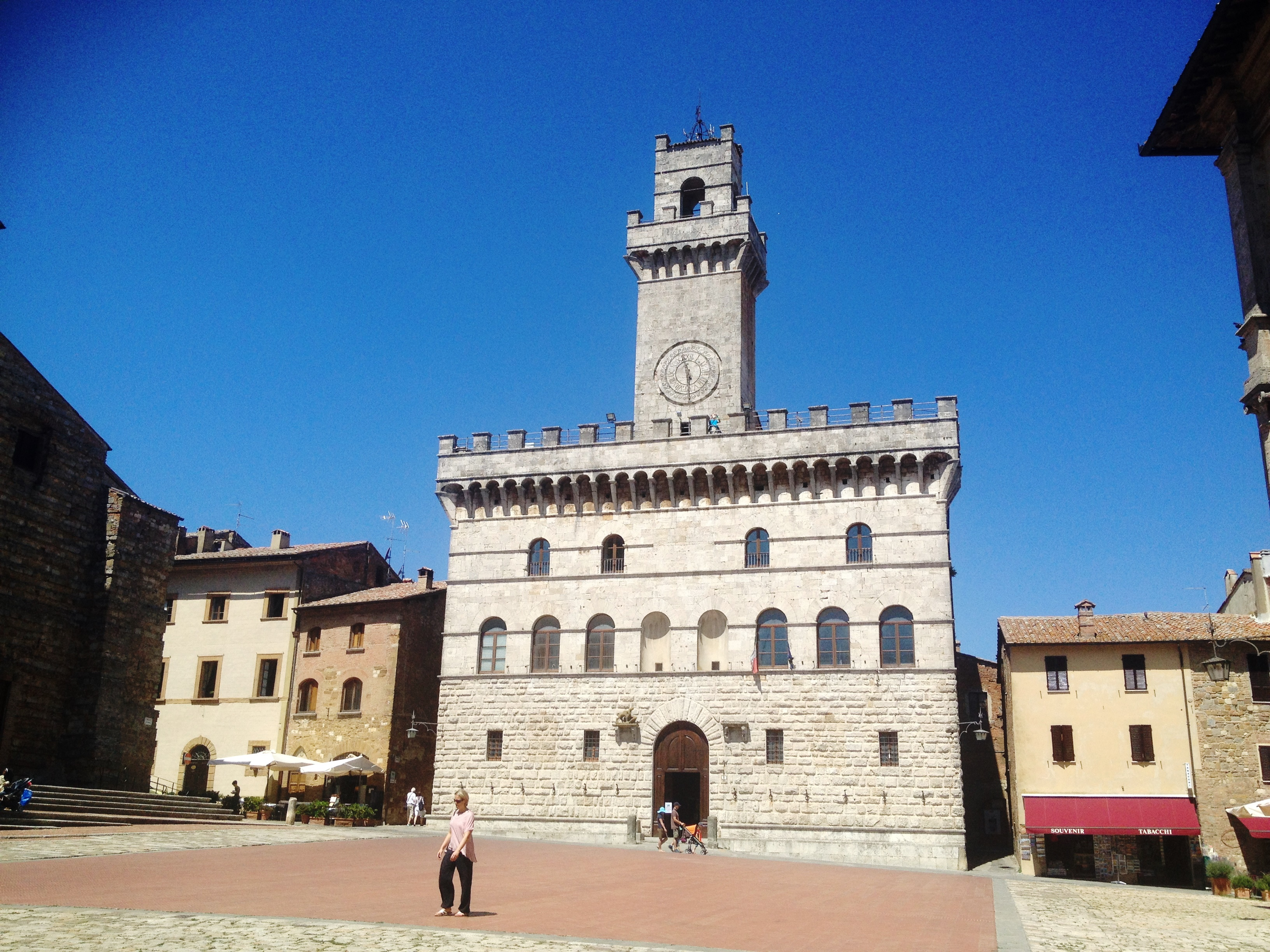
The Town Hall

Montepulciano is headed by a mayor (sindaco) assisted by a legislative body, the consiglio comunale, and an executive body, the giunta comunale. Since 1995 the mayor and members of the consiglio comunale are directly elected together by resident citizens, while from 1945 to 1995 the mayor was chosen by the legislative body. The giunta comunale is chaired by the mayor, who appoints others members, called assessori. The offices of the comune are housed in a building usually called the municipio or palazzo comunale.

Since 1995 the mayor of Montepulciano is directly elected by citizens, originally every four, then every five years. The current mayor is Michele Angiolini (PD), elected on 26 May 2019 with 56.2% of the votes and re-elected on 9 June 2024 with 53.3% of the votes.

Mayor	Term start	Term end	Party
Piero Di Betto	24 April 1995	14 June 2004	DS
Massimo Della Giovampaola	14 June 2004	8 June 2009	PD
Andrea Rossi	8 June 2009	27 May 2019	PD
Michele Angiolini	27 May 2019	incumbent	PD

== Twin towns—sister cities ==
Montepulciano is twinned with:

- Moulins, France

== Gallery ==
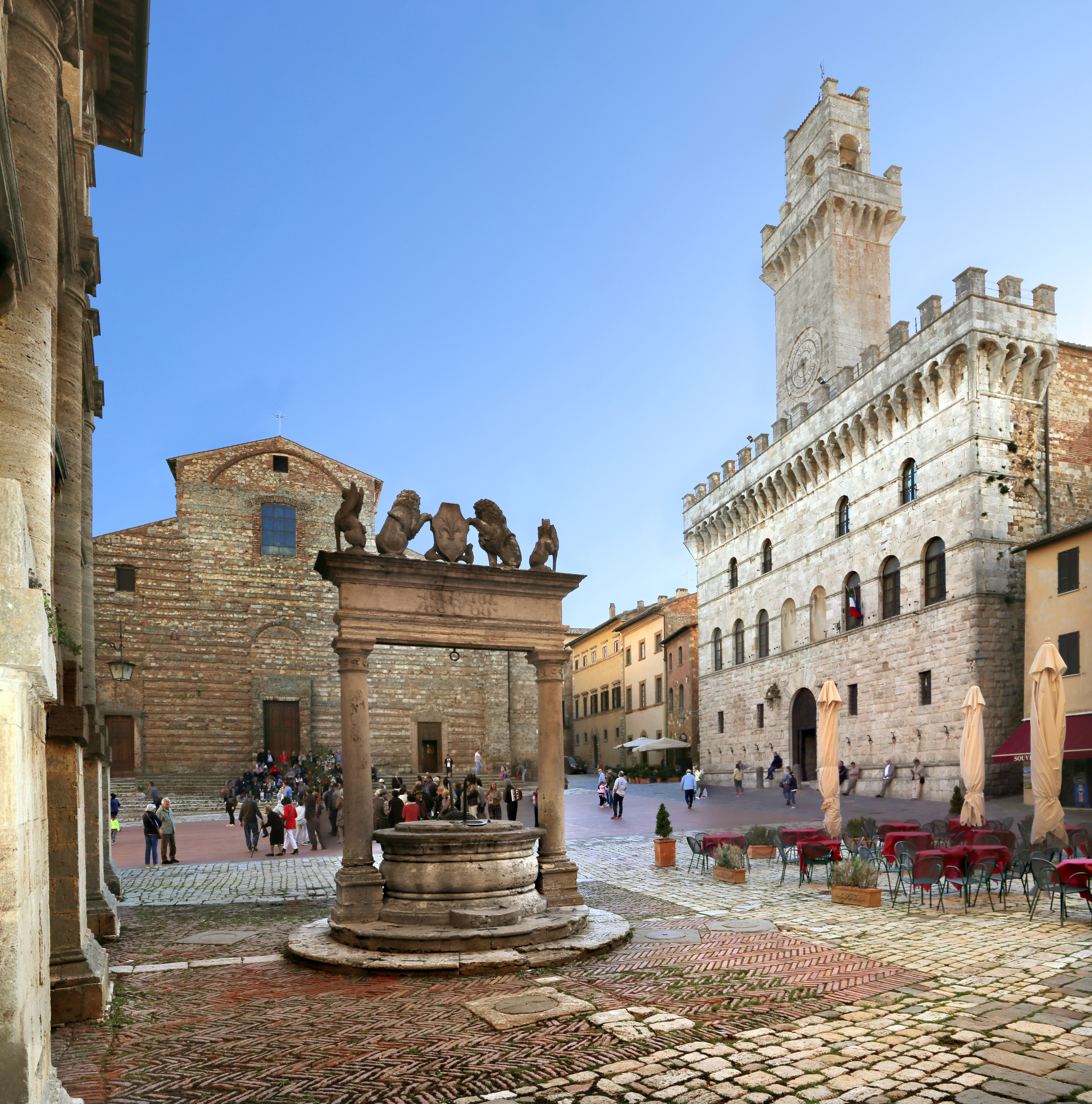
Piazza Grande

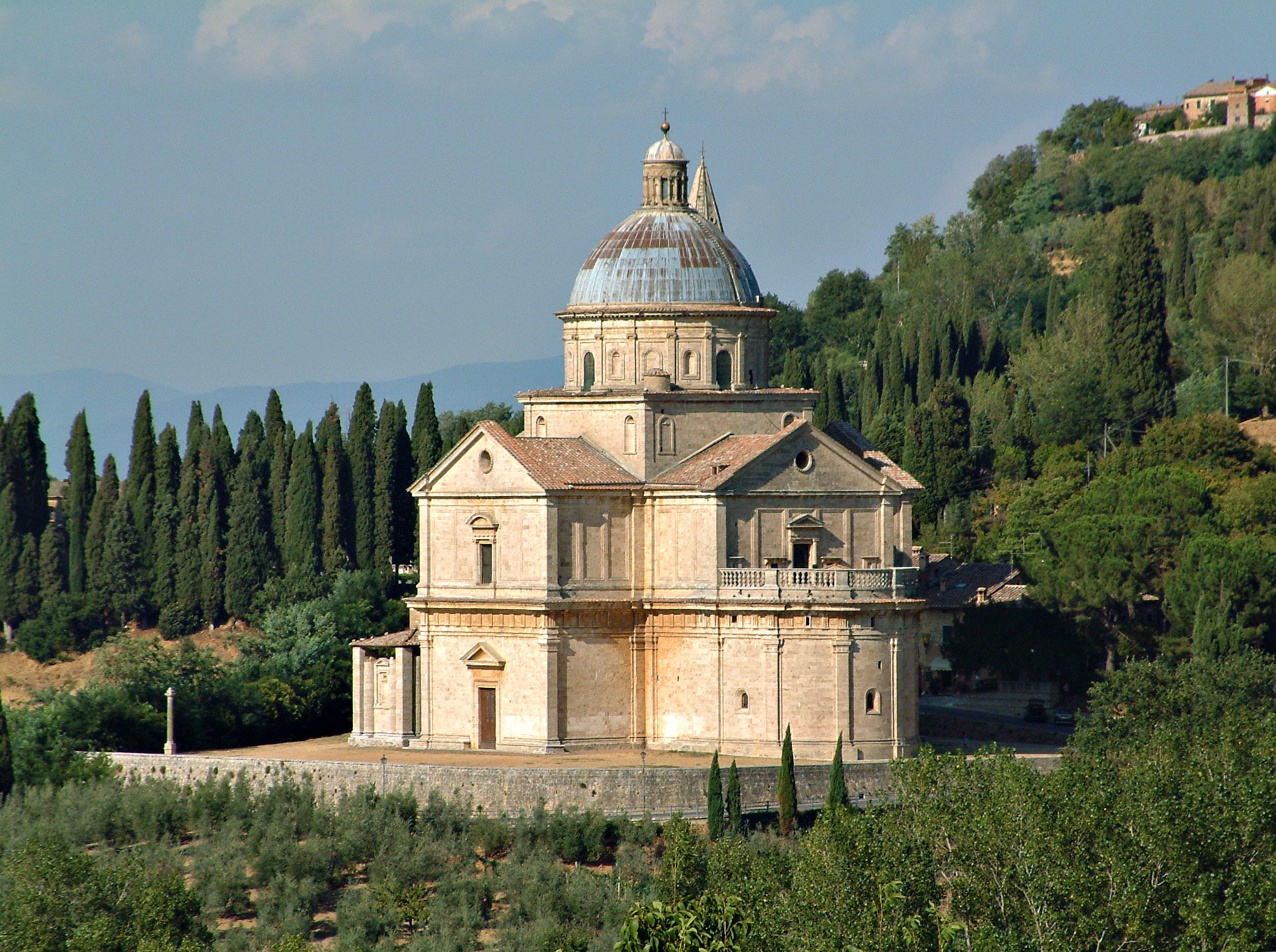
Madonna di San Biagio Sanctuary

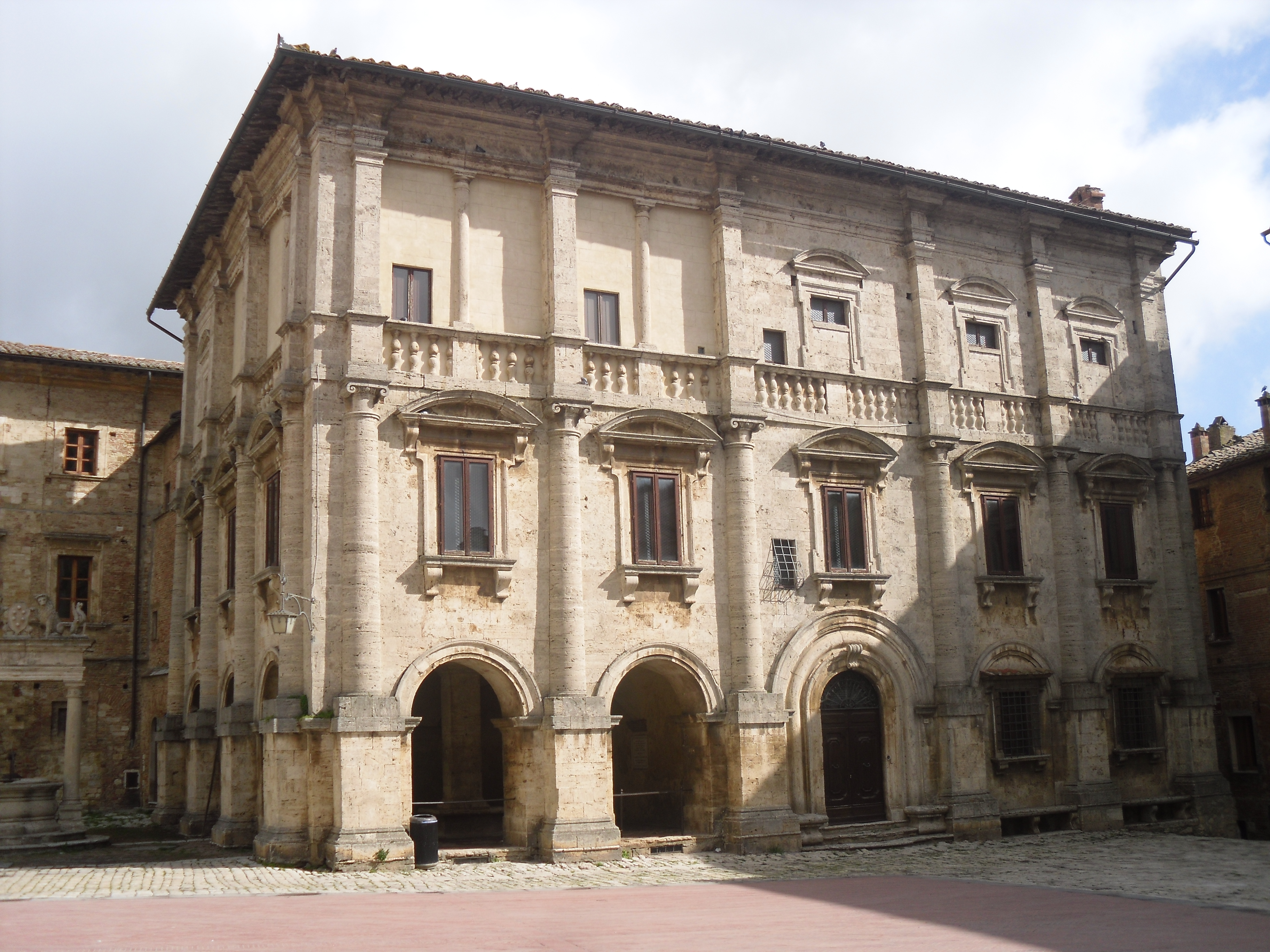
Palazzo Tarugi

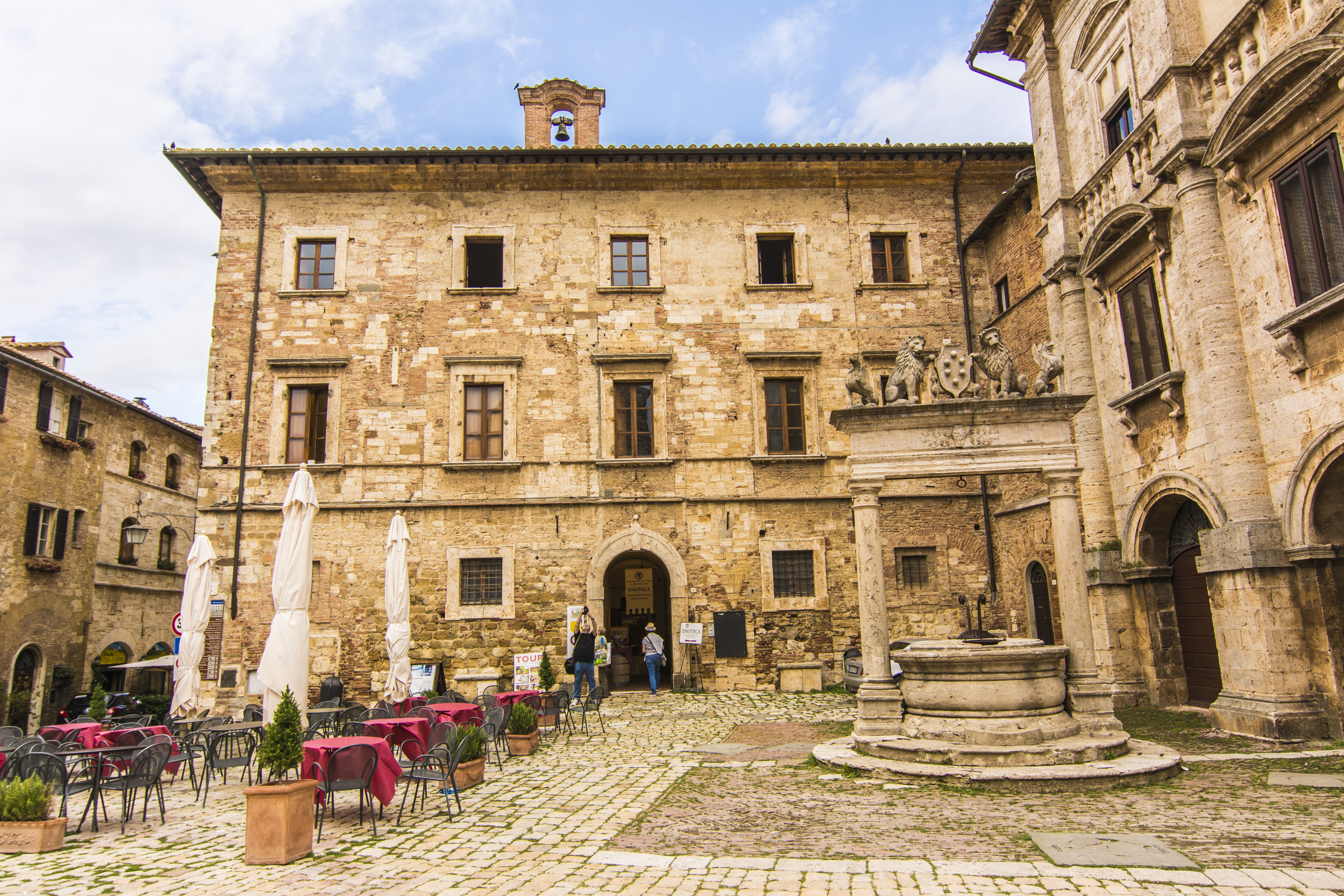
Palazzo del Capitano

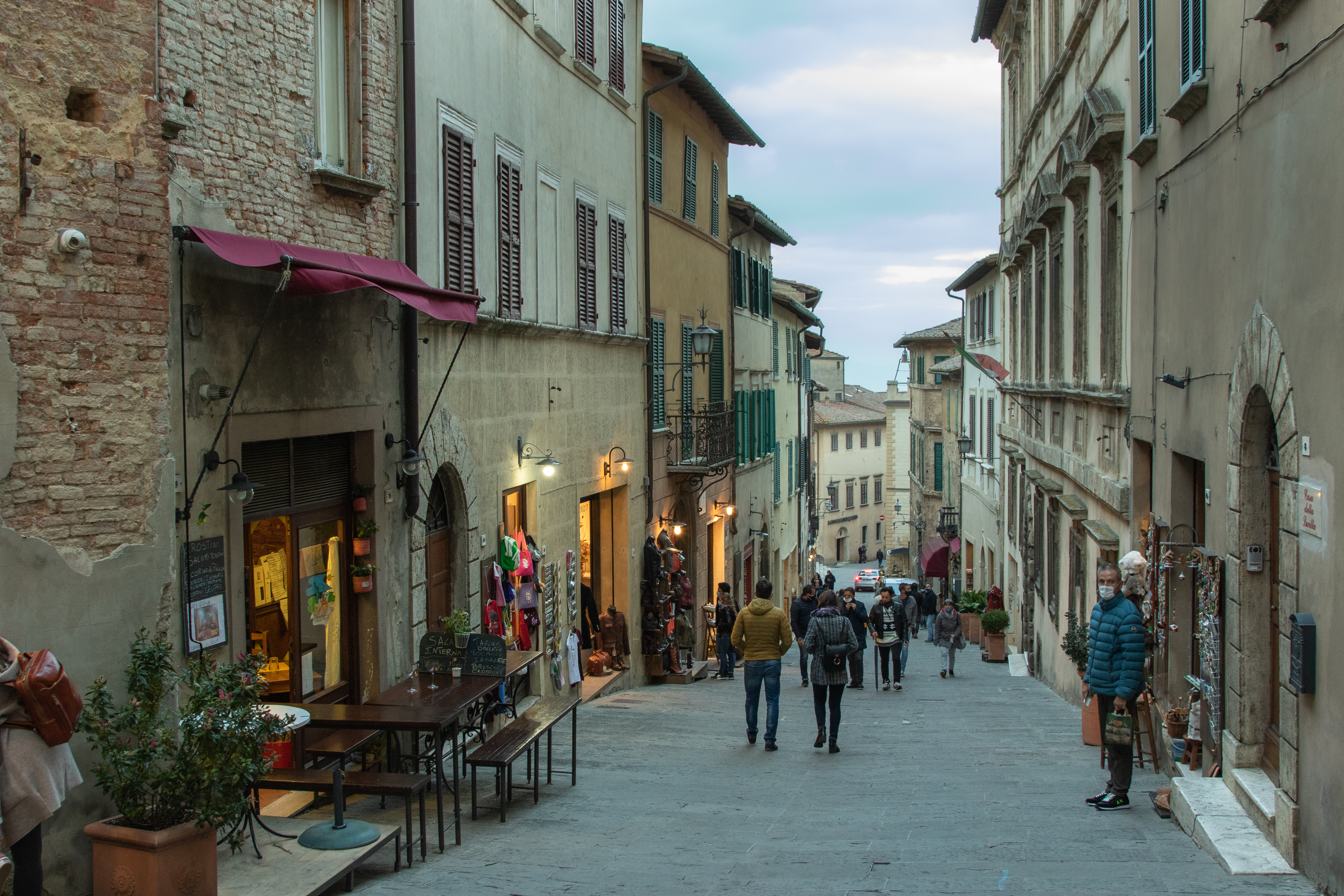
Street in the city center

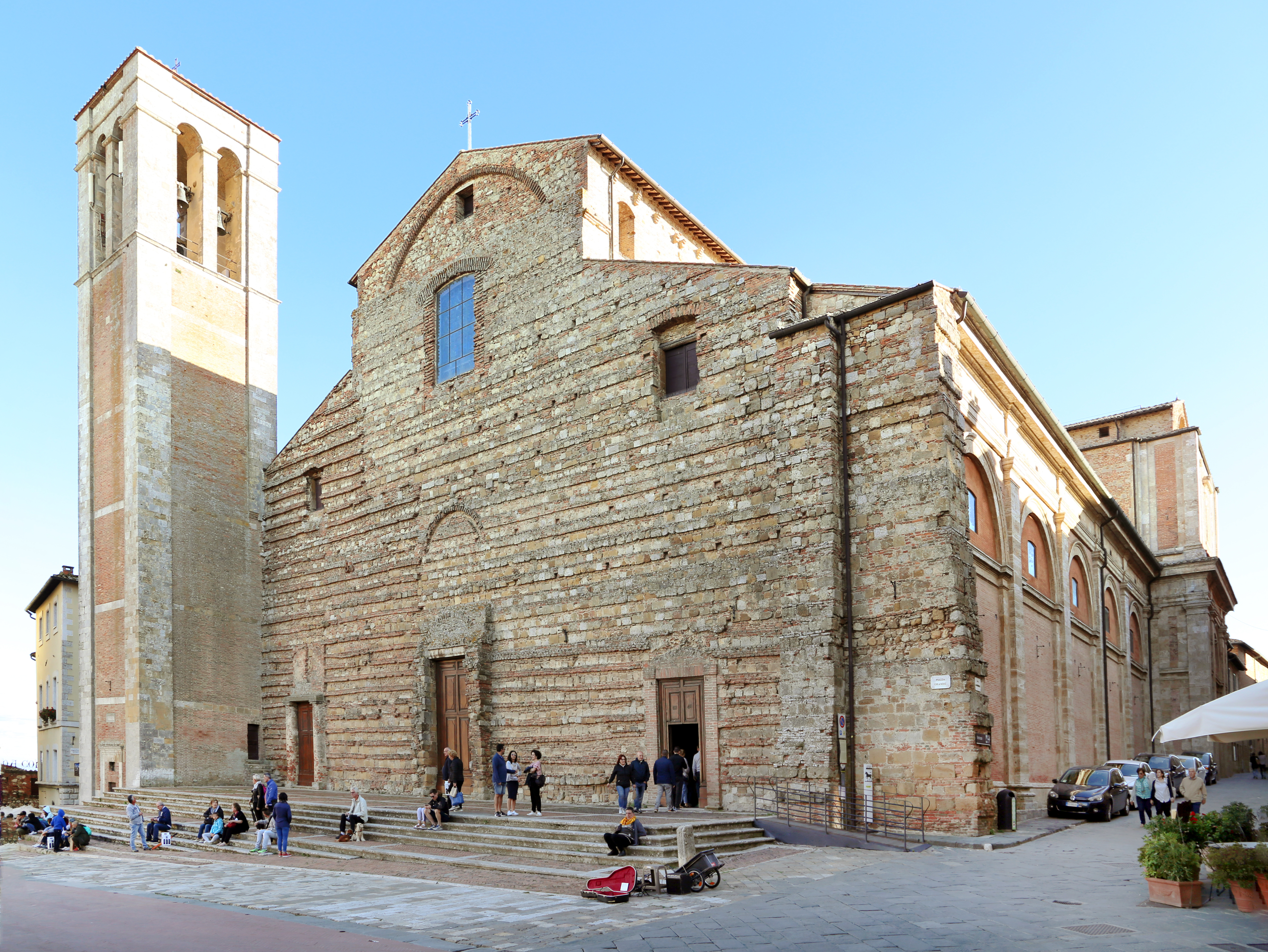
The Cathedral

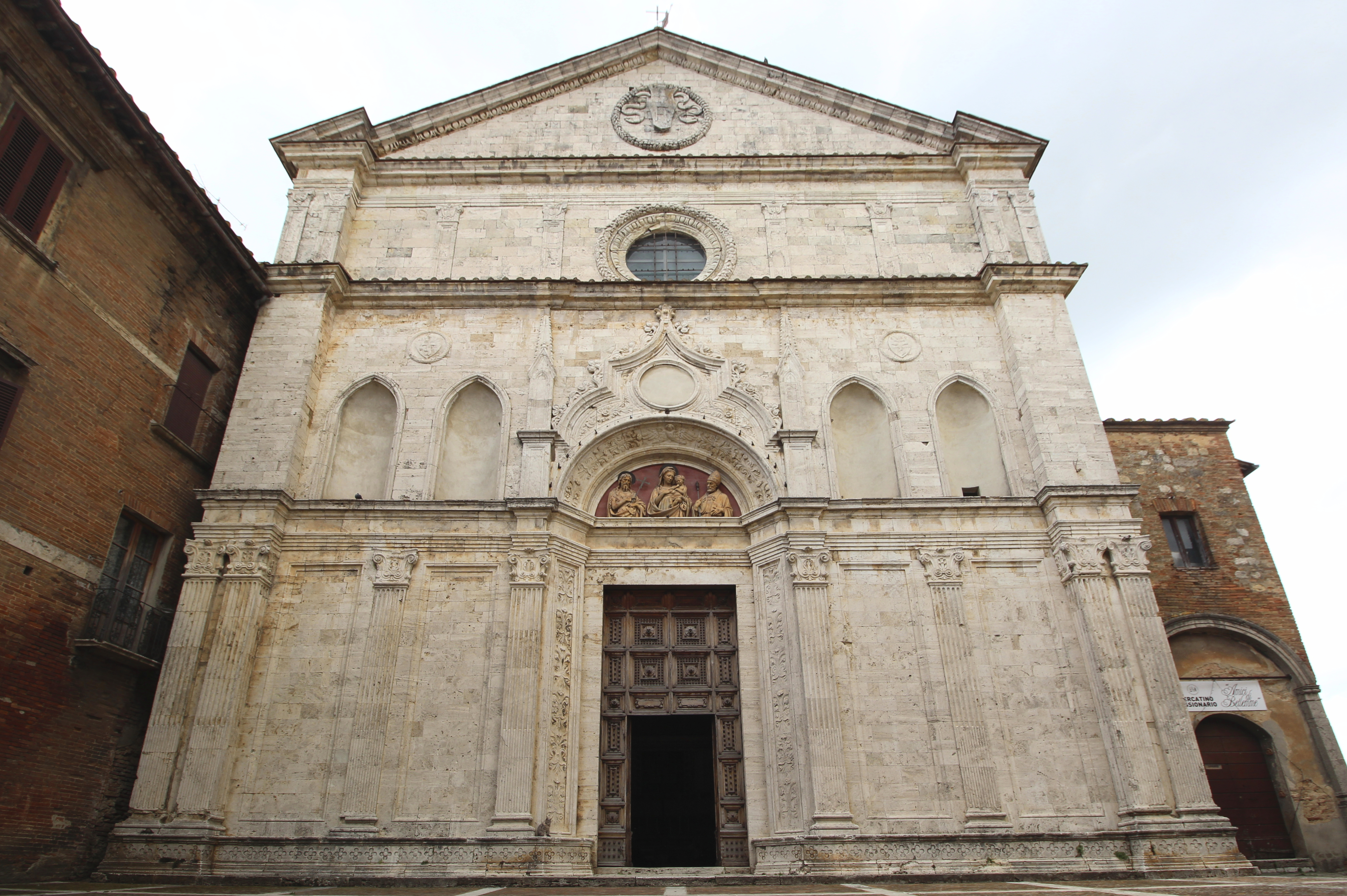
Sant'Agostino church

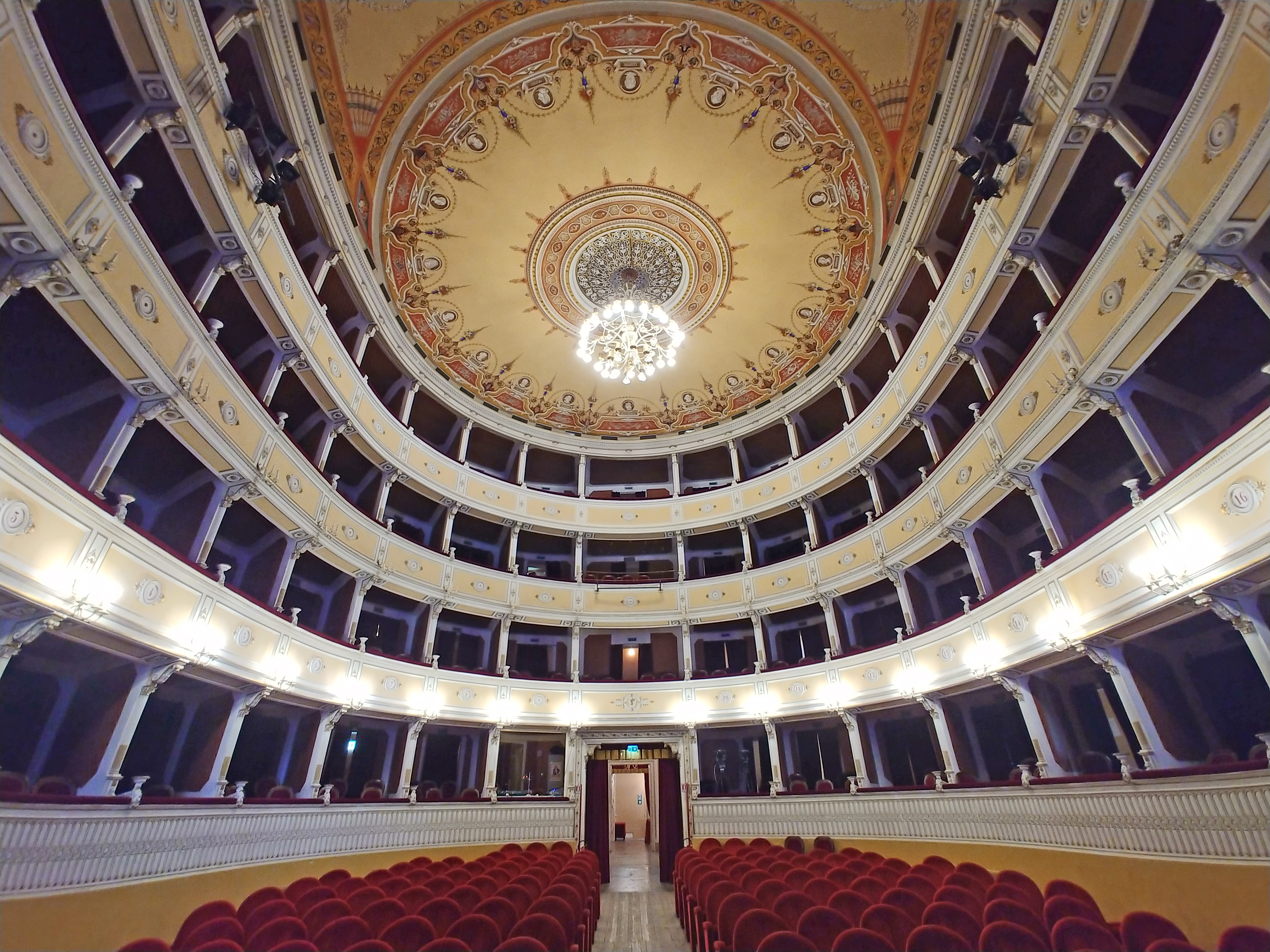
Poliziano Theatre

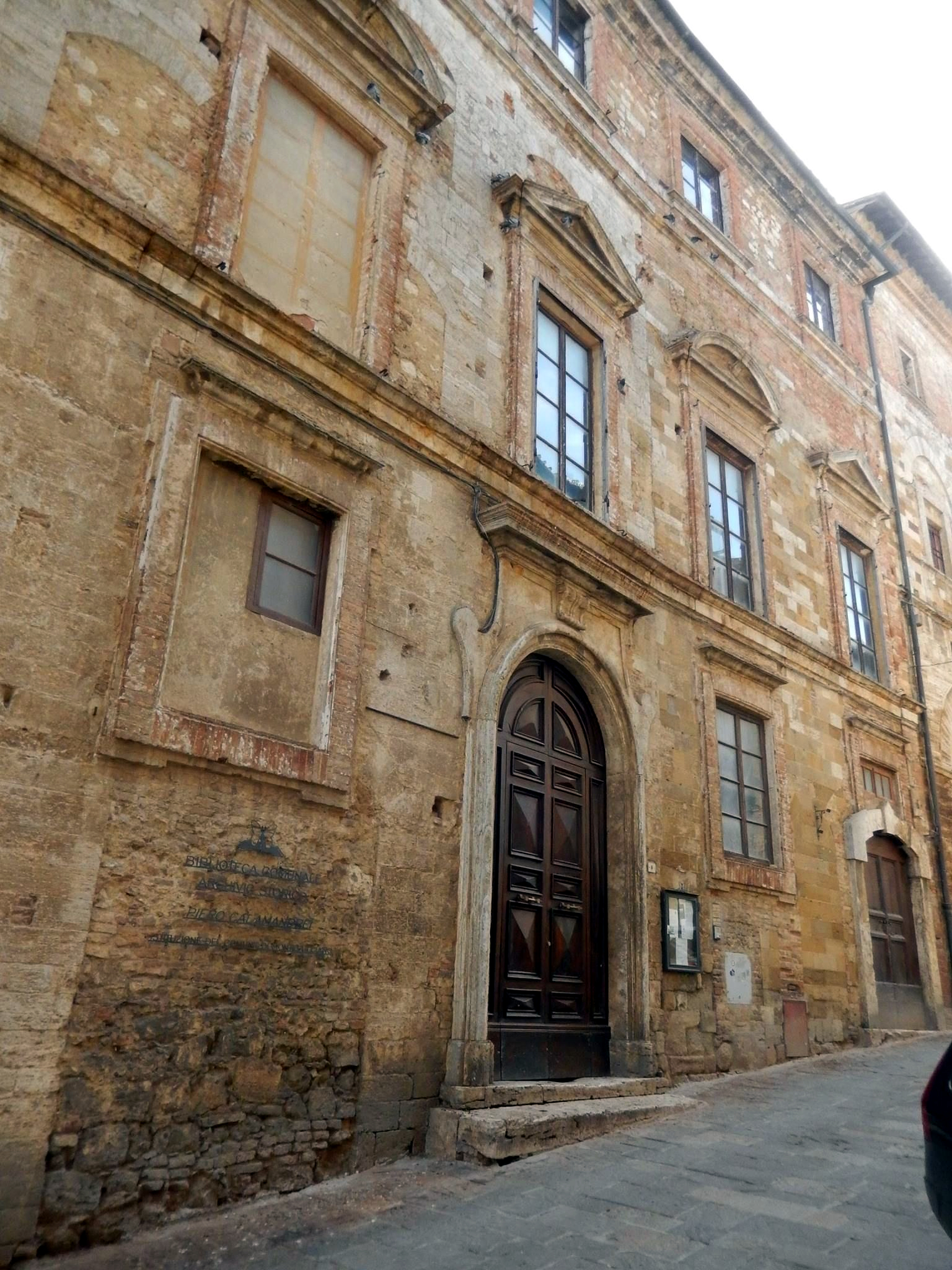
Public library

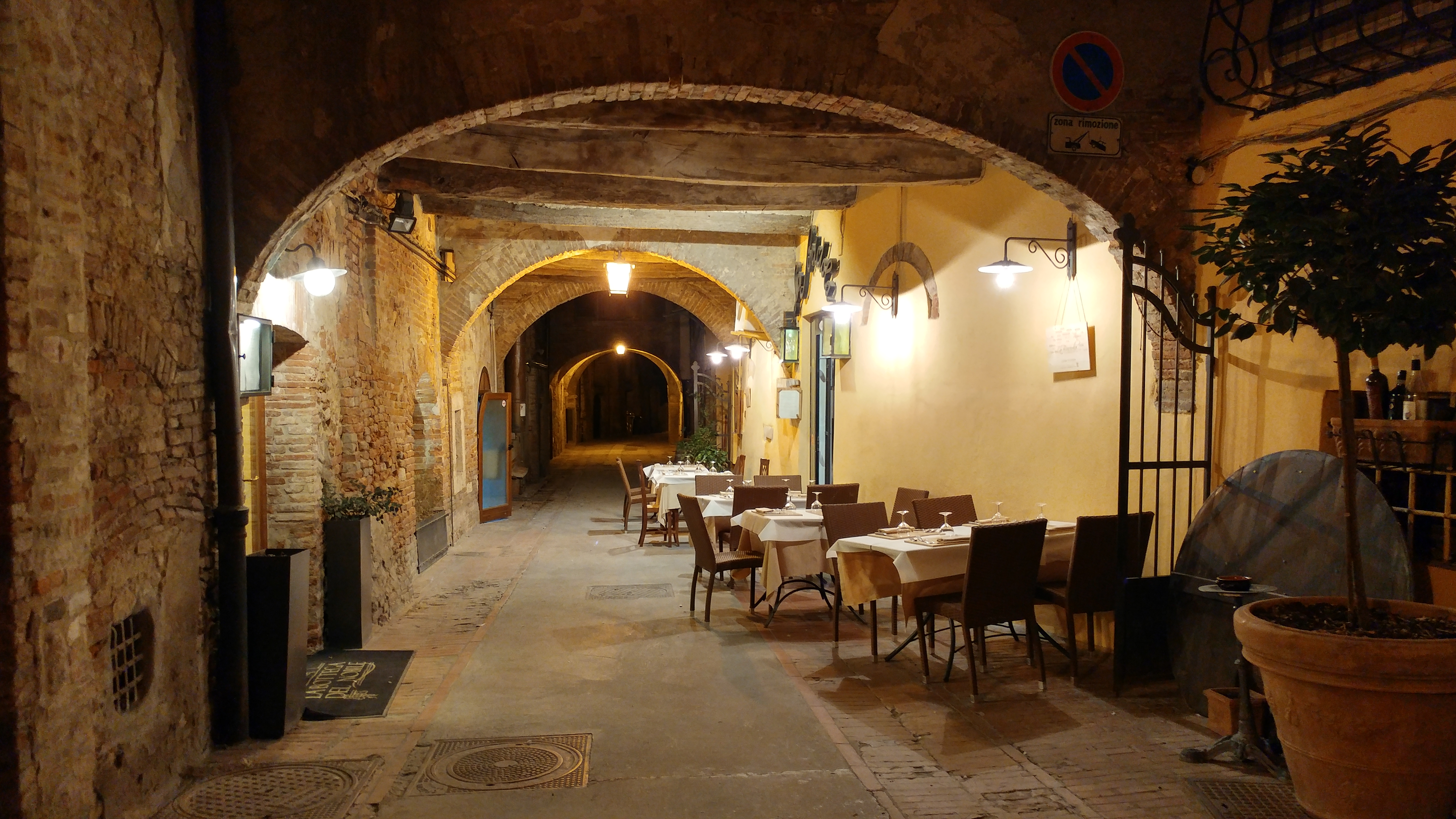
Restaurant in the city center

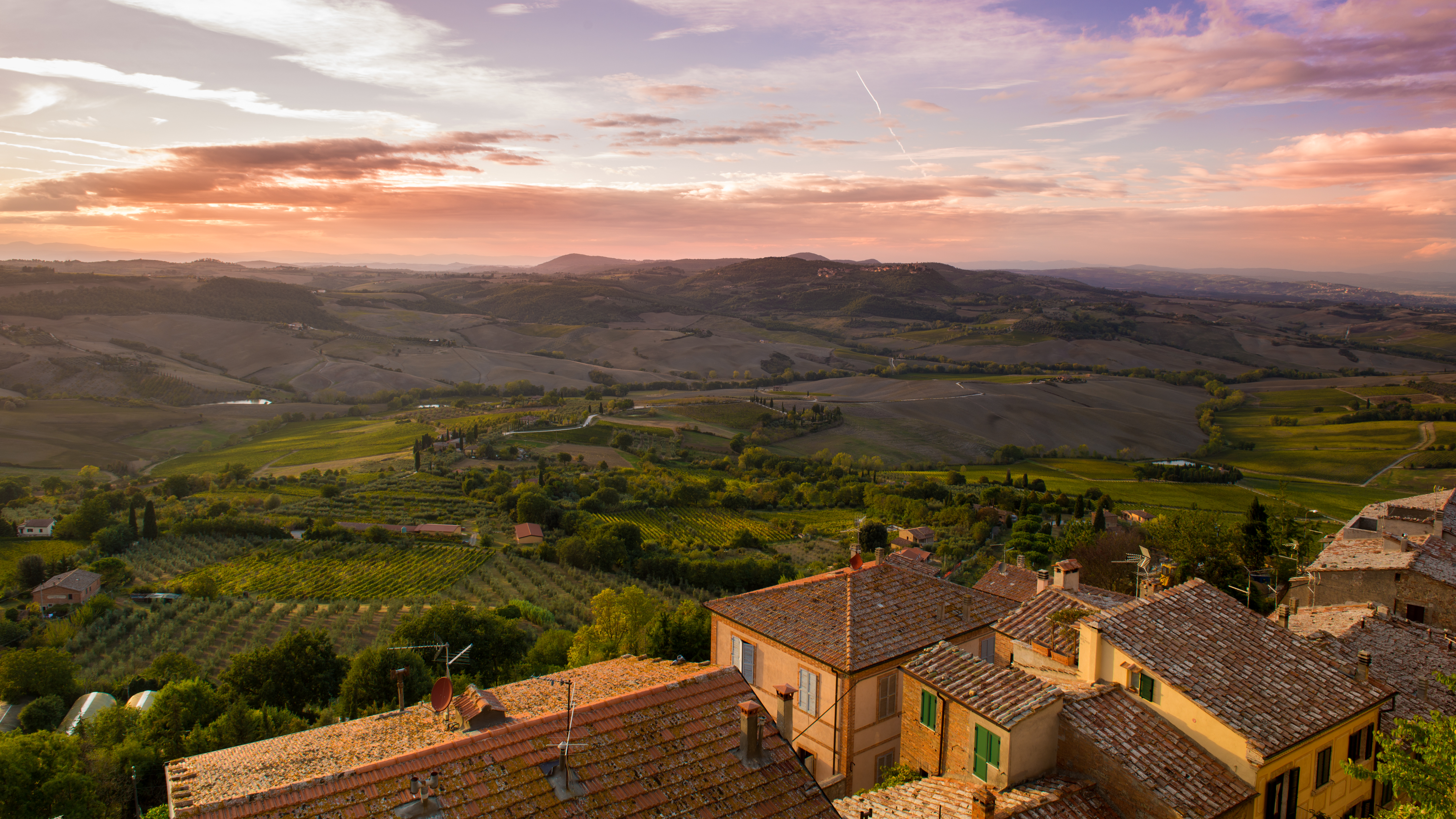
View from the town

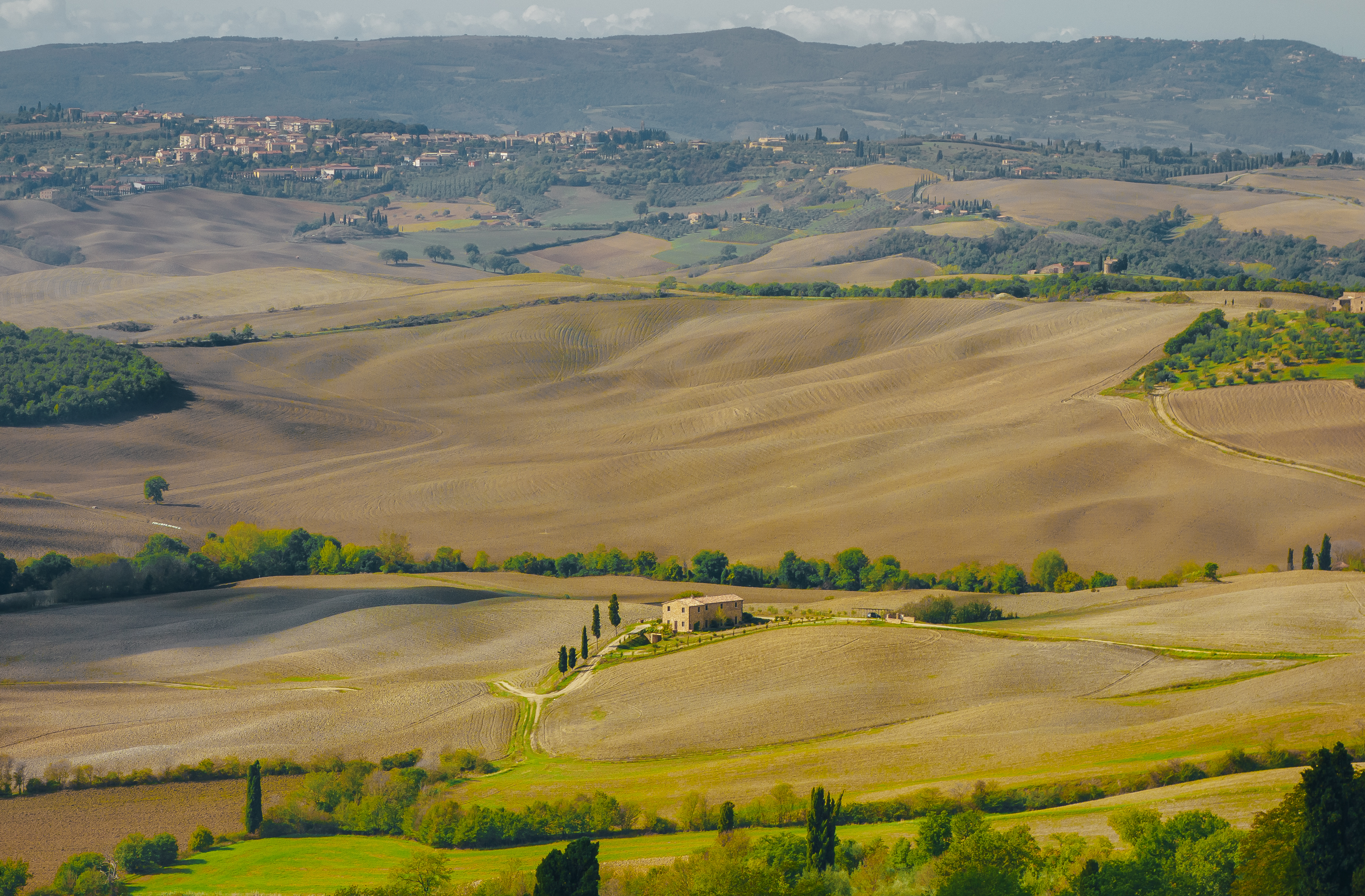
Countryside around Montepulciano

== See also ==
- Bruscello
