= Abbadia, Montepulciano =

Abbadia
- Frazione
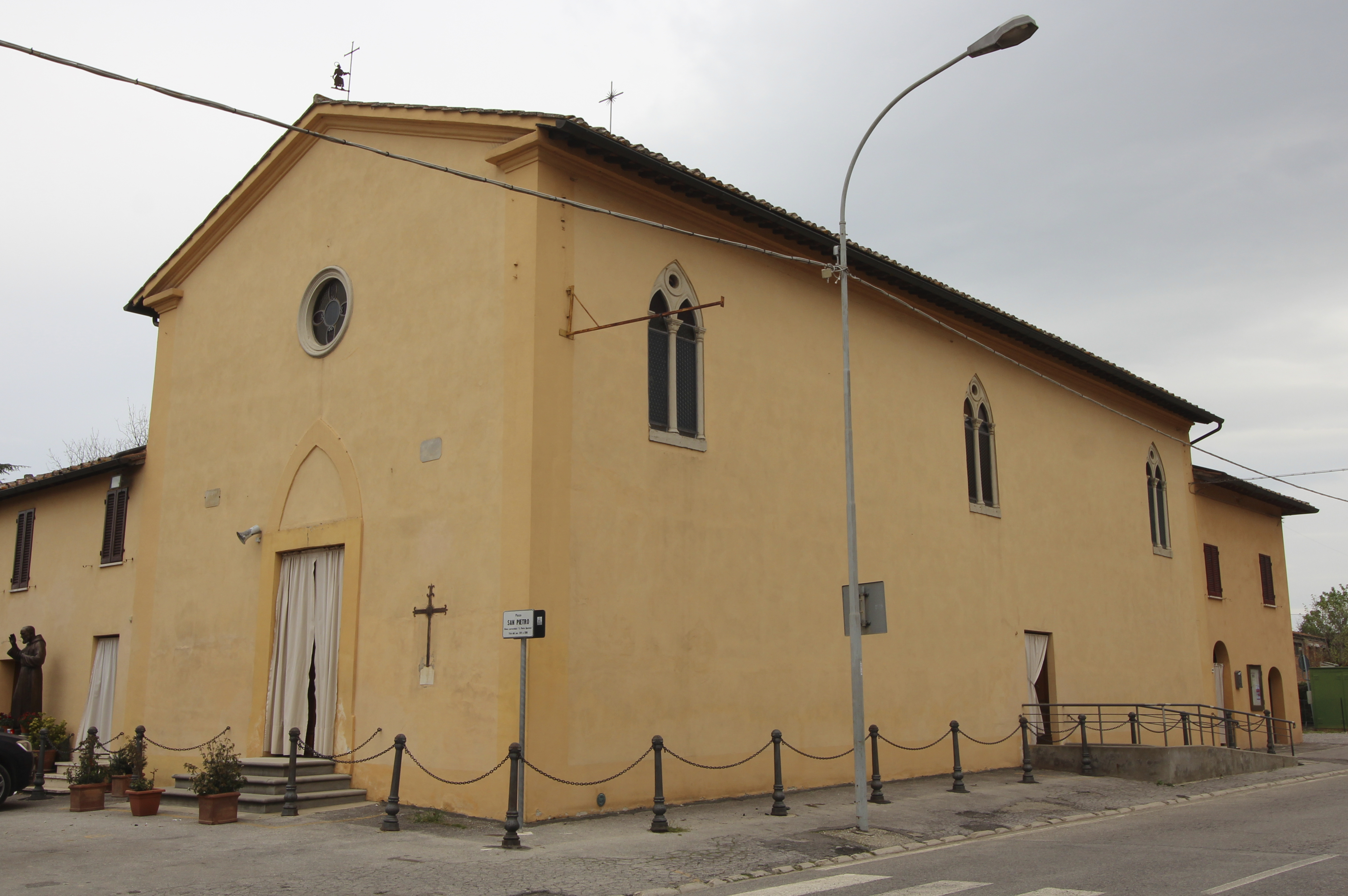
- The church of San Pietro in Abbadia

- Location of Abbadia in Italy
- Coordinates: 43°8′43″N 11°49′20″E
- Country: Italy
- Region: Tuscany
- Province: Siena (SI)
- Comune: Montepulciano
- Elevation: 282 m (925 ft)

Population (2011)
  - Total: 2,001
- Demonym: Abbadiani
- Time zone: UTC+1 (CET)
  - Summer (DST): UTC+2 (CEST)

Abbadia is a village in Tuscany, central Italy, administratively a frazione of the comune of Montepulciano, province of Siena. At the time of the 2001 census its population was 1,055.

Abbadia is about 58 km from Siena and 7 km from Montepulciano.
